= 2016 Varsity Cup =

- Countries: South Africa
- Date: 8 February – 11 April 2016
- Champions: NWU Pukke (1st title)
- Runners-up: Maties
- Relegated: None
- Matches played: 31
- Tries scored: 204 (average 6.6 per match)
- Top point scorer: Divan Nel (84)
- Top try scorer: Duhan van der Merwe (10)

The 2016 Varsity Cup was contested from 8 February to 11 April 2016. The tournament (also known as the FNB Varsity Cup presented by Steinhoff International for sponsorship reasons) was the ninth season of the Varsity Cup, an annual inter-university rugby union competition featuring eight South African universities.

The tournament was won by NWU Pukke, who beat Maties 7–6 in the final played on 11 April 2016. No team was automatically relegated to the second-tier Varsity Shield competition for 2017 and bottom side UCT Ikey Tigers beat UWC in a relegation play-off to remain in the competition for 2017.

Following a disruption during the Round Three match between UFS Shimlas and NMMU Madibaz and general unrest on various university campuses, all fixtures scheduled for 29 February were postponed to 4 April, with the semi-finals and final also postponed by a week. On 1 March, it was also announced that the round of matches scheduled for 7 March would also be postponed, with the situation at various universities being monitored to determine when the competition would resume. After a meeting by the executive management of Varsity Rugby on 9 March, it was decided that all remaining matches in the competition would be played at neutral venues and that matches should resume on 14 March.

== Competition rules and information ==
There were eight participating universities in the 2016 Varsity Cup. These teams played each other once over the course of the season, either home or away.

Teams received four points for a win and two points for a draw. Bonus points were awarded to teams that scored four or more tries in a game, as well as to teams that lost a match by seven points or less. Teams were ranked by log points, then points difference (points scored less points conceded).

The top four teams qualified for the title play-offs. In the semi-finals, the team that finished first had home advantage against the team that finished fourth, while the team that finished second had home advantage against the team that finished third. The winners of these semi-finals played each other in the final, at the home venue of the higher-placed team.

The bottom team in the Varsity Cup qualified for a relegation play-off against the runner-up of the Varsity Shield at the end of the season.

The Varsity Cup introduced a new scoring system for 2016, where tries could be worth five, seven or nine points, depending on the point where the try-scoring move originated. If the try-scoring move originated in the opponents' 22, it would count five points. If the try-scoring move originated between the halfway line and the opponents' 22, two bonus points were awarded for a seven-point try. If the try originated in the try-scoring team's own half, four bonus points were awarded and the try would be worth nine points. In another change from previous seasons, the points for kicks reverted to the common scoring system used in rugby union – conversions were worth two points, while penalties and drop goals were worth three points.

While the 2014 and 2015 editions of the Varsity Cup saw all matches officiated by two referees, this reverted to just one official for 2016.

The Varsity Cup also retained the White Card system introduced in 2015, but only for the semi-finals and the final. Under this system, either team's coach or captain could refer incidents for further review, similar to the Umpire Decision Review System used in cricket. They could have incidents reviewed that they believed were either given incorrectly or went unnoticed by the on-field referees. Each team was entitled to one review in each half of the match; if a review proved successful, the team retained their white card review for that half, but if it was unsuccessful, they lost the right to further reviews for the remainder of the half.

There were two further changes introduced for the 2016 season. Firstly, if a maul did not move forwards for a period of five seconds, the referee would give the team in possession a further three seconds to use the ball and failure to do so resulted in turnover of possession. Secondly, the traditional "crouch, bind, set" scrum call was changed to "crouch, bind, slide", with the slide call ensuring no impact between the front rows.

There were also some changes to the quota system: the number of players of colour that had to be included in a matchday 23 was increased from six to seven, with three of those in the starting line-up. Teams were allowed to field four first-year students under the age of 22, of which three have to be players of colour. Three additional first-year students could be fielded with no racial quotas, provided they were in Grade 12 at high school in 2015.

== Teams ==
Location of teams in the 2016 Varsity Cup

The following teams took part in the 2016 Varsity Cup competition:

2016 Varsity Cup teams
Team name	University	Stadium
CUT Ixias	Central University of Technology	CUT Stadium, Bloemfontein
Maties	Stellenbosch University	Danie Craven Stadium, Stellenbosch
NMMU Madibaz	Nelson Mandela Metropolitan University	NMMU Stadium, Port Elizabeth
NWU Pukke	North-West University	Fanie du Toit Sport Ground, Potchefstroom
UCT Ikey Tigers	University of Cape Town	UCT Rugby Fields, Cape Town
UFS Shimlas	University of the Free State	Shimla Park, Bloemfontein
UJ	University of Johannesburg	UJ Stadium, Johannesburg
UP Tuks	University of Pretoria	LC de Villiers Stadium, Pretoria

== Standings ==
The final standings for the 2016 Varsity Cup were: (Note: According to the match report on the South African Rugby Union website, the final score of the UCT Ikey Tigers v NWU Pukke match was 24–6. However, according to the Varsity Cup website, it was 22–6. The weekly match round-up on SARU's website also reports a final score of 22–6, so this final scoreline was assumed.)

2016 Varsity Cup standings
Pos	Team	P	W	D	L	PF	PA	PD	TF	TA	TB	LB	Pts
1	Maties	7	6	0	1	263	122	+141	33	14	5	0	29
2	UJ	7	6	0	1	254	151	+103	26	17	3	0	27
3	NWU Pukke	7	5	0	2	230	166	+64	27	18	5	1	26
4	UP Tuks	7	4	0	3	333	195	+138	38	23	5	1	22
5	UFS Shimlas	7	4	0	3	210	235	−25	26	26	3	0	19
6	CUT Ixias (Note: On 22 March 2016, the Varsity Cup Executive Committee announced that CUT Ixias had two points deducted for fielding an ineligible player in their Round One match against Maties.)	7	2	0	5	93	211	−118	11	26	1	1	8
7	NMMU Madibaz	7	1	0	6	169	251	−82	21	30	1	2	7
8	UCT Ikey Tigers	7	0	0	7	103	324	−221	11	39	1	2	3

Legend and competition rules
Legend:
Top four teams; qualified to the semi-finals.	P = Games played, W = Games won, D = Games drawn, L = Games lost, PF = Points for, PA = Points against, PD = Points difference, TF = Tries for, TA = Tries against, TB = Try bonus points, LB = Losing bonus points, Pts = Log points
Qualify to the relegation play-offs.	P = Games played, W = Games won, D = Games drawn, L = Games lost, PF = Points for, PA = Points against, PD = Points difference, TF = Tries for, TA = Tries against, TB = Try bonus points, LB = Losing bonus points, Pts = Log points
Competition rules:
Play-offs: The top four teams qualified to the semi-finals. The first-placed team hosted the fourth-placed team and the second-placed team hosted the third-placed team. The higher-ranked semi-final winner then hosted the lower-ranked semi-final winner in the final. The bottom side qualified for the relegation play-offs. Points breakdown: * 4 points for a win * 2 points for a draw * 1 bonus point for a loss by seven points or less * 1 bonus point for scoring four or more tries in a match

=== Round-by-round ===
The table below shows each team's progression throughout the season. For each round, their cumulative points total is shown with the overall log position in brackets:

Team Progression – 2016 Varsity Cup
Team	R1	R2	R3	R4	R5	R6	R7	Semi	Final
Maties	5 (1st)	10 (1st)	14 (1st)	19 (1st)	24 (1st)	29 (1st)	29 (1st)	Won	Lost
UJ	4 (3rd)	8 (3rd)	12 (3rd)	12 (4th)	17 (3rd)	22 (2nd)	27 (2nd)	Lost	—N/a
NWU Pukke	5 (2nd)	7 (4th)	11 (4th)	16 (3rd)	16 (4th)	21 (3rd)	26 (3rd)	Won	Won
UP Tuks	0 (7th)	2 (8th)	2 (8th)	7 (5th)	12 (5th)	17 (5th)	22 (4th)	Lost	—N/a
UFS Shimlas	4 (4th)	9 (2nd)	14 (2nd)	18 (2nd)	19 (2nd)	19 (4th)	19 (5th)	—N/a	—N/a
CUT Ixias	0 (8th)	4 (5th)	4 (5th)	5 (6th)	3 (8th)	3 (7th)	8 (6th)	—N/a	—N/a
NMMU Madibaz	1 (6th)	2 (7th)	2 (7th)	2 (7th)	7 (6th)	7 (7th)	7 (7th)	—N/a	—N/a
UCT Ikey Tigers	1 (5th)	2 (6th)	2 (6th)	2 (8th)	3 (7th)	3 (8th)	3 (8th)	—N/a	—N/a
Key:	win	draw	loss						

== Pool stages ==
The following matches were played in the 2016 Varsity Cup: (Note: In addition to the five points for a try, an additional two or four bonus points may also awarded for each individual try, depending on where the try-scoring move originated. These are indicated by (2BP) or (4BP) after the minute of the try.)

=== Round one ===
8 February 2016	UP Tuks	15–38	NWU Pukke	LC de Villiers Stadium, Pretoria
16:45	Try: Andrew Beerwinkel 45'; Duhan van der Merwe 59'; Con: Joshua Stander 46' (1/2); Pen: Joshua Stander 15' (1/1)	Report; Scoreboard; Video	Try: Walt Steenkamp 7'; Benhard Janse van Rensburg 9' (4BP), 21'; Sylvian Mahuza 72'; Con: Rhyno Smith 8', 10', 22', 73' (4/4); Pen: Rhyno Smith 42', 55' (2/2)	Referee: Stephan Geldenhuys

8 February 2016	Maties	40–0	CUT Ixias	Danie Craven Stadium, Stellenbosch
18:30	Try: Beyers de Villiers 2'; Kobus van Dyk 20', 26'; Ernst Stapelberg 29'; Craig Corbett 51'; Edwill van der Merwe 76' (2BP); Con: Ernst Stapelberg 2', 20', 29', 76' (4/6)	Report; Scoreboard; Video		Referee: Francois Pretorius

8 February 2016	UJ	19–12	NMMU Madibaz	UJ Stadium, Johannesburg
18:30	Try: Jeremy Jordaan 68'; Con: Divan Nel 69' (1/1); Pen: Divan Nel 12', 28', 46', 58' (4/4); Kobus Engelbrecht (0/1)	Report; Scoreboard; Video	Try: Jayson Reinecke 61' (2BP); Con: Simon Bolze 61' (1/1); Pen: Simon Bolze 33' (1/2)	Referee: Rodney Boneparte

8 February 2016	UCT Ikey Tigers	17–23	UFS Shimlas	UCT Rugby Fields, Cape Town
19:00	Try: Khanyo Ngcukana 45'; Nate Nel 74' (2BP); Con: Robert Anderson (0/1); Hilio de Abreu 75' (1/1); Pen: Hilio de Abreu 81' (1/1); Cards: Joel Carew (yellow card) 39' to 50'	Report; Scoreboard; Video	Try: Arthur Williams 7'; Nardus Erasmus 69' (2BP); Mosolwa Mafuma 72' (2BP); Con: Stephan Janse van Rensburg 8', 73' (2/3); Cards: Teunis Nieuwoudt (yellow card) 42' to 53'	Referee: Cwengile Jadezweni

=== Round two ===
15 February 2016	NMMU Madibaz	25–27	Maties	NMMU Stadium, Port Elizabeth
16:45	Try: Kevin Kaba 61' (2BP); Yamkela Ngam 70' (2BP); Marzuq Maarman 76'; Con: Tom Kean (0/3); Pen: Simon Bolze 17', 28' (2/3)	Report; Scoreboard; Video	Try: Paul Streicher 32'; Beyers de Villiers 40'; Craig Corbett 46'; Brendon Nell 81'; Con: Ernst Stapelberg 40', 82' (2/4); Pen: Ernst Stapelberg 66' (1/1); Cards: Beyers de Villiers (yellow card) 70' to 79'; Ian Groenewald (yellow card) 74'	Referee: Sindile Ngcese

15 February 2016	CUT Ixias	10–9	UCT Ikey Tigers	CUT Stadium, Bloemfontein
18:30	Try: Clinton Toua 43'; Con: Darren Baron 44' (1/1); Pen: Darren Baron 27' (1/4); Cards: Marius Grobler (yellow card) 8' to 28'	Report; Scoreboard	Try: Rico Lategan 15' (2BP); Con: Robert Anderson 26' (1/1); Cards: Michael Kumbirai (yellow card) 42' to 53'	Referee: Jaco Kotze

15 February 2016	UP Tuks	46–47	UFS Shimlas	LC de Villiers Stadium, Pretoria
18:30	Try: Neethling Fouché 4' penalty try 21' (2BP); Duhan van der Merwe 24' (4BP); Riaan Britz 38' (4BP); Ruan Steenkamp 43'; Con: Joshua Stander 21', 25', 39', 44' (4/5); Pen: Joshua Stander 61' (1/1)	Report; Scoreboard	Try: Teunis Nieuwoudt 27'; Pieter-Steyn de Wet 34' (Note: The SARU match report lists the name of the 34th minute try-scorer as Mosolwa Mafuma, while the Varsity Cup match report lists it as Pieter-Steyn de Wet in the report and scoreboard sections. The latter was assumed to be correct.); Mosolwa Mafuma 47' (2BP); Nicolaas Immelman 57'; Conraad van Vuuren 66' (4BP); Marco Klopper 72'; Con: Stephan Janse van Rensburg 28' (1/2); Marco Mason 58', 67', 73' (3/4); Pen: Stephan Janse van Rensburg 4' (1/1); Cards: Marco Mason (yellow card) 21'	Referee: AJ Jacobs

15 February 2016	NWU Pukke	31–36	UJ	Fanie du Toit Sport Ground, Potchefstroom
19:00	Try: Lucian Cupido 2'; Jeandré Rudolph 24'; Sylvian Mahuza 42' (4BP); Wilmar Arnoldi 61'; Con: Rhyno Smith 3', 43' (2/4) (Note: According to the SARU match report, Rhyno Smith missed a conversion in the 34th minute. However, no try was scored prior to that. It's assumed to be a missed penalty instead.); Pen: Rhyno Smith 69' (1/2); Drop: Rhyno Smith (0/1); Cards: Jeandré Rudolph (yellow card) 48' to 59'	Report; Scoreboard; Video	Try: Aphiwe Dyantyi 14' (4BP), 53' (2BP) penalty try 49'; Con: Divan Nel 15', 50', 54' (3/3); Pen: Divan Nel 8', 31', 72' (3/4); Drop: Divan Nel (0/1); Cards: Wian Conradie (yellow card) 18' to 29'; Ronald Brown (yellow card) 22' to 34'	Referee: Lourens van der Merwe

=== Round three ===
22 February 2016	UJ	14–0	CUT Ixias	UJ Stadium, Johannesburg
16:45	Try: Emmanuel Morowane 29'; PJ Walters 35'; Con: Divan Nel 30', 36' (2/2); Cards: Etienne Oosthuizen (yellow card) 47'	Report; Scoreboard; Video	Pen: Henry Immelman (0/2)	Referee: Ben Crouse

22 February 2016	UCT Ikey Tigers	6–22	NWU Pukke	UCT Rugby Fields, Cape Town
18:30	Pen: Robert Anderson 39', 46' (2/2)	Report; Scoreboard	Try: Wilmar Arnoldi 14'; Bart le Roux 33'; Walt Steenkamp 71'; Con: Rhyno Smith 15', 34' (2/3); Pen: Rhyno Smith 7' (1/1); Cards: Jeandré Rudolph (yellow card) 77'	Referee: Francois Pretorius

22 February 2016	UFS Shimlas	46–19	NMMU Madibaz	Shimla Park, Bloemfontein
18:30	Try: Stephan Janse van Rensburg 2' (2BP); Marco Mason 8'; Mosolwa Mafuma 45' (2BP); Renier Botha 56'; Arthur Williams 65' (2BP); Chase Morison 74' (2BP); Con: Pieter-Steyn de Wet (0/2); Marco Mason 46', 57', 66', 75' (4/4); Cards: Nicolaas Immelman (yellow card) 49' to 60'	Report; Scoreboard	Try: Ivan-John du Preez 5' (2BP); Ivan Ludick 60'; Keanu Vers 72'; Con: Tom Kean (0/1); Simon Bolze 61' (1/2); Cards: Kevin Kaba (yellow card) 64' to 75'	Referee: Stephan Geldenhuys

22 February 2016	Maties	29–16	UP Tuks	Danie Craven Stadium, Stellenbosch
19:00	Try: Duncan Saal 15' (4BP), 31' (4BP), 72' (2BP); Con: Ernst Stapelberg 32', 73' (2/3)	Report; Scoreboard; Video	Try: Keanan van Wyk 10' (4BP); Corniel Els 44'; Con: Joshua Stander 45' (1/2)	Referee: Rodney Boneparte

=== Round four ===
14 March 2016	UFS Shimlas	10–9	CUT Ixias	FNB Stadium, Johannesburg
13:00	Try: Mosolwa Mafuma 24'; Con: Marco Mason 25' (1/1); Pen: Marco Mason 79' (1/1); Cards: Chase Morison (red card) 61'	Report; Scoreboard	Pen: Meyer van Tonder 12', 36', 76' (3/6)	Referee: Jaco Kotze

14 March 2016	NMMU Madibaz	18–46	NWU Pukke	FNB Stadium, Johannesburg
15:00	Try: Brandon Brown 30'; Warren Swarts 66' (4BP); Con: Simon Bolze 31' (1/1); Tom Kean 67' (1/1)	Report; Scoreboard	Try: Sylvian Mahuza 4' (4BP), 73'; Jaco Jordaan 8' (2BP) penalty try 22'; Benhard Janse van Rensburg 45' (4BP); Louis van der Westhuizen 80'; Con: Rhyno Smith 9', 23', 46' (3/4); Benhard Janse van Rensburg (0/2); Cards: Walt Steenkamp (yellow card) 52' to 62'	Referee: Rodney Boneparte

14 March 2016	UP Tuks	43–8	UJ	FNB Stadium, Johannesburg
17:00	Try: Corniel Els 6'; André Warner 21' (4BP); Aston Fortuin 49'; Duncan Matthews 67'; Marco van Staden 78'; Con: Joshua Stander 7', 22', 68', 79' (4/5); Pen: Joshua Stander 18', 39' (2/2)	Report; Scoreboard	Try: Jannes Snyman 44'; Con: Divan Nel (0/1); Pen: Divan Nel 9' (1/1)	Referee: Cwengile Jadezweni

14 March 2016	Maties	60–13	UCT Ikey Tigers	FNB Stadium, Johannesburg
19:00	Try: John-Roy Jenkinson 9', 38' (2BP); Duncan Saal 22'; Edwill van der Merwe 31', 74' (4BP); Kobus van Dyk 55'; Craig Barry 71' (4BP); Con: Ernst Stapelberg 10', 23', 39', 56' (4/5); Chris Smith 72', 75' (2/2); Pen: Ernst Stapelberg 43' (1/1)	Report; Scoreboard	Try: Luke Stringer 77'; Con: Robert Anderson 78' (1/1); Pen: Tom Bednall 5', 12' (2/2)	Referee: Archie Sehlako

=== Round five ===
21 March 2016	NMMU Madibaz	46–33	UCT Ikey Tigers	FNB Stadium, Johannesburg
12:45	Try: Ivan-John du Preez 13' (4BP), 76'; Tyler Paul 26'; Brandon Brown 58'; Junior Pokomela 61' (2BP); SF Nieuwoudt 80' (2BP); Con: Simon Bolze 27' (1/2); Tom Kean 59', 62', 77' (3/4)	Report; Scoreboard	Try: Lihleli Xoli 3', 15' (4BP); Gary Porter 32'; Bradley Janse van Rensburg 54' (2BP); Con: Tom Bednall 4', 16' (2/4); Pen: Tom Bednall 68' (1/1)	Referee: Stephan Geldenhuys

21 March 2016	NWU Pukke	12–56	Maties	FNB Stadium, Johannesburg
14:45	Try: Malherbe Swart 19'; Benhard Janse van Rensburg 44'; Con: Rhyno Smith 45' (1/2)	Report; Scoreboard	Try: Craig Barry 13', 54' (2BP); Edwill van der Merwe 27' (4BP); Paul Streicher 34' (4BP); Beyers de Villiers 39'; Duncan Saal 68' (2BP); Con: Ernst Stapelberg 14', 28', 55', 69' (4/6); Pen: Ernst Stapelberg 52', 62' (2/2)	Referee: Ben Crouse

21 March 2016	CUT Ixias	25–68	UP Tuks	FNB Stadium, Johannesburg
16:45	Try: Darren Baron 23' (4BP); Jasper Wiese 31'; Vincent Maruping 40' (2BP); Con: Darren Baron 24', 32' (2/3); Pen: Meyer van Tonder (0/1); Darren Baron (0/1)	Report; Scoreboard	Try: Duncan Matthews 9'; Duhan van der Merwe 18', 66' (2BP); Riaan Britz 25', 54' (2BP), 56' (4BP); André Warner 62' (4BP); Luke van der Smit 70' (2BP); Con: Joshua Stander 9', 19', 26', 57', 63', 67', 71' (7/8); Cards: Eli Snyman (yellow card) 39' to 49'	Referee: AJ Jacobs

21 March 2016	UFS Shimlas	49–72	UJ	FNB Stadium, Johannesburg
19:00	Try: Mosolwa Mafuma 10' (4BP); Arthur Williams 32' (2BP); Stephan Janse van Rensburg 54' (2BP); Boela Venter 76' (4BP); Vuyani Maqina 79' (2BP); Con: Pieter-Steyn de Wet 11', 33', 55', 77', 80' (5/5)	Report; Scoreboard	Try: Ronald Brown 12' (4BP), 27' (2BP); David Antonites 18' (2BP); Bradley Moolman 29' (4BP); Caswell Khoza 58' (2BP); Wian Conradie 64' (2BP); Robert de Bruyn 71'; Con: Divan Nel 13', 19', 28', 30', 59', 65' (6/7); Pen: Divan Nel 5', 47', 63' (3/3); Cards: Emmanuel Morowane (yellow card) 78'	Referee: Rasta Rasivhenge

=== Round six ===
24 March 2016	UP Tuks	45–23	NMMU Madibaz	Cape Town Stadium, Cape Town
13:00	Try: Corniel Els 23' penalty try 40'; Riaan Britz 41' (2BP); Dries Swanepoel 45' (4BP); Luke van der Smit 47' (4BP); Con: Joshua Stander 23', 40', 42', 46', 48' (5/5); Cards: Gerrit Engelbrecht (yellow card) 75'	Report; Scoreboard	Try: Tyler Paul 29' (4BP); Lindelwe Zungu 38'; Ivan-John du Preez 58'; Con: Tom Kean 39', 58' (2/3); Cards: SF Nieuwoudt (yellow card) 39' to 50'	Referee: Jaco Kotze

24 March 2016	UJ	63–0	UCT Ikey Tigers	Cape Town Stadium, Cape Town
15:00	Try: David Antonites 5' (2BP); Aphiwe Dyantyi 16', 80' (4BP); Robert de Bruyn 24' (2BP); Jannes Snyman 27' (4BP), 37'; Jeremy Jordaan 57'; Bradley Moolman 68'; Con: Divan Nel 6', 28' (2/6); Ronald Brown 68', 80' (2/2); Pen: Divan Nel 47' (1/2); Cards: Siya Nzuzo (yellow card) 40' to 50'	Report; Scoreboard	Cards: Olwethu Hans (yellow card) 15' to 24'	Referee: Lourens van der Merwe

24 March 2016	NWU Pukke	44–14	CUT Ixias	Cape Town Stadium, Cape Town
17:00	Try: Jeandré Rudolph 22'; Lucian Cupido 27' (2BP); Louis van der Westhuizen 43' (4BP); Bart le Roux 53'; Malherbe Swart 65' (2BP); Con: Rhyno Smith 23', 44', 53', 65' (4/5); Pen: Rhyno Smith 75' (1/2); Cards: Jeandré Rudolph (yellow card) 32' to 44'; Walt Steenkamp (yellow card) 48' to 61'	Report; Scoreboard	Try: Johann Grundlingh 50'; Len Noort 61'; Con: Meyer van Tonder 50', 61' (2/2)	Referee: Rasta Rasivhenge

24 March 2016	Maties	35–14	UFS Shimlas	Cape Town Stadium, Cape Town
19:00	Try: Remu Malan 9' (4BP) penalty try 17'; Edwill van der Merwe 28'; Ernst Stapelberg 48'; Kobus van Dyk 74'; Con: Ernst Stapelberg 18', 49', 75' (3/5); Cards: Remu Malan (yellow card) 35' to 44'; Craig Barry (yellow card) 78'	Report; Scoreboard	Try: Mosolwa Mafuma 3'; Arthur Williams 39'; Con: Marco Mason 3', 40' (2/2); Cards: Teunis Nieuwoudt (yellow card) 17' to 27'	Referee: Cwengile Jadezweni

=== Round seven ===
28 March 2016	UCT Ikey Tigers	25–100	UP Tuks	Cape Town Stadium, Cape Town
12:45	Try: Guy Alexander 16' (2BP); Robert Anderson 41' (4BP), 45' (4BP); Con: Tom Bednall (0/1); Robert Anderson (0/2)	Report; Scoreboard	Try: Duhan van der Merwe 12' (2BP), 20' (4BP), 22' (4BP), 59' (2BP), 75' (2BP), 78' (4BP) (Note: The SARU match report erroneously duplicated Duhan van der Merwe's 12th minute try and Joshua Stander's subsequent conversion. These were omitted from the match scorers and top scorers list. The match report originally listed a 51st minute try and subsequent conversion by Tinus de Beer, which was subsequently removed, presumably to attempt to fix the extra try. However, the Varsity Cup match report lists De Beer as a try scorer and the half-time score of 63–7 indicates that this try was only scored in the second half. The 78th minute try scorer is listed as Jan Enslin, while the Varsity Cup match report lists this as Duhan van der Merwe. A match report from Netwerk24 backs up the Varsity Cup scorecard, so those scorers were used.); Dries Swanepoel 18' (2BP); Ruan Steenkamp 27'; Clyde Davids 33' (4BP); Jan Enslin 38'; Tinus de Beer 51'; Con: Joshua Stander 13', 19', 21', 23', 28', 33' (6/7); Tinus de Beer 52', 60', 78' (3/4); Pen: Tinus de Beer 80' (1/1); Cards: Clyde Davids (yellow card) 18'; Fred Eksteen (yellow card) 43' to 57'	Referee: Cwengile Jadezweni

28 March 2016	CUT Ixias	35–26	NMMU Madibaz	Cape Town Stadium, Cape Town
15:15	Try: Dean Rossouw 29'; Mauro Bucuchane 39'; Jasper Wiese 68'; Len Noort 73'; Meyer van Tonder 78' (2BP); Con: Meyer van Tonder 30', 40', 68', 74' (4/5) (Note: The SARU match report lists the 30th minute conversion as missed by Meyer van Tonder, but the Varsity Cup match report indicates he converted four tries, with their official Twitter feed confirming it was converted.); Pen: Meyer van Tonder (0/1)	Report; Scoreboard	Try: Riaan Esterhuizen 25'; NJ Oosthuizen 51'; Tyler Paul 55' (4BP); Con: Simon Bolze 26', 56' (2/3); Pen: Tom Kean 63' (1/1); Cards: Luvo Claassen (yellow card) 27' to 38'; Marzuq Maarman (yellow card) 28' to 39'; Elandré van der Merwe (yellow card) 72'	Referee: Lourens van der Merwe

28 March 2016	NWU Pukke	37–21	UFS Shimlas	Cape Town Stadium, Cape Town
17:05	Try: Lucian Cupido 3'; Jeandré Rudolph 17', 35' (2BP); Wilmar Arnoldi 23' (2BP); Con: Rhyno Smith 18', 23' (2/4) (Note: The SARU match report lists the 18th minute conversion as missed by Rhyno Smith, but the Varsity Cup match report indicates he converted two tries, with their official Twitter feed confirming it was converted.); Pen: Rhyno Smith 15' (1/1); Benhard Janse van Rensburg 70', 80' (2/2); Cards: Jaco Jordaan (yellow card) 66'	Report; Scoreboard	Try: Arthur Williams 20', 75'; Elandré Huggett 61'; Con: Marco Mason 21' (1/1); Pieter-Steyn de Wet 62', 76' (2/2)	Referee: AJ Jacobs

28 March 2016	UJ	42–16	Maties	Cape Town Stadium, Cape Town
19:00	Try: Ronald Brown 33'; Kobus Porter 39' (4BP); Caswell Khoza 67'; Etienne Oosthuizen 69'; Con: Divan Nel 34', 40', 70' (3/4); Pen: Divan Nel 8', 17', 63' (3/3); Drop: Divan Nel 21' (1/1)	Report; Scoreboard	Try: Brandon Asher-Wood 5' (4BP); Carlisle Nel 81' (2BP); Con: Chris Smith (0/2); Cards: Chris Smit (yellow card) 34' to 41'	Referee: Francois Pretorius

== Play-offs ==
Semi-finals
4 April 2016
UJ	07
NWU Pukke	35
4 April 2016
Maties	49
UP Tuks	11

Final
11 April 2016
Maties	06
NWU Pukke	07

=== Semi-finals ===
4 April 2016
16:30

UJ	7–35	NWU Pukke
Try: Devon Maré 33'; Con: Divan Nel 34' (1/1); Pen: Divan Nel (0/2)	Report; Scoreboard	Try: Sylvian Mahuza 8' (2BP), 38' (4BP); Con: Rhyno Smith 9', 39' (2/2); Pen: Rhyno Smith 2', 37', 65', 78' (4/5); Drop: Rhyno Smith 40' (1/1)

UJ Stadium, Johannesburg
Referee: Archie Sehlako

4 April 2016
19:00

Maties	49–11	UP Tuks
Try: Edwill van der Merwe 4'; Brandon Asher-Wood 16' (2BP); Beyers de Villiers 36', 49'; Remu Malan 74'; Con: Ernst Stapelberg 5', 17', 37', 50', 75' (5/5); Pen: Ernst Stapelberg 13', 30', 44', 79' (4/4)	Report; Scoreboard	Try: Dries Swanepoel 31' (4BP); Con: Joshua Stander 32' (1/1)

Danie Craven Stadium, Stellenbosch
Referee: AJ Jacobs

=== Final ===
11 April 2016
19:00

Maties	6–7	NWU Pukke
Pen: Chris Smith 46', 50' (2/3); Drop: Chris Smith (0/1); Cards: Chris Smit (yellow card) 83'; Remu Malan (yellow card) 88'	Report; Scoreboard	Try: Marno Redelinghuys 89'; Con: Rhyno Smith 90' (1/1)

Danie Craven Stadium, Stellenbosch
Referee: Lourens van der Merwe

Maties	NWU Pukke

FB	15	Craig Barry
RW	14	Brandon Asher-Wood
OC	13	Paul Streicher
IC	12	Chris Smit
LW	11	Edwill van der Merwe
FH	10	Ernst Stapelberg
SH	9	Remu Malan
N8	8	Kobus van Dyk
OF	7	Janco Venter
BF	6	Beyers de Villiers (c)
RL	5	Wilhelm van der Sluys
LL	4	Ian Groenewald
TP	3	Jacobus van der Merwe
HK	2	Johan Kirsten
LP	1	Chippie Oelofse
Replacements:
	16	Marko Janse van Rensburg
	17	Wesley Adonis
	18	Sidney Labuschagne
	19	Saud Abrahams
	20	Bjorn Bernardo
	21	Chris Smith
	22	Duncan Saal
	23	Johannes Kleinhans
Coach:
Hawies Fourie

FB	15	Rhyno Smith
RW	14	Lucian Cupido
OC	13	Johan Deysel
IC	12	Hendrik Marais
LW	11	Sylvian Mahuza
FH	10	Barend Janse van Rensburg
SH	9	Malherbe Swart
N8	8	Jeandre Rudolph (c)
OF	7	Marno Redelinghuys
BF	6	Jaco Jordaan
RL	5	Walt Steenkamp
LL	4	Neil Morrison
TP	3	Bart le Roux
HK	2	Wilmar Arnoldi
LP	1	Mashudu Mafela
Replacements:
	16	Louis van der Westhuizen
	17	Joe Smith
	18	Ruan Venter
	19	Tiaan Liebenberg
	20	Kurshwill Williams
	21	Akhona Nela
	22	Dean Stokes
	23	Mogau Mabokela
Coach:
Jonathan Mokuena

Player of the Match:
TBC NWU Eagles

== Honours ==
The honour roll for the 2016 Varsity Cup was as follows:

2016 Varsity Cup Honours
Champions:	NWU Pukke
Player That Rocks:	Mosolwa Mafuma, UFS Shimlas
Forward That Rocks:	Beyers de Villiers, Maties
Back That Rocks:	Craig Barry, Maties
Top Try Scorers:	Duhan van der Merwe, UP Tuks (10)
Top Points Scorer:	Divan Nel, UJ (84)

== Players ==
=== Player statistics ===
The following table contain points that were scored in the 2016 Varsity Cup:

All point scorers
No	Player	Team	T	TB	C	P	DG	Pts
1	Divan Nel	UJ	0	0	18	15	1	84
2	Ernst Stapelberg	Maties	2	0	24	8	0	82
3	Rhyno Smith	NWU Pukke	0	0	21	10	1	75
4	Duhan van der Merwe	UP Tuks	10	24	0	0	0	74
5	Joshua Stander	UP Tuks	0	0	29	4	0	70
6	Sylvian Mahuza	NWU Pukke	6	14	0	0	0	44
7	Mosolwa Mafuma	UFS Shimlas	6	10	0	0	0	40
7	Edwill van der Merwe	Maties	6	10	0	0	0	40
9	Riaan Britz	UP Tuks	5	12	0	0	0	37
9	Duncan Saal	Maties	5	12	0	0	0	37
11	Benhard Janse van Rensburg	NWU Pukke	4	8	0	2	0	34
11	Arthur Williams	UFS Shimlas	6	4	0	0	0	34
13	Aphiwe Dyantyi	UJ	4	10	0	0	0	30
13	Marco Mason	UFS Shimlas	1	0	11	1	0	30
15	Robert Anderson	UCT Ikey Tigers	2	8	2	2	0	28
15	Meyer van Tonder	CUT Ixias	1	2	6	3	0	28
17	Ivan-John du Preez	NMMU Madibaz	4	6	0	0	0	26
18	Ronald Brown	UJ	3	6	2	0	0	25
18	Beyers de Villiers	Maties	5	0	0	0	0	25
18	Dries Swanepoel	UP Tuks	3	10	0	0	0	25
21	Stephan Janse van Rensburg	UFS Shimlas	2	4	3	1	0	23
21	Tyler Paul	NMMU Madibaz	3	8	0	0	0	23
23	Jeandré Rudolph	NWU Pukke	4	2	0	0	0	22
24	Craig Barry	Maties	3	6	0	0	0	21
24	Simon Bolze	NMMU Madibaz	0	0	6	3	0	21
26	Kobus van Dyk	Maties	4	0	0	0	0	20
27	Pieter-Steyn de Wet	UFS Shimlas	1	0	7	0	0	19
27	Jannes Snyman	UJ	3	4	0	0	0	19
29	Darren Baron	CUT Ixias	1	4	3	1	0	18
29	André Warner	UP Tuks	2	8	0	0	0	18
31	Wilmar Arnoldi	NWU Pukke	3	2	0	0	0	17
31	Lucian Cupido	NWU Pukke	3	2	0	0	0	17
33	Brandon Asher-Wood	Maties	2	6	0	0	0	16
33	Luke van der Smit	UP Tuks	2	6	0	0	0	16
35	Corniel Els	UP Tuks	3	0	0	0	0	15
35	Tom Kean	NMMU Madibaz	0	0	6	1	0	15
37	David Antonites	UJ	2	4	0	0	0	14
37	Tinus de Beer	UP Tuks	1	0	3	1	0	14
37	Remu Malan	Maties	2	4	0	0	0	14
37	Bradley Moolman	UJ	2	4	0	0	0	14
37	Paul Streicher	Maties	2	4	0	0	0	14
37	Louis van der Westhuizen	NWU Pukke	2	4	0	0	0	14
37	Lihleli Xoli	UCT Ikey Tigers	2	4	0	0	0	14
44	Tom Bednall	UCT Ikey Tigers	0	0	2	3	0	13
45	Robert de Bruyn	UJ	2	2	0	0	0	12
45	John-Roy Jenkinson	Maties	2	2	0	0	0	12
45	Caswell Khoza	UJ	2	2	0	0	0	12
45	Malherbe Swart	NWU Pukke	2	2	0	0	0	12
49	Brandon Brown	NMMU Madibaz	2	0	0	0	0	10
49	Craig Corbett	Maties	2	0	0	0	0	10
49	Jeremy Jordaan	UJ	2	0	0	0	0	10
49	Bart le Roux	NWU Pukke	2	0	0	0	0	10
49	Duncan Matthews	UP Tuks	2	0	0	0	0	10
49	Len Noort	CUT Ixias	2	0	0	0	0	10
49	Chris Smith	Maties	0	0	2	2	0	10
49	Ruan Steenkamp	UP Tuks	2	0	0	0	0	10
49	Walt Steenkamp	NWU Pukke	2	0	0	0	0	10
49	Jasper Wiese	CUT Ixias	2	0	0	0	0	10
59	Clyde Davids	UP Tuks	1	4	0	0	0	9
59	Kobus Porter	UJ	1	4	0	0	0	9
59	Warren Swarts	NMMU Madibaz	1	4	0	0	0	9
59	Conraad van Vuuren	UFS Shimlas	1	4	0	0	0	9
59	Keanan van Wyk	UP Tuks	1	4	0	0	0	9
59	Boela Venter	UFS Shimlas	1	4	0	0	0	9
65	Guy Alexander	UCT Ikey Tigers	1	2	0	0	0	7
65	Wian Conradie	UJ	1	2	0	0	0	7
65	Nardus Erasmus	UFS Shimlas	1	2	0	0	0	7
65	Bradley Janse van Rensburg	UCT Ikey Tigers	1	2	0	0	0	7
65	Jaco Jordaan	NWU Pukke	1	2	0	0	0	7
65	Kevin Kaba	NMMU Madibaz	1	2	0	0	0	7
65	Rico Lategan	UCT Ikey Tigers	1	2	0	0	0	7
65	Vincent Maruping	CUT Ixias	1	2	0	0	0	7
65	Vuyani Maqina	UFS Shimlas	1	2	0	0	0	7
65	Chase Morison	UFS Shimlas	1	2	0	0	0	7
65	Carlisle Nel	Maties	1	2	0	0	0	7
65	Nate Nel	UCT Ikey Tigers	1	2	0	0	0	7
65	Yamkela Ngam	NMMU Madibaz	1	2	0	0	0	7
65	SF Nieuwoudt	NMMU Madibaz	1	2	0	0	0	7
65	Junior Pokomela	NMMU Madibaz	1	2	0	0	0	7
65	Jayson Reinecke	NMMU Madibaz	1	2	0	0	0	7
81	Andrew Beerwinkel	UP Tuks	1	0	0	0	0	5
81	Renier Botha	UFS Shimlas	1	0	0	0	0	5
81	Mauro Bucuchane	CUT Ixias	1	0	0	0	0	5
81	Hilio de Abreu	UCT Ikey Tigers	0	0	1	1	0	5
81	Jan Enslin	UP Tuks	1	0	0	0	0	5
81	Riaan Esterhuizen	NMMU Madibaz	1	0	0	0	0	5
81	Aston Fortuin	UP Tuks	1	0	0	0	0	5
81	Neethling Fouché	UP Tuks	1	0	0	0	0	5
81	Johann Grundlingh	CUT Ixias	1	0	0	0	0	5
81	Elandré Huggett	UFS Shimlas	1	0	0	0	0	5
81	Nicolaas Immelman	UFS Shimlas	1	0	0	0	0	5
81	Marco Klopper	UFS Shimlas	1	0	0	0	0	5
81	Ivan Ludick	NMMU Madibaz	1	0	0	0	0	5
81	Marzuq Maarman	NMMU Madibaz	1	0	0	0	0	5
81	Devon Maré	UJ	1	0	0	0	0	5
81	Emmanuel Morowane	UJ	1	0	0	0	0	5
81	Brendon Nell	Maties	1	0	0	0	0	5
81	Khanyo Ngcukana	UCT Ikey Tigers	1	0	0	0	0	5
81	Teunis Nieuwoudt	UFS Shimlas	1	0	0	0	0	5
81	Etienne Oosthuizen	UJ	1	0	0	0	0	5
81	NJ Oosthuizen	NMMU Madibaz	1	0	0	0	0	5
81	Gary Porter	UCT Ikey Tigers	1	0	0	0	0	5
81	Marno Redelinghuys	NWU Pukke	1	0	0	0	0	5
81	Dean Rossouw	CUT Ixias	1	0	0	0	0	5
81	Luke Stringer	UCT Ikey Tigers	1	0	0	0	0	5
81	Clinton Toua	CUT Ixias	1	0	0	0	0	5
81	Marco van Staden	UP Tuks	1	0	0	0	0	5
81	Keanu Vers	NMMU Madibaz	1	0	0	0	0	5
81	PJ Walters	UJ	1	0	0	0	0	5
81	Lindelwe Zungu	NMMU Madibaz	1	0	0	0	0	5
—	penalty try	UP Tuks	2	2	0	0	0	12
—	penalty try	Maties	1	0	0	0	0	5
—	penalty try	NWU Pukke	1	0	0	0	0	5
—	penalty try	UJ	1	0	0	0	0	5
Note: Two or four Conversions count three points, while penalties and drop goals count two points. * Legend: T = Tries, TB = Try bonus points, C = Conversions, P = Penalties, DG = Drop Goals, Pts = Points.

=== Squads ===
The following squads were named for the 2016 Varsity Cup:

2016 CUT Ixias squad
Forwards	Gerard Baard • Justin Basson • Junior Burger • Wikus Davis • Johann Grundlingh • Günther Janse van Vuuren • Sylvester Makakole • George Marich • Vincent Maruping • Rayno Nel • Len Noort • Dean Rossouw • SJ Roux • Neil Schoombee • Theunis Truter • Cameron van Heerden • Jean Volkwyn • Jasper Wiese • Did not play: • Stefan Kruger • JJ Nell • Bester Olivier • Ian Smith • Ian van Wyk
Backs	Darren Baron • Mauro Bucuchane • Marius Grobler • Charlie Hitchcock • Henry Immelman • Dean Jacobs • Tiisetso Madonsela • Ali Mgijima • Lethole Mokoena • Olwethu Ndakisa • Johan Nel • Mosego Toolo • Clinton Toua • Meyer van Tonder • Ruan Wasserman • Did not play: • Jesse du Toit • Muller Joubert
Coach	Skillie Bester

2016 Maties squad
Forwards	Saud Abrahams • Wesley Adonis • Conal Brown • Craig Corbett • Beyers de Villiers • Ian Groenewald • Martin Groenewald • Marko Janse van Rensburg • John-Roy Jenkinson • Freddie Kirsten • Boeta Kleinhans • Robey Labuschagné • Geor Malan • Derick Marais • Justin Moberly • Johan Momsen • Niel Oelofse • Martin Oosthuizen • Tyron Schultz • Jacobus van der Merwe • Wilhelm van der Sluys • Kobus van Dyk • Janco Venter • Did not play: • Iver Aanhuizen • Michael Smuts de Waal • CF du Toit • Hadley Hendricks • Liam Hendricks • Devon Nash • Francois Jacobus van der Merwe
Backs	Brandon Asher-Wood • Craig Barry • Bjorn Bernardo • SP Ferreira • Carlton Fortune • Remu Malan • Carlisle Nel • Brendon Nell • Duncan Saal • Chris Smit • Chris Smith • Ernst Stapelberg • Kyle Steyn • Paul Streicher • Edwill van der Merwe • Braam Venter • Jason Worrall • Did not play: • Eduan Keyter • Ronald Rijk Albertus Melck • Louis Nel • James Edward Vorster
Coach	Hawies Fourie

2016 NMMU Madibaz squad
Forwards	Tango Balekile • Ronnie Beyl • Brandon Brown • Wynand Grassmann • Jedwyn Harty • Gerrit Huisamen • JP Jamieson • Kevin Kaba • Marzuq Maarman • SF Nieuwoudt • Andisa Ntsila • NJ Oosthuizen • Tyler Paul • Junior Pokomela • Jayson Reinecke • Nemo Roelofse • Hayden Tharratt • Elandré van der Merwe • Warrick Venter • Did not play: • Lusanda Badiyana • Greg Jackson • JP Jonck • Sintu Manjezi • Roché van Zyl • CJ Velleman • Xandré Vos
Backs	Simon Bolze • Luvo Claassen • Ivan-John du Preez • Riaan Esterhuizen • Andile Jho • Tom Kean • Ivan Ludick • Khaya Malotana • Yamkela Ngam • Sibusiso Ngcokovane • Luan Nieuwoudt • Warren Swarts • Keanu Vers • Jeremy Ward • Lindelwe Zungu • Did not play: • Davron Cameron • Malcolm Jaer • Somila Jho • Garrick Mattheus • Athi Mayinje • Charles Radebe • Franswa Ueckermann • Courtney Winnaar
Coach	David Maidza

2016 NWU-Pukke squad
Forwards	Wilmar Arnoldi • Dewald Dekker • Danie Jordaan • Jaco Jordaan • Bart le Roux • Tiaan Liebenberg • Mogau Mabokela • Mash Mafela • Loftus Morrison • Marno Redelinghuys • Jeandré Rudolph • Joe Smith • Walt Steenkamp • Gideon van der Merwe • Louis van der Westhuizen • Ruan Venter • Did not play: • Wian Fourie • Louis Grey • Roan Grobbelaar • Funani Mabala • DJ Putter • Bhekisa Shongwe • Dolf van Deventer • Estehan Visagie
Backs	Lucian Cupido • Johan Deysel • Schalk Hugo • Benhard Janse van Rensburg • Sylvian Mahuza • Henko Marais • Nkululeko Mcuma • Akhona Nela • Elden Schoeman • Chriswill September • Rhyno Smith • Dean Stokes • Malherbe Swart • Ryno Wepener • Percy Williams • Did not play: • Jaco Hayward • Eswyn Heyns • Tapiwa Mafura • Alvino Montjies • Francois Nel • Ryno Pienaar • Gene Willemse
Coach	Jonathan Mokuena

2016 UCT Ikey Tigers squad
Forwards	Guy Alexander • Joel Carew • Brenton Greaves • Olwethu Hans • Jason Klaasen • Jade Kriel • Michael Kumbirai • Jayson Landman • David Maasch • Struan Murray • Sean Paterson • Gary Porter • Mark Prior • Duncan Saffy • Alva Senderayi • Luke Stringer • Nyasha Tarusenga • Samuel Theron • Keagan Timm • Msizi Zondi • Did not play: • Brendan Ross Clements • Alex Goldstein • Aphiwe Qaba • Stuart Stopforth • Tino Zakeyo
Backs	Robert Anderson • Kofi Appiah • Tom Bednall • Suwi Chibale • Hilio de Abreu • Justin Heunis • Bradley Janse van Rensburg • Rico Lategan • Nate Nel • Khanyo Ngcukana • Gerard Pieterse • Sebastian Roodt • Joel Smith • Dylan-Lee Tidbury • Steve Wallace • Lihleli Xoli • Did not play: • Stefano de Gouveia • Paul Hendry • Rayno Mapoe • Jesse Wilensky
Coach	Hanyani Shimange

2016 UFS Shimlas squad
Forwards	Anrich Alberts • Murray Bondesio • Dolph Botha • Neil Claassen • Nardus Erasmus • Elandré Huggett • Nicolaas Immelman • Thabiso Khanye • Marco Klopper • Johan Kotze • Willandré Kotzenberg • Daniel Maartens • Musa Mahlasela • Chase Morison • Ox Nché • Teunis Nieuwoudt • Fiffy Rampeta • Conraad van Vuuren • Boela Venter • Reinach Venter • Ntokozo Vidima • Dennis Visser • Did not play: • De Wet Kruger • Hennie-Schalk Theron
Backs	Renier Botha • Carel-Jan Coetzee • Pieter-Steyn de Wet • Apiwe Dinga • Pieter Faber • Stephan Janse van Rensburg • Mosolwa Mafuma • Vuyani Maqina • Marco Mason • Sechaba Matsoele • Naldo Meyer • Zee Mkhabela • Armand Pretorius • Arthur Williams • Did not play: • Barend Bornman • TJ Goddard • Michael Coenraad Marx • Tanaks Takudzwa Matsinde • Francois Pretorius • Louis Venter
Coach	Hendro Scholtz

2016 UJ squad
Forwards	David Antonites • Derick Bezuidenhout • Wian Conradie • Nico du Plessis • Jeremy Jordaan • Kyle Kruger • Emmanuel Morowane • Siya Nzuzo • Etienne Oosthuizen • FP Pelser • Kobus Porter • Phenyo Seriteng • Jannes Snyman • Kyle van Dalen • Waldo Weideman • Did not play: • Dillon Bakos • Stephen Bhasera • Roelof Diedericks • Estian Enslin • Brendon Landsberg • Ethan Louw • Vernon Petersen
Backs	Ronald Brown • Robert de Bruyn • Aphiwe Dyantyi • Kobus Engelbrecht • Johan Esterhuizen • Caswell Khoza • Dominic Kroezen • Devon Maré • Bradley Moolman • Hilton Mudariki • Divan Nel • Andries Oosthuizen • Godfrey Ramaboea • PJ Walters • Did not play: • Jamie Campbell • Jaco Fourie
Coach	Skollie Janse van Rensburg

2016 UP Tuks squad
Forwards	Andrew Beerwinkel • FJ Binneman • Clyde Davids • Fred Eksteen • Corniel Els • Gerrit Engelbrecht • Jan Enslin • Aston Fortuin • Justin Forwood • Neethling Fouché • Du Toit Genis • Pieter Jansen van Vuren • Eli Snyman • Ruan Steenkamp • Luke van der Smit • Marco van Staden • Did not play: • Mervano da Silva • Pieter Griesel • Denzel Hill • Sam Mitchell • Hendré Stassen • Jsuan-re Swanepoel • Franco van den Berg • Dandré van der Westhuizen • Xander van Wyk • Heinrich Viljoen
Backs	Riaan Britz • Max Calitz • Tinus de Beer • Carlo Engelbrecht • Stedman Gans • Quaid Langeveldt • Adrian Maebane • Duncan Matthews • Joshua Stander • Dries Swanepoel • Duhan van der Merwe • Keanan van Wyk • André Warner • Did not play: • Daylan Daniels • Boeta Hamman • Alcino Izaacs • Andries Kruger • Theo Maree • Philip Orffer • Jacques Rossouw • Peet Schoeman • Francois Tredoux • Damian van Wyk • Impi Visser
Coach	Pote Human

=== Discipline ===
The following table contains all the cards handed out during the tournament:

Cards
Player	Team	Sent off (straight red)	Temporarily suspended
Chase Morison	UFS Shimlas	1	0
Jeandré Rudolph	NWU Pukke	0	3
Remu Malan	Maties	0	2
Teunis Nieuwoudt	UFS Shimlas	0	2
Chris Smit	Maties	0	2
Walt Steenkamp	NWU Pukke	0	2
Craig Barry	Maties	0	1
Ronald Brown	UJ	0	1
Joel Carew	UCT Ikey Tigers	0	1
Luvo Claassen	NMMU Madibaz	0	1
Wian Conradie	UJ	0	1
Clyde Davids	UP Tuks	0	1
Beyers de Villiers	Maties	0	1
Fred Eksteen	UP Tuks	0	1
Gerrit Engelbrecht	UP Tuks	0	1
Marius Grobler	CUT Ixias	0	1
Ian Groenewald	Maties	0	1
Olwethu Hans	UCT Ikey Tigers	0	1
Nicolaas Immelman	UFS Shimlas	0	1
Jaco Jordaan	NWU Pukke	0	1
Kevin Kaba	NMMU Madibaz	0	1
Michael Kumbirai	UCT Ikey Tigers	0	1
Marzuq Maarman	NMMU Madibaz	0	1
Marco Mason	UFS Shimlas	0	1
Emmanuel Morowane	UJ	0	1
SF Nieuwoudt	NMMU Madibaz	0	1
Siya Nzuzo	UJ	0	1
Etienne Oosthuizen	UJ	0	1
Eli Snyman	UP Tuks	0	1
Elandré van der Merwe	NMMU Madibaz	0	1
* Legend: (red card) = Sent off, (yellow card) = Sin-binned

== Referees ==
The following referees officiated matches in the 2016 Varsity Cup:

- Rodney Boneparte
- Ben Crouse
- Stephan Geldenhuys
- AJ Jacobs
- Cwengile Jadezweni
- Jaco Kotze
- Sindile Ngcese
- Francois Pretorius
- Rasta Rasivhenge
- Archie Sehlako
- Lourens van der Merwe

== See also ==
- Varsity Cup
- 2016 Varsity Rugby
- 2016 Varsity Shield
- 2016 Gold Cup
