= 2016 Varsity Shield =

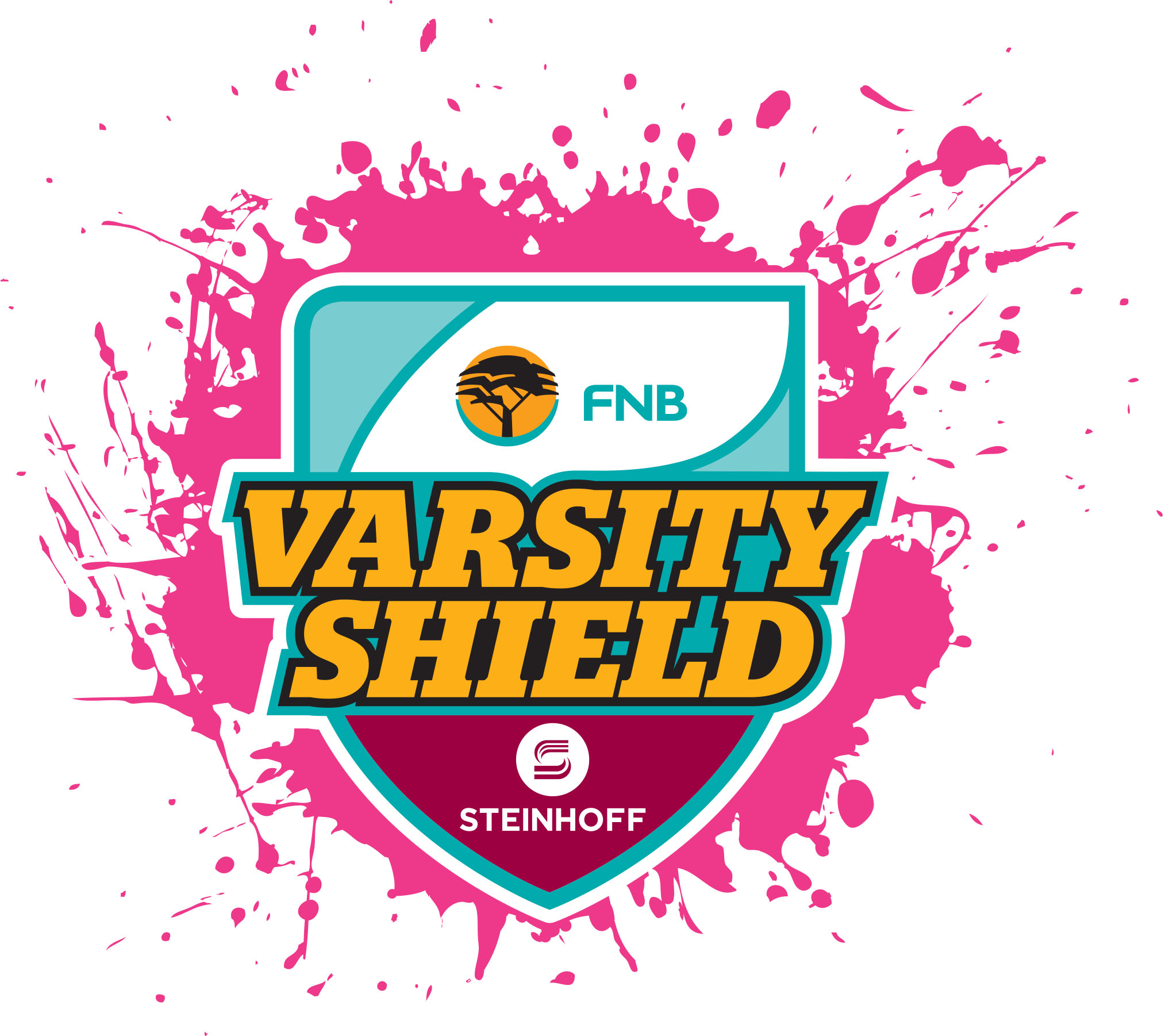
- Countries: South Africa
- Date: 1 February 2016 — 18 April 2016
- Champions: Wits (2nd title)
- Runners-up: UWC
- Promoted: Wits
- Relegated: None
- Matches played: 21
- Tries scored: 165 (average 7.9 per match)
- Top point scorer: Tristan Tedder (114)
- Top try scorer: Thobekani Buthelezi (9)

The 2016 Varsity Shield was contested from 1 February to 18 April 2016. The tournament (also known as the FNB Varsity Shield presented by Steinhoff International for sponsorship reasons) was the sixth season of the Varsity Shield, an annual second-tier inter-university rugby union competition featuring five South African universities.

Following a disruption during the Varsity Cup Round Three match between UFS Shimlas and NMMU Madibaz and general unrest on various university campuses, all fixtures scheduled for 29 February were postponed to 4 April, with the semi-finals and final also postponed by a week. On 1 March, it was also announced that the round of matches scheduled for 7 March would also be postponed, with the situation at various universities being monitored to determine when the competition will resume. After a meeting by the executive management of Varsity Rugby on 9 March, it was decided that all remaining matches in the competition would be played at neutral venues and that matches should resume on 14 March.

The tournament was won by Wits for the second time; they beat UWC 39–2 in the final played on 18 April 2016. Wits was also promoted to the top-tier Varsity Cup competition for 2017.

== Competition rules and information ==
There were five participating universities in the 2015 Varsity Shield. These teams played each other twice over the course of the season, once at home and once away.

Teams received four points for a win and two points for a draw. Bonus points were awarded to teams that scored four or more tries in a game, as well as to teams that lost a match by seven points or less. Teams were ranked by log points, then points difference (points scored less points conceded).

The top two teams qualified for the title play-offs. These teams played each other in the final, at the home venue of the higher-placed team.

The Varsity Shield winner was promoted to the 2017 Varsity Cup competition, while the bottom team in the Varsity Cup was relegated to the 2017 Varsity Shield. There was also a promotion/relegation match between the 7th-placed team in the Varsity Cup and the Varsity Shield runner-up at the end of the 2016 season. Three new universities will join the Varsity Shield in 2017.

The Varsity Shield used a different scoring system to the regular system. Tries were worth five points as usual, but conversions were worth three points, while penalties and drop goals were only worth two points.

== Teams ==
Location of teams in the 2016 Varsity Shield

2016 Varsity Shield teams
Team name	University	Stadium
TUT Vikings	Tshwane University of Technology	TUT Stadium, Pretoria
UFH Blues	University of Fort Hare	Davidson Rugby Field, Alice
UKZN Impi	University of KwaZulu-Natal	Howard College Rugby Stadium, Durban
UKZN Impi	University of KwaZulu-Natal	Peter Booysen Sports Park, Pietermaritzburg
UWC	University of the Western Cape	UWC Sport Stadium, Cape Town
Wits	University of the Witwatersrand	Wits Rugby Stadium, Johannesburg

== Standings ==
The final league standings for the 2016 Varsity Shield were:

2016 Varsity Shield standings
Pos	Team	P	W	D	L	PF	PA	PD	TF	TA	TB	LB	Pts
1	Wits	8	6	0	2	342	96	+246	50	12	6	1	31
2	UWC (Note: On 22 March 2016, the Varsity Cup Executive Committee announced that UFH Blues had two points deducted for fielding an ineligible player in their Round One match against UWC. In addition, UWC was awarded an additional point.)	8	5	0	3	179	186	−7	28	25	3	0	24
3	UKZN Impi (Note: On 5 April 2016, the Varsity Cup Executive Committee announced that UKZN Impi had twelve points deducted for fielding an ineligible player throughout the season. Despite previously qualifying to play in the Varsity Shield final and in a Varsity Cup promotion play-off against UCT Ikey Tigers, UKZN Impi were replaced by UWC in both these matches.)	8	7	0	1	382	144	+238	51	19	4	0	20
4	TUT Vikings	8	1	0	7	136	355	−219	17	50	2	2	8
5	UFH Blues	8	1	0	7	102	360	−258	14	54	1	2	5

Legend and competition rules
Legend:
Promoted to the 2017 Varsity Cup and qualifies to the final.	P = Games played, W = Games won, D = Games drawn, L = Games lost, PF = Points for, PA = Points against, PD = Points difference, TF = Tries for, TA = Tries against, TB = Try bonus points, LB = Losing bonus points, Pts = Log points
Runner-up; will qualify to the final.	P = Games played, W = Games won, D = Games drawn, L = Games lost, PF = Points for, PA = Points against, PD = Points difference, TF = Tries for, TA = Tries against, TB = Try bonus points, LB = Losing bonus points, Pts = Log points
Competition rules:
Play-offs: Wits and UWC qualified to the final, with Wits hosting UWC. Wits was automatically promoted to the 2017 Varsity Cup, while UWC qualified for a promotion play-off. Points breakdown: * 4 points for a win * 2 points for a draw * 1 bonus point for a loss by eight points or less * 1 bonus point for scoring four or more tries in a match

=== Round-by-round ===
Team Progression – 2016 Varsity Shield
Team	R1	R2	R3	R4	R5	R6	R7	R8	R9	R10	Final
Wits	1 (4th)	6 (2nd)	6 (3rd)	11 (2nd)	16 (2nd)	17 (2nd)	22 (1st)	22 (3rd)	27 (2nd)	32 (1st)	Won
UWC	4 (2nd)	4 (3rd)	8 (2nd)	8 (3rd)	8 (3rd)	13 (3rd)	18 (3rd)	24 (2nd)	24 (3rd)	24 (2nd)	Lost
UKZN Impi	4 (1st)	8 (1st)	13 (1st)	18 (1st)	18 (1st)	22 (1st)	22 (2nd)	27 (1st)	32 (1st)	20 (3rd)	—N/a
TUT Vikings	0 (5th)	0 (5th)	1 (5th)	2 (4th)	3 (5th)	3 (5th)	3 (5th)	3 (4th)	3 (4th)	8 (4th)	—N/a
UFH Blues	1 (3rd)	1 (4th)	1 (4th)	1 (5th)	5 (4th)	5 (4th)	5 (4th)	3 (5th)	3 (5th)	5 (5th)	—N/a
The table above shows a team's progression throughout the season. For each round, their cumulative points total is shown with the overall log position in brackets.
Key:	win	draw	loss	bye							

== Matches ==
The following matches were played in the 2016 Varsity Shield:

=== Round one ===
1 February 2016	UKZN Impi	26–18	Wits	Peter Booysen Sports Park, Pietermaritzburg
16:45	Try: Jaywinn Juries 34'; Michael Meyer 66'; Tristan Blewett 78'; Con: Curwin Bosch 35', 67', 79' (3/3); Pen: Curwin Bosch 20' (1/1); Drop: Curwin Bosch (0/2)	Report; Scoreboard; Video	Try: Thato Marobela 11'; CJ Conradie 40'; Constant Beckerling 49'; Con: Warren Gilbert 50' (1/3)	Referee: AJ Jacobs

1 February 2016	UFH Blues	8–15	UWC	Davidson Rugby Field, Alice
19:00	Try: Asiphe Fihla 80'; Con: Siviwe Bisset 81' (1/1)	Report; Scoreboard; Video	Try: Philbrey Joseph 27', 61'; Jason Marcus 78'; Con: Melik Wana (0/3)	Referee: Sindile Ngcese

Bye/s: TUT Vikings

=== Round two ===
8 February 2016	UWC	13–24	UKZN Impi	UWC Sport Stadium, Cape Town
18:30	Try: Jason Marcus 24'; Marcus Kleinbooi 42'; Con: Melik Wana 43' (1/2); Cards: Sabelo Dlamini (yellow card) 7' to 17'; Brandon Valentyn (yellow card) 55' to 65'	Report; Scoreboard; Video	Try: Zwela Zondi 8'; Kerron van Vuuren 57'; S'busiso Nkosi 72'; Con: Tristan Tedder 9', 58', 73' (3/3)	Referee: Egon Seconds

8 February 2016	Wits	53–0	TUT Vikings	Wits Rugby Stadium, Johannesburg
18:30	Try: Thato Marobela 10'; Conor Brockschmidt 27'; Constant Beckerling 32'; Ruan Macdonald 46', 60'; Ruan Cloete 51' penalty try 68'; Con: Warren Gilbert 28', 33', 47', 52', 60' (5/6); AJ van Blerk 69' (1/1)	Report; Scoreboard; Video	Cards: Lukas van Zyl (yellow card) 4' to 15'	Referee: Ben Crouse

Bye/s: UFH Blues

=== Round three ===
15 February 2016	TUT Vikings	15–21	UWC	TUT Stadium, Pretoria
18:30	Try: Claude Johannes 21'; Tshepo Nyathi 70'; Con: Lukas van Zyl 22' (1/2); Pen: Lukas van Zyl 32' (1/2); Drop: Lukas van Zyl (0/1); Cards: George Letshuma (yellow card) 60' to 71'; Chestwin Gaffley (yellow card) 73'	Report; Scoreboard	Try: Peter Wanjiru 11'; Courtney Cupido 26'; Byron Burgess 49'; Con: Darian Hock 27', 50' (2/3); Cards: Stuart Austin (yellow card) 60' to 71'; Tahriq Allan (yellow card) 69' to 79'	Referee: Jaco Pretorius

15 February 2016	UKZN Impi	58–10	UFH Blues	Peter Booysen Sports Park, Pietermaritzburg
18:30	Try: Thobekani Buthelezi 1', 25'; Kerron van Vuuren 9', 53'; Tristan Tedder 37'; Tristan Blewett 44'; Shayne Makombe 77'; Pierre van der Walt 80'; Con: Tristan Tedder 2', 10', 26', 38', 45' (5/6); Spa Dube 78' (1/2)	Scoreboard	Try: Sesethu Time 67'; Con: Akhona Matutu 68' (1/1); Pen: Siviwe Bisset 11' (1/1); Akhona Matutu (0/1)	Referee: Vusi Msibi

Bye/s: Wits

=== Round four ===
18 February 2016	TUT Vikings	30–63	UKZN Impi	TUT Stadium, Pretoria
18:30	Try: Calvin Maduna 8'; Tshepo Nyathi 28'; Chestwin Gaffley 30'; Shawn Jaards 61'; Con: Lukas van Zyl 9', 31' (2/3); Frank Abrahams (0/1); Pen: Lukas van Zyl 12', 34' (2/2)	Report; Scoreboard	Try: Jean Droste 3'; Grant Rattray 16'; S'busiso Nkosi 38', 57'; Curwin Bosch 41'; Andrew Acton 50'; Tristan Blewett 63', 80'; Tristan Tedder 72'; Con: Curwin Bosch 4', 42', 51' (3/5); Tristan Tedder 58', 63', 73' (3/4); Drop: Curwin Bosch (0/1); Cards: S'busiso Nkosi (yellow card) 66' to 76'	Referee: Oregopotse Rametsi

18 February 2016	UFH Blues	8–37	Wits	Davidson Rugby Field, Alice
18:30	Try: Elandre Sias 27'; Con: Siviwe Bisset 28' (1/1); Cards: Sibongile Novuka (yellow card) 36' to 46'; Zanoxolo Qwele (yellow card) 38' to 48'	Report; Scoreboard	Try: Constant Beckerling 4'; CJ Conradie 22', 39'; Josh Jarvis 31'; Conor Brockschmidt 47'; Con: Warren Gilbert 5', 23', 32', 48' (4/5); Cards: Craig Hume (yellow card) 72'	Referee: Rodney Boneparte

Bye/s: UWC

=== Round five ===
22 February 2016	UFH Blues	18–14	TUT Vikings	Davidson Rugby Field, Alice
18:30	Try: Asiphe Fihla 37'; Athenkosi Makeleni 70'; Aziyena Mandaba 79'; Con: Siviwe Bisset (0/1); Athiphila Mlotywa 71' (1/2); Pen: Siviwe Bisset (0/1); Cards: Zanoxolo Qwele (yellow card) 49' to 59'	Report; Scoreboard	Try: Dumisane Mthethwa 15'; Con: Lukas van Zyl 16' (1/1); Pen: Lukas van Zyl 57', 61', 73' (3/3)	Referee: Sindile Ngcese

22 February 2016	Wits	42–2	UWC	Wits Rugby Stadium, Johannesburg
18:30	Try: Luvuyo Pupuma 5', 51', 69'; Kwanele Ngema 18', 64', 76'; Con: Warren Gilbert 6', 19', 70', 77' (4/5); Pen: Warren Gilbert (0/1)	Report; Scoreboard	Pen: Aidynn Cupido 47' (1/1)	Referee: Oregopotse Rametsi

Bye/s: UKZN Impi

=== Round six ===
14 March 2016	UWC	30–5	UFH Blues	FNB Stadium, Johannesburg
15:00	Try: Gordon-Wayne Plaatjes 3'; Aidynn Cupido 7', 59'; Matthew le Roux 36'; Philbrey Joseph 44'; Minenhle Mthethwa 72'; Con: Aidynn Cupido (0/6)	Report; Scoreboard	Try: Misugukhosi Pienaar 48'; Con: Akhona Matutu (0/1); Cards: Zanoxolo Qwele (red card) 65'	Referee: Stephan Geldenhuys

14 March 2016	Wits	21–26	UKZN Impi	FNB Stadium, Johannesburg
13:00	Try: Tijde Visser 8'; CJ Conradie 12'; Josh Jarvis 37'; Con: Warren Gilbert 13', 38' (2/3); Cards: Sicelo Champion (yellow card) 69'	Report; Scoreboard	Try: Thobekani Buthelezi 44', 67'; Morné Joubert 58'; Con: Tristan Tedder 45', 59', 68' (3/3); Pen: Tristan Tedder 16' (1/1)	Referee: Jaco Pretorius

Bye/s: TUT Vikings

=== Round seven ===
19 March 2016	TUT Vikings	8–47	Wits	Rand Stadium, Johannesburg
10:00	Try: George Letshuma 32'; Con: Lukas van Zyl 33' (1/1)	Report; Scoreboard	Try: Josh Jarvis 10'; Luvuyo Pupuma 17', 49'; Kwanele Ngema 23'; Richard Crossman 46'; Ruan Macdonald 66'; Ayabulela Mdudi 81'; Con: Kyle Wesemann 18', 47', 50' (3/6); Luxolo Ntsepe 67' (1/1); Cards: Conor Brockschmidt (yellow card) 35' to 41'	Referee: Pieter Maritz

19 March 2016	UKZN Impi	16–44	UWC	Rand Stadium, Johannesburg
12:00	Try: Tristan Blewett 58'; Shayne Makombe 77'; Con: Tristan Tedder 58', 78' (2/2)	Report; Scoreboard	Try: Matthew Faught 3'; Aidynn Cupido 26', 73'; José Julies 61'; Dean Herbert 80'; Con: Aidynn Cupido 4', 27', 62', 74', 81' (5/5); Pen: Aidynn Cupido 13' (1/1); Drop: Aidynn Cupido 42' (1/1)	Referee: Paul Mente

Bye/s: UFH Blues

=== Round eight ===
21 March 2016	UFH Blues	0–97	UKZN Impi	Rand Stadium, Johannesburg
13:00	Pen: Akhona Matutu (0/1); Cards: Athiphila Mlotywa (yellow card) 26' to 35'; Siphesihle Punguzwa (yellow card) 39' to 50'; Sibusiso Sityebi (yellow card) 68'; Justin Riaan Antonie (yellow card) 73'	Report; Scoreboard	Try: Grant Rattray 2', 8'; Wikus Badenhorst 19'; Thobekani Buthelezi 23', 49'; Kerron van Vuuren 27'; Tristan Blewett 31', 69'; Marius Louw 53'; Blake Mingay 55'; Pierre van der Walt 58'; Ado Wessels 73'; Shayne Makombe 75', 79'; Con: Tristan Tedder 3', 31', 50', 54', 55', 58', 69', 73', 76' (9/14)	Referee: Mpho Matsaung

21 March 2016	UWC	41–16	TUT Vikings	Rand Stadium, Johannesburg
15:00	Try: José Julies 3', 39'; Brandon Valentyn 12'; Peter Wanjiru 23'; Clayton Daniels 29'; Dean Herbert 51'; Marcus Kleinbooi 74'; Con: Aidynn Cupido 30' (1/5); Darian Hock 51' (1/1); Yaasien Railoun (0/1); Cards: Matthew Faught (yellow card) 77'	Report; Scoreboard	Try: Christo Lategan 21'; Lukas van Zyl 26'; Con: Lukas van Zyl 22', 26' (2/2); Cards: Dumisane Mthethwa (yellow card) 57' to 69'	Referee: Paul Mente

Bye/s: Wits

=== Round nine ===
26 March 2016	Wits	64–13	UFH Blues	Rand Stadium, Johannesburg
9:00	Try: Rhyno Herbst 8', 14'; CJ Conradie 21', 67'; Constant Beckerling 50', 58'; Richard Crossman 53'; Sicelo Champion 69', 75', 78'; Conor Brockschmidt 72'; Con: Kyle Wesemann (0/3); Warren Gilbert 51', 53', 73' (3/8); Cards: Rhyno Herbst (yellow card) 62' to 73'	Report; Scoreboard	Try: Akhona Matutu 26'; Siviwe Bisset 46'; Con: Akhona Matutu 27' (1/2); Cards: Luyolo Batshise (red card) 21'	Referee: Ricus van der Hoven

26 March 2016	UKZN Impi	72–8	TUT Vikings	Rand Stadium, Johannesburg
15:00	Try: Thobekani Buthelezi 3', 42', 79'; Shayne Makombe 10'; Grant Rattray 23'; Marius Louw 31', 66'; Kerron van Vuuren 61'; John-Hubert Meyer 64'; Con: Tristan Tedder 4', 11', 24', 32', 43', 62', 65', 67', 80' (9/9); Drop: Tristan Tedder (0/1); Cards: Tristan Blewett (yellow card) 54' to 64'	Report; Scoreboard	Try: Kurt MacKay 53'; Con: Frank Abrahams 54' (1/1); Cards: George Letshuma (yellow card) 20'; Tshepo Nyathi (yellow card) 22'	Referee: Sindile Ngcese

Bye/s: UWC

=== Round ten ===
28 March 2016	UWC	13–60	Wits	FNB Stadium, Johannesburg
13:00	Try: Wayrin Losper 38'; Peter Wanjiru 71'; Con: Aidynn Cupido 72' (1/2)	Report; Scoreboard	Try: Sicelo Champion 19'; Josh Jarvis 21', 27'; Wade Worthington 40', 48'; CJ Conradie 59'; Kwanele Ngema 76'; Warren Gilbert 79'; Con: Warren Gilbert 20', 22', 40', 60', 77', 80' (6/8); Drop: Warren Gilbert 18' (1/1)	Referee: Jaco Pretorius

28 March 2016	TUT Vikings	45–40	UFH Blues	FNB Stadium, Johannesburg
15:00	Try: Ian Truter 4', 80'; Calvin Maduna 11'; Christo Lategan 31'; Tshepo Nyathi 38'; Claude Johannes 59'; Con: Shawn Jaards 12', 32', 39', 60', 81' (5/6)	Report; Scoreboard	Try: Lukho Jongizulu 20'; Sibongile Novuka 24'; Siviwe Bisset 28'; Luyolo Batshise 50'; Athiphila Mlotywa 74'; Con: Siviwe Bisset 21' (1/1); Elandre Sias 25', 29', 51', 75' (4/4); Cards: Elandre Sias (yellow card) 32' to 41'	Referee: Ruhan Meiring

Bye/s: UKZN Impi

=== Final ===
18 April 2016	Wits	39–2	UWC	Wits Rugby Stadium, Johannesburg
18:30	Try: Ruan Cloete 5'; Kyle Wesemann 14'; Graham Logan 40'; CJ Conradie 60'; Constant Beckerling 67'; Con: Warren Gilbert 14', 40', 61', 68' (4/5); Pen: Warren Gilbert (0/1); Drop: Warren Gilbert 29' (1/1)	Report; Scoreboard	Pen: Aidynn Cupido 12' (1/1)	Referee: Cwengile Jadezweni

== Honours ==
The honour roll for the 2016 Varsity Shield was as follows:

2016 Varsity Shield Honours
Champions:	Wits
Player That Rocks:	Thobekani Buthelezi, UKZN Impi
Forward That Rocks:	Rhyno Herbst, Wits
Back That Rocks:	Aidynn Cupido, UWC
Top Try Scorers:	Thobekani Buthelezi, UKZN Impi (9)
Top Points Scorer:	Tristan Tedder, UKZN Impi (114)

== Players ==
=== Player statistics ===
The following table contain points that were scored in the 2016 Varsity Shield:

All point scorers
No	Player	Team	T	C	P	DG	Pts
1	Tristan Tedder	UKZN Impi	2	34	1	0	114
2	Warren Gilbert	Wits	1	25	0	1	82
3	Aidynn Cupido	UWC	4	7	2	1	47
4	Thobekani Buthelezi	UKZN Impi	9	0	0	0	45
5	Lukas van Zyl	TUT Vikings	1	7	6	0	38
6	Tristan Blewett	UKZN Impi	7	0	0	0	35
6	CJ Conradie	Wits	7	0	0	0	35
8	Constant Beckerling	Wits	5	0	0	0	25
8	Curwin Bosch	UKZN Impi	1	6	1	0	25
8	Josh Jarvis	Wits	5	0	0	0	25
8	Shayne Makombe	UKZN Impi	5	0	0	0	25
8	Kwanele Ngema	Wits	5	0	0	0	25
8	Luvuyo Pupuma	Wits	5	0	0	0	25
8	Kerron van Vuuren	UKZN Impi	5	0	0	0	25
15	Siviwe Bisset	UFH Blues	2	3	1	0	21
16	Sicelo Champion	TUT Vikings	4	0	0	0	20
16	Shawn Jaards	TUT Vikings	1	5	0	0	20
16	Grant Rattray	UKZN Impi	4	0	0	0	20
19	Elandre Sias	UFH Blues	1	4	0	0	17
20	Conor Brockschmidt	Wits	3	0	0	0	15
20	Philbrey Joseph	UWC	3	0	0	0	15
20	José Julies	UWC	3	0	0	0	15
20	Marius Louw	UKZN Impi	3	0	0	0	15
20	Ruan Macdonald	Wits	3	0	0	0	15
20	S'busiso Nkosi	UKZN Impi	3	0	0	0	15
20	Tshepo Nyathi	TUT Vikings	3	0	0	0	15
20	Peter Wanjiru	UWC	3	0	0	0	15
28	Akhona Matutu	UFH Blues	1	2	0	0	11
29	Richard Crossman	Wits	2	0	0	0	10
29	Asiphe Fihla	UFH Blues	2	0	0	0	10
29	Dean Herbert	UWC	2	0	0	0	10
29	Rhyno Herbst	Wits	2	0	0	0	10
29	Claude Johannes	TUT Vikings	2	0	0	0	10
29	Marcus Kleinbooi	UWC	2	0	0	0	10
29	Christo Lategan	TUT Vikings	2	0	0	0	10
29	Calvin Maduna	TUT Vikings	2	0	0	0	10
29	Jason Marcus	UWC	2	0	0	0	10
29	Thato Marobela	Wits	2	0	0	0	10
29	Ian Truter	TUT Vikings	2	0	0	0	10
29	Pierre van der Walt	UKZN Impi	2	0	0	0	10
29	Wade Worthington	Wits	2	0	0	0	10
42	Darian Hock	UWC	0	3	0	0	9
42	Kyle Wesemann	Wits	0	3	0	0	9
44	Athiphila Mlotywa	UFH Blues	1	1	0	0	8
45	Andrew Acton	UKZN Impi	1	0	0	0	5
45	Wikus Badenhorst	UKZN Impi	1	0	0	0	5
45	Luyolo Batshise	UFH Blues	1	0	0	0	5
45	Byron Burgess	UWC	1	0	0	0	5
45	Ruan Cloete	Wits	1	0	0	0	5
45	Courtney Cupido	UWC	1	0	0	0	5
45	Clayton Daniels	UWC	1	0	0	0	5
45	Jean Droste	UKZN Impi	1	0	0	0	5
45	Matthew Faught	UWC	1	0	0	0	5
45	Chestwin Gaffley	TUT Vikings	1	0	0	0	5
45	Lukho Jongizulu	UFH Blues	1	0	0	0	5
45	Morné Joubert	UKZN Impi	1	0	0	0	5
45	Jaywinn Juries	UKZN Impi	1	0	0	0	5
45	Matthew le Roux	UWC	1	0	0	0	5
45	George Letshuma	TUT Vikings	1	0	0	0	5
45	Wayrin Losper	UWC	1	0	0	0	5
45	Kurt MacKay	TUT Vikings	1	0	0	0	5
45	Athenkosi Makeleni	UFH Blues	1	0	0	0	5
45	Aziyena Mandaba	UFH Blues	1	0	0	0	5
45	Ayebulela Mdudi	UFH Blues	1	0	0	0	5
45	John-Hubert Meyer	UKZN Impi	1	0	0	0	5
45	Michael Meyer	UKZN Impi	1	0	0	0	5
45	Blake Mingay	UKZN Impi	1	0	0	0	5
45	Dumisane Mthethwa	TUT Vikings	1	0	0	0	5
45	Minenhle Mthethwa	UWC	1	0	0	0	5
45	Sibongile Novuka	UFH Blues	1	0	0	0	5
45	Misugukhosi Pienaar	UFH Blues	1	0	0	0	5
45	Gordon-Wayne Plaatjies	UWC	1	0	0	0	5
45	Sesethu Time	UFH Blues	1	0	0	0	5
45	Brandon Valentyn	UWC	1	0	0	0	5
45	Tijde Visser	Wits	1	0	0	0	5
45	Ado Wessels	UKZN Impi	1	0	0	0	5
45	Zwela Zondi	UKZN Impi	1	0	0	0	5
78	Frank Abrahams	TUT Vikings	0	1	0	0	3
78	Spa Dube	UKZN Impi	0	1	0	0	3
78	Luxolo Ntsepe	Wits	0	1	0	0	3
78	AJ van Blerk	Wits	0	1	0	0	3
78	Melik Wana	UWC	0	1	0	0	3
—	penalty try	Wits	1	0	0	0	5
Note: Conversions count three points, while penalties and drop goals count two points. * Legend: T = Tries, C = Conversions, P = Penalties, DG = Drop Goals, Pts = Points.

=== Squads ===
The following squads were named for the 2016 Varsity Shield:

2016 TUT Vikings squad
Forwards	Francois de Villiers • Chestwin Gaffley • Dehan Groenewald • Jurie Huyser • Claude Johannes • Wessel Jordaan • Christo Lategan • George Letshuma • Calvin Maduna • Armand Marshall • Percy Matlhoko • Ratsaka Modjadji • DK Mukendi • Jacob Nelson • Kevin Nkateko • William Thomson • Schalk van Niekerk • Cornelius van Rooyen • Jonty Voogt • Did not play: • Erich Broodrijk • Gilbert Chalmers • Ian Ewart • James Frost • Jean-Claude le Roux • Albert Lubbe • Mandla Mdaka • Ryan Sim • Wian van Schalkwyk
Backs	Frank Abrahams • Lisa Banzi • Arno Brits • Mfundo Gumede • Shawn Jaards • Kurt MacKay • Dumisane Mthethwa • Tshepo Nyathi • Ian Truter • Lukas van Zyl • Litha Vumisa • Did not play: • Dalton Peter Dreyer • Cascious Andilj Dube • Runaldo Hendricks • Dikgang John Jabar • Melusi Meluleki Ndwandwe • Welcome Ngwenya • Ulikhaya Lavuya Nqoto • Bongani Phangisa • Gahno Bradley Calten Prins
Coach	Hennie Pieterse

2016 UFH Blues squad
Forwards	Justin Riaan Antonie • Asiphe Fanele • Lulamile Kama • Lwando Mabenge • Athenkosi Makeleni • Bulelani Mdodana • Olwethu Mputla • Philisani Ncoko • Lusindiso Nkomo • Lwando Nteta • Misugukhosi Pienaar • Siphesihle Punguzwa • Zanoxolo Qwele • Sibusiso Sityebi • Hendri Storm • Sesethu Time • Mzinga Vitsha • Malusi Vula • Did not play: • Sakhumzi Bobi • Daniel Caku-Caku • Tsepo Themba Gcanga • Siphelele Njobeni • Ntsika Nyalambisa • Ashley Prince
Backs	Luyolo Batshise • Siviwe Bisset • Asiphe Fihla • Lukho Jongizulu • Aziyena Mandaba • Qama Masiza • Akhona Matutu • Athiphila Mlotywa • Sibongile Novuka • Elandre Sias • Sethu Tom • Siphosethu Tsotsa • Siphuxolo Zaula • Did not play: • Curwin Jacobus • Geraldo Joseph • Ntsika Kula • Lee Mavuso • Patrick Mbangi • Lithabile Mgwadleka • Sithembiso Ngwenya • Sivakele Ulana
Coach	Lumumba Currie

2016 UKZN Impi squad
Forwards	Andrew Acton • Jean Droste • Erich Kankowski • Sanele Malwane • Jordan Martin • Khuthu Mchunu • John-Hubert Meyer • Michael Meyer • Ntando Mpofana • Clive Musasiwa • Kwezi Puza • Lindo Radebe • Christie van der Merwe • Pierre van der Walt • Kerron van Vuuren • Mikyle Webster • Ado Wessels • Zwela Zondi • Rikus Zwart • Did not play: • Siya Mhlongo
Backs	Wikus Badenhorst • Tristan Blewett • Curwin Bosch • Thobekani Buthelezi • Spa Dube • Morné Joubert • Jaywinn Juries • Marius Louw • Shayne Makombe • Blake Mingay • S'busiso Nkosi • Grant Rattray • Langelihle Shange • Tristan Tedder • Alwayno Visagie • Did not play: • Richard Bamber • Alrich Brown • Ilunga Mukendi • Michael Sibiya • Zweli Silaule • Sandile Zulu
Coach	Michael Horak

2016 UWC squad
Forwards	Tahriq Allan • Stuart Austin • Brandon Beukman • Alwyn Carstens • Kelvin de Bruyn • Sabelo Dlamini • Keenan Douw • Matthew Faught • Philbrey Joseph • José Julies • Matthew le Roux • Wayrin Losper • Darren Luiters • Jeremy Papier • Robin Paulse • Verno Treu • Brandon Valentyn • Peter Wanjiru • Did not play: • Axolile Apleni • Bradley Jumaats • Heynes Kotze • George Piet Taona Saungweme • Tiaan Smuts
Backs	Byron Burgess • Aidynn Cupido • Courtney Cupido • Clayton Daniels • Lubabalo Faleni • Dean Herbert • Darian Hock • Marcus Kleinbooi • Monre Lingeveldt • Jason Marcus • Jacquin Moses • Ruan Mostert • Minenhle Mthethwa • Matthew Nortjé • Gordon-Wayne Plaatjes • Yaasien Railoun • Octaven van Stade • Wilbré van Wyk • Melik Wana • Did not play: • Carlisle Castle • Niyaas Johnson • Rufus Witbooi
Coach	Chester Williams

2016 Wits squad
Forwards	Constant Beckerling • Conor Brockschmidt • CJ Conradie • Richard Crossman • Mitchell Fraser • Rhyno Herbst • Craig Hume • Graham Logan • Ruan Macdonald • Ayabulela Mdudi • Brandon Palmer • Luvuyo Pupuma • Tijde Visser • Ameer Williams • Did not play: • Justin Brandon • Jethi de Lange • CJ Greeff • Matthys Johannes Human • Pascal Snyman • JP Swart • Gihard Visagie
Backs	Sicelo Champion • Ruan Cloete • Wian Coetzee • Warren Gilbert • Josh Jarvis • Thato Marobela • Kwanele Ngema • Luxolo Ntsepe • AJ van Blerk • Kyle Wesemann • Wade Worthington • Did not play: • Paolo Andrews • Bin Kasende Kapepula • Divan Minnaar • Sibusiso Mngomezulu • Kyle Schachat • Dandré van den Berg
Coach	Hugo van As

=== Discipline ===
The following table contains all the cards handed out during the tournament:

Cards
Player	Team	Sent off (straight red)	Temporarily suspended
Zanoxolo Qwele	UFH Blues	1	2
Luyolo Batshise	UFH Blues	1	0
George Letshuma	TUT Vikings	0	2
Tahriq Allan	UWC	0	1
Justin Riaan Antonie	UFH Blues	0	1
Stuart Austin	UWC	0	1
Tristan Blewett	UKZN Impi	0	1
Conor Brockschmidt	Wits	0	1
Sicelo Champion	Wits	0	1
Sabelo Dlamini	UWC	0	1
Matthew Faught	UWC	0	1
Chestwin Gaffley	TUT Vikings	0	1
Rhyno Herbst	Wits	0	1
Craig Hume	Wits	0	1
Athiphila Mlotywa	UFH Blues	0	1
Dumisane Mthethwa	TUT Vikings	0	1
S'busiso Nkosi	UKZN Impi	0	1
Sibongile Novuka	UFH Blues	0	1
Tshepo Nyathi	TUT Vikings	0	1
Siphesihle Punguzwa	UFH Blues	0	1
Elandre Sias	UFH Blues	0	1
Sibusiso Sityebi	UFH Blues	0	1
Brandon Valentyn	UWC	0	1
Lukas van Zyl	TUT Vikings	0	1
* Legend: (red card) = Sent off, (yellow card) = Sin-binned

== Referees ==
The following referees officiated matches in the 2016 Varsity Shield:

- Rodney Boneparte
- Ben Crouse
- Stephan Geldenhuys
- AJ Jacobs
- Cwengile Jadezweni
- Pieter Maritz
- Mpho Matsaung
- Ruhan Meiring
- Paul Mente
- Vusi Msibi
- Sindile Ngcese
- Jaco Pretorius
- Oregopotse Rametsi
- Egon Seconds
- Ricus van der Hoven

== See also ==
- Varsity Cup
- 2016 Varsity Rugby
- 2016 Varsity Cup
- 2016 Gold Cup
