= 2016 Varsity Rugby =

2016 Varsity Rugby was the 2016 edition of four rugby union competitions annually played between several university teams in South Africa. It was contested from 1 February to 18 April 2016 and was the ninth edition of these competitions.

Following a disruption during the Varsity Cup Round Three match between UFS Shimlas and NMMU Madibaz and general unrest on various university campuses, all fixtures scheduled for 29 February were postponed to 4 April, with the semi-finals and final also postponed by a week. On 1 March, it was also announced that the round of matches scheduled for 7 March would be postponed, with the situation at various universities being monitored to determine when the competition will resume.

== Rules ==
All four 2016 Varsity Rugby competitions used a different scoring system to the regular system. In the Varsity Cup, tries could be worth five, seven or nine points, depending on the point of origin of the try. In the Varsity Shield, Young Guns and Koshuis Rugby Championship competitions, tries were worth five points as usual, but conversions were worth three points, while penalties and drop goals were only worth two points.

== Varsity Cup ==
The following teams competed in the 2016 Varsity Cup: CUT Ixias, Maties, NMMU Madibaz, NWU Pukke, UCT Ikey Tigers, UFS Shimlas, UJ and UP Tuks. All these teams also played in the competition in 2015. The tournament was won by NWU Pukke, who beat Maties 7–6 in the final. UCT Ikey Tigers finished bottom of the log, but beat 2016 Varsity Shield runner-up UWC in a relegation play-off to remain in the Varsity Cup for 2017.

== Varsity Shield ==
The following teams competed in the 2016 Varsity Shield: TUT Vikings, UFH Blues, UKZN Impi, UWC and Wits. The tournament was won by Wits, who beat UWC 39–2 in the final. Wits were automatically promoted to an expanded nine-team 2017 Varsity Cup, but runner-up UWC lost to UKZN Impi in a promotion play-off to remain in the Varsity Shield for 2017.

== Promotion/relegation play-offs ==
=== 2017 Varsity Cup play-off ===
There was a promotion/relegation match between UCT Ikey Tigers, who finished bottom team in the 2016 Varsity Cup and UKZN Impi, who finished as runners-up in the 2016 Varsity Shield. UCT Ikey Tigers won 40–5 to retain their place in the Varsity Cup for 2017, while UWC remained in the Varsity Shield competition.

11 April 2016	UCT Ikey Tigers	40–5	UWC	Danie Craven Stadium, Stellenbosch
14:00	Try: Alva Senderayi 15'; Keagan Timm 22'; Lihleli Xoli 27' (4BP); Dylan-Lee Tidbury 63'; Luke Stringer 73'; Robert Anderson 80'; Con: Tom Bednall 16', 23', 74' (3/5); Mark Prior (0/1); Pen: Tom Bednall (0/1)	Report; Scoreboard	Try: Lubabalo Faleni 40'; Con: Aidynn Cupido (0/1)	Referee: Rodney Boneparte

== Young Guns ==
=== Competition Rules ===
There were eight participating universities in the 2016 Young Guns competition. These teams were divided into two pools and each team played every team in the other pool once over the course of the season, either home or away.

Teams received four points for a win and two points for a draw. Bonus points were awarded to teams that scored four or more tries in a game, as well as to teams that lost a match by seven points or less. Teams were ranked by log points, then points difference (points scored less points conceded).

The top two teams overall qualified for the title play-off final.

=== Teams ===
2016 Young Guns teams
Team	University	Stadium
CUT Young Guns	Central Institute of Technology	CUT Stadium, Bloemfontein
Maties Juniors	Stellenbosch University	Danie Craven Stadium, Stellenbosch
NMMU Young Guns	Nelson Mandela Metropolitan University	NMMU Stadium, Port Elizabeth
NWU Pukke Young Guns	North-West University	Fanie du Toit Sport Ground, Potchefstroom
UCT Trojans	University of Cape Town	UCT Rugby Fields, Cape Town
UFS Shimlas Young Guns	University of the Free State	Shimla Park, Bloemfontein
UJ Young Guns	University of Johannesburg	UJ Stadium, Johannesburg
UP Tuks Young Guns	University of Pretoria	LC de Villiers Stadium, Pretoria

=== Standings ===
The final league standings for the 2016 Varsity Cup Young Guns were:

2016 Varsity Cup Young Guns log
Pos	Team	Pl	W	D	L	PF	PA	PD	TB	LB	Pts
1	UJ Young Guns	4	3	0	1	217	138	+79	4	1	17
2	UP Tuks Young Guns	4	3	1	0	106	53	+53	2	0	16
3	UFS Shimlas Young Guns	4	3	0	1	155	115	+40	3	1	16
4	Maties Juniors	4	2	1	1	152	135	+17	3	0	13
5	NMMU Young Guns	4	2	0	2	78	116	−38	1	0	9
6	UCT Trojans	4	1	1	2	153	105	−48	0	1	7
7	NWU Pukke Young Guns	4	0	1	3	94	130	−36	2	1	5
8	CUT Young Guns	4	0	0	4	54	217	−163	0	0	0
* Legend: Pos = Position, Pl = Played, W = Won, D = Drawn, L = Lost, PF = Points for, PA = Points against, PD = Points difference, TF = Tries for, TA = Tries against, TB = Try bonus points, LB = Losing bonus points, Pts = Log points The top two teams qualified to the final. Points breakdown: *4 points for a win *2 points for a draw *1 bonus point for a loss by eight points or less *1 bonus point for scoring four or more tries in a match

=== Matches ===
The following matches were played in the 2016 Varsity Young Guns:

==== Round one ====
15 February 2016	NMMU Young Guns	20–8	NWU Pukke Young Guns	NMMU Stadium, Port Elizabeth
14:15

15 February 2016	UP Tuks Young Guns	14–8	UFS Shimlas Young Guns	LC de Villiers Stadium, Pretoria
14:15		Report

Bye/s: CUT Young Guns, Maties Juniors, UCT Trojans, UJ Young Guns

==== Round two ====
22 February 2016	UCT Trojans	18–18	NWU Pukke Young Guns	UCT Rugby Fields, Cape Town
14:00

22 February 2016	Maties Juniors	21–21	UP Tuks Young Guns	Danie Craven Stadium, Stellenbosch
14:15

22 February 2016	UFS Shimlas Young Guns	57–20	CUT Young Guns	Shimla Park, Bloemfontein
16:15

Bye/s: NMMU Young Guns, UJ Young Guns

==== Round three ====
19 March 2016	UFS Shimlas Young Guns	53–50	UJ Young Guns	Rand Stadium, Johannesburg
14:00		Report

21 March 2016	UCT Trojans	24–39	UP Tuks Young Guns	Rand Stadium, Johannesburg
11:00		Report

Bye/s: CUT Young Guns, Maties Juniors, NMMU Young Guns, NWU Pukke Young Guns

==== Round four ====
24 March 2016	NWU Pukke Young Guns	31–37	UFS Shimlas Young Guns	Rand Stadium, Johannesburg
13:00		Report

24 March 2016	CUT Young Guns	18–42	NMMU Young Guns	Rand Stadium, Johannesburg
15:00		Report

24 March 2016	UJ Young Guns	69–32	Maties Juniors	Rand Stadium, Johannesburg
17:00		Report

Bye/s: UCT Trojans, UP Tuks Young Guns

==== Round five ====
26 March 2016	NWU Pukke Young Guns	37–55	Maties Juniors	Rand Stadium, Johannesburg
11:00

26 March 2016	NMMU Young Guns	16–58	UJ Young Guns	Rand Stadium, Johannesburg
13:00

26 March 2016	CUT Young Guns	8–74	UCT Trojans	Rand Stadium, Johannesburg
17:00

Bye/s: UFS Shimlas Young Guns, UP Tuks Young Guns

==== Round six ====
28 March 2016	Maties Juniors	44–8	CUT Young Guns	FNB Stadium, Johannesburg
9:00

28 March 2016	UJ Young Guns	40–37	UCT Trojans	Rand Stadium, Johannesburg
11:00		Report

28 March 2016	UP Tuks Young Guns	32–0 (w/o)	NMMU Young Guns	Rand Stadium, Johannesburg
9:00		Report

Bye/s: NWU Pukke Young Guns, UFS Shimlas Young Guns

==== Final ====
12 April 2016	UJ Young Guns	24–47	UP Tuks Young Guns	UJ Stadium, Johannesburg
16:00

== Koshuis Rugby Championship ==
=== Competition Rules ===
There were eight participating teams in the 2016 Koshuis Rugby Championship competition, the winners of the internal leagues of each of the eight Varsity Cup teams. These teams were divided into two pools and each team played every team in the other pool once over the course of the season, either home or away.

Teams received four points for a win and two points for a draw. Bonus points were awarded to teams that scored four or more tries in a game, as well as to teams that lost a match by seven points or less. Teams were ranked by log points, then points difference (points scored less points conceded).

The top two teams overall qualified for the title play-off final.

=== Teams ===
2016 Koshuis Rugby Championship teams
Team	University	Stadium
Dagbreek (SU)	Stellenbosch University	Danie Craven Stadium, Stellenbosch
Harlequins (NMMU)	Nelson Mandela Metropolitan University	NMMU Stadium, Port Elizabeth
Mopanie (UP)	University of Pretoria	LC de Villiers Stadium, Pretoria
Oppierif (UJ)	University of Johannesburg	UJ Stadium, Johannesburg
Patria (NWU)	North-West University	Fanie du Toit Sport Ground, Potchefstroom
Rhinos (CUT)	Central Institute of Technology	CUT Stadium, Bloemfontein
Tornadoes (UCT)	University of Cape Town	UCT Rugby Fields, Cape Town
Vishuis (UFS)	University of the Free State	Shimla Park, Bloemfontein

=== Standings ===
The final league standings for the 2016 Koshuis Rugby Championship were:

2016 Koshuis Rugby Championship log
Pos	Team	Pl	W	D	L	PF	PA	PD	TB	LB	Pts
1	Patria (NWU)	4	4	0	0	171	44	+127	4	0	20
2	Vishuis (UFS)	4	4	0	0	167	26	+141	3	0	19
3	Dagbreek (SU)	4	2	0	2	121	79	+42	2	1	11
4	Mopanie (UP)	4	2	0	2	103	135	−36	2	0	10
5	Rhinos (CUT)	4	1	0	3	83	125	−42	1	1	6
6	Oppierif (UJ)	4	1	0	3	73	149	−76	1	1	6
7	Tornadoes (UCT)	4	1	0	3	69	137	−68	0	0	4
8	Harlequins (NMMU)	4	1	0	3	35	127	−92	0	0	4
* Legend: Pos = Position, Pl = Played, W = Won, D = Drawn, L = Lost, PF = Points for, PA = Points against, PD = Points difference, TB = Try bonus points, LB = Losing bonus points, Pts = Log points The top two teams qualified to the final. Points breakdown: *4 points for a win *2 points for a draw *1 bonus point for a loss by seven points or less *1 bonus point for scoring four or more tries in a match

=== Matches ===
The following matches were played in the 2016 Koshuis Rugby Championship:

==== Round one ====
15 February 2016	Mopanie (UP)	42–30	Tornadoes (UCT)	LC de Villiers Stadium, Pretoria
16:15

15 February 2016	Patria (NWU)	50–18	Oppierif (UJ)	Fanie du Toit Sport Ground, Potchefstroom
16:45		Report

15 February 2016	Harlequins (NMMU)	20–18	Rhinos (CUT)	NMMU Stadium, Port Elizabeth
19:00

Bye/s: Dagbreek (SU), Vishuis (UFS)

==== Round two ====
22 February 2016	Tornadoes (UCT)	21–0	Harlequins (NMMU)	UCT Rugby Fields, Cape Town
16:15		Report

22 February 2016	Dagbreek (SU)	13–21	Vishuis (UFS)	Danie Craven Stadium, Stellenbosch
16:45		Report

22 February 2016	Oppierif (UJ)	21–23	Rhinos (CUT)	UJ Stadium, Johannesburg
19:00		Report

Bye/s: Mopanie (UP), Patria (NWU)

==== Round three ====
24 March 2016	Vishuis (UFS)	46–5	Harlequins (NMMU)	Rand Stadium, Johannesburg
9:00

24 March 2016	Patria (NWU)	42–8	Mopanie (UP)	Rand Stadium, Johannesburg
11:00

24 March 2016	Tornadoes (UCT)	13–34	Oppierif (UJ)	Rand Stadium, Johannesburg
19:00

Bye/s: Dagbreek (SU), Rhinos (CUT)

==== Round four ====
26 March 2016	Rhinos (CUT)	16–39	Dagbreek (SU)	Wanderers Rugby Club, Johannesburg
9:00

26 March 2016	Patria (NWU)	42–10	Harlequins (NMMU)	Wanderers Rugby Club, Johannesburg
11:00

26 March 2016	Mopanie (UP)	8–37	Vishuis (UFS)	Wanderers Rugby Club, Johannesburg
13:00

Bye/s: Oppierif (UJ), Tornadoes (UCT)

==== Round five ====
28 March 2016	Oppierif (UJ)	0–63	Vishuis (UFS)	FNB Stadium, Johannesburg
11:00

28 March 2016	Dagbreek (SU)	8–37	Patria (NWU)	Rand Stadium, Johannesburg
13:00

28 March 2016	Mopanie (UP)	45–26	Rhinos (CUT)	Rand Stadium, Johannesburg
15:00

Bye/s: Harlequins (NMMU), Tornadoes (UCT)

==== Round six ====
4 April 2016	Dagbreek (SU)	61–5	Tornadoes (UCT)	Danie Craven Stadium, Stellenbosch
16:30

Bye/s: Harlequins (NMMU), Mopanie (UP), Oppierif (UJ), Patria (NWU), Rhinos (CUT), Vishuis (UFS)

==== Final ====
18 April 2016	Patria (NWU)	29–37	Vishuis (UFS)	Danie Craven Stadium, Stellenbosch
16:45		Report

== See also ==
- Varsity Cup
- 2016 Varsity Cup
- 2016 Varsity Shield
- 2016 Gold Cup
