= Tristan Blewett =

South African rugby union player

- Full name: Tristan James Blewett
- Born: 26 August 1996 (age 30) Johannesburg, South Africa
- Height: 1.78 m (5 ft 10 in)
- Weight: 85 kg (13 st 5 lb; 187 lb)
- School: Hilton College, KwaZulu-Natal
- University: University of KwaZulu-Natal, University of Surrey

Rugby union career
- Position: Centre / Winger / Fullback
- Current team: none
Youth career
- 2012–2017: Sharks
Amateur team(s)
Years	Team	Apps	(Points)
2016	UKZN Impi	8	(35)
Senior career
Years	Team	Apps	(Points)
2016–2018	Sharks XV	13	(30)
2017	Sharks (Currie Cup)	6	(0)
2018	Eastern Province Kings	1	(5)
2018	Southern Kings	3	(0)
2018–2020	New Orleans Gold	12	(66)
- Correct as of 27 October 2018

Tristan James Blewett (born 26 August 1996) was a South African professional rugby union player for the New Orleans Gold in Major League Rugby in the United States. His regular position is centre, but he can also play as a winger or fullback.

== Early life and schoolboy rugby ==
Blewett was born in Johannesburg, but grew up in Pietermaritzburg in KwaZulu-Natal. He attended Hilton College, where he was included in various KwaZulu-Natal provincial teams. In 2012, he represented them at the Under-16 Grant Khomo Week in Johannesburg, starting all three matches in the inside centre position. He also started all three matches for a KwaZulu-Natal team that hosted the 2013 Under-18 Academy Week at Glenwood High School in Durban, and at the Under-18 Craven Week – South Africa's premier rugby union tournament at high school level – held in Middelburg in 2014.

== 2015–2018: Sharks ==
After school, Blewett joined the academy of KwaZulu-Natal's professional rugby team, the Sharks. He was included in the Sharks U19 squad that participated in the 2015 Under-19 Provincial Championship, and started each of their twelve matches in the competition. He scored tries in matches against Free State U19, Eastern Province U19 and Golden Lions U19 – in both their home and away clashes – before ending the season with two tries in their final match against Free State U19. Despite Blewett's six tries (and a single conversion for a season tally of 32 points), the Sharks endured a poor season, winning just one match and finishing bottom of the log.

Blewett started the 2016 by participating in the 2016 Varsity Shield for UKZN Impi. He featured in all eight of their matches, scoring seven tries; he scored one try in their opening round victory over Wits and one a fortnight later against UFH Blues before getting two tries in a 63–30 win over TUT Vikings in his fourth appearance. One try followed in a 16–44 defeat to UWC before another two-try haul in their 97–0 win over the UFH Blues. Blewett's total of seven tries was the second-most by any player in the competition, behind team-mate Thobekani Buthelezi, and helped UKZN Impi to second spot on the log. However, the Varsity Cup Executive Committee ruled that UKZN Impi fielded an ineligible player throughout the season and imposed a twelve points deduction, which cost UKZN Impi a place in the Varsity Shield final and a Varsity Cup promotion play-off against UCT Ikey Tigers.

After the Varsity Shield, Blewett linked up with the Sharks XV squad that participated in the 2016 Currie Cup qualification series. He made his first class debut on 23 April 2016, coming on as a replacement in their 48–18 victory over Namibian side the Welwitschias, and made a second appearance four weeks later in a 16–53 defeat to a Golden Lions XV. He spent the rest of the season playing in the 2016 Under-21 Provincial Championship for the Sharks U21 team, where he scored six tries in six appearances to end as the joint-top try scorer in the competition. He scored single tries in matches against Eastern Province U21 and Leopards U21 before scoring two tries against Blue Bulls U21 and Free State U21. The team finished in sixth spot to miss out on the title play-offs.

At the end of October 2016, Blewett was included in the Sharks Super Rugby squad for the 2017 season.

== 2018: Southern Kings ==
In September 2018, Blewett moved to Port Elizabeth to join the Southern Kings for a short stint during the 2018–19 Pro14 season, where he made two appearances, plus one appearance for the Eastern Province Elephants in the Currie Cup.

== 2018–2020: New Orleans Gold ==
Blewett moved to the United States to join Major League Rugby side New Orleans Gold on a two-year deal. Blewett returned to South Africa in 2020.

== 2021: Worthing Raiders ==
As of 2021, Blewett was playing for National League 2 South side Worthing Rugby Football Club
