= St Benedict's College, Bedfordview =

St Benedict's College

Location
- Harcus Road, Bedfordview; Germiston, Gauteng; South Africa

Information
- School type: All-boys private school
- Motto: Veritas in Caritate (Truth in Charity)
- Religious affiliation: Roman Catholic
- Established: 22 January 1958; 68 years ago
- Sister school: Assumption Convent School & Holy Rosary School for girls
- School number: 011 455 1906
- Headmaster: Mr Andre Oosthuysen
- Exam board: IEB
- Grades: Pre-Preparatory (00–3) Preparatory (4–7) College (8–12)
- Gender: Male
- Age: 14 to 18
- Enrollment: 1,400 boys
- Language: English
- Campus: Urban Campus
- Campus type: Suburban
- Houses: Allard; Erasme; Mazenod; O'Leary
- Colours: Red; Yellow; Blue; White
- Mascot: Raven
- Nickname: Bennies
- Rivals: Jeppe High School for Boys; Pretoria Boys High School; St. Alban's College; St. Dunstan's College (South Africa); St John's College, Johannesburg; St Stithians College
- Newspaper: The Grandest Magazine
- Yearbook: Published to school pupils on a yearly basis
- School fees: R210,000 (boarding); R116,000 (tuition)
- Alumni: They are referred to as Alumni or "Alumni" a famous old boy is Voiyo
- Website: www.stbenedicts.co.za

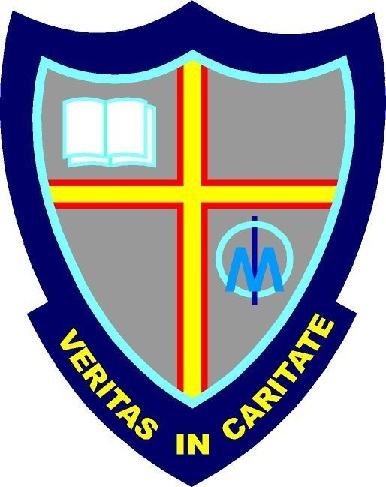
Badge of St Benedict's College

St Benedict's College is a private, day and boarding, English medium and Catholic school for boys in Bedfordview, Germiston in the Gauteng province of South Africa, The students write Independent Examination Board (IEB). The all boys high school was established in 1958.

== Sport ==
St Benedict's College has produced many athletes. Luther Obi played for the Blue Bulls in Currie Cup rugby competition in South Africa, and represented South Africa at Junior (U/20) international level. He matriculated in 2011. Vincent Breet has represented South Africa in Senior Rowing and also matriculated in 2011. Shingirai Hlanguyo and Mosolwa Mafuma have both won gold medals in 100m Athletics for St Benedicts, and also played first team rugby.

Mosolwa Mafuma also played for the Shimlas in the 2016 Varsity Cup Competition. He was the second highest try-scorer (7 tries), and was awarded the Player That Rocks (Player of The Tournament) award. He was also selected for the South Africa national under-20 rugby union team for the 2016 World U/20 Championship in England.

=== Summer sports ===
==== Rugby ====
Despite only having started rugby in 1998, St Benedicts finished their 2015 Season ranked 13 in the country. St Benedicts biggest rivals include St John's College, St Stithians College, Jeppe Boys, and Pretoria Boys High whom they beat them for the first time in 2015 in their history, 45–36. St Benedicts once again beat Pretoria Boys in 2016, winning 54–13. Several St Benedict's Boys have been chosen to be Craven Week representatives.

== Notable alumni ==
The final year at St Benedict's College are in alphabetical order.

- Mosolwa Mafuma (2011) – South African professional rugby player
- Vincent Breet (2011) – South African professional rower
- Luther Obi (2011) – South African professional rugby player.
