= Etienne Oosthuizen =

Etienne Oosthuizen may refer to:

- Etienne Oosthuizen (rugby union, born 1992), South African rugby union player
- Etienne Oosthuizen (rugby union, born 1994), South African rugby union player
