= Ruan Venter =

Ruan Venter may refer to:

- Ruan Venter (rugby union, born 1992), South African rugby union player
- Ruan Venter (rugby union, born 2002), South African international rugby union player
