= Mosolwa Mafuma =

South African rugby union player

- Full name: Mosolwa Mashudu Mafuma
- Born: 13 February 1996 (age 30) Germiston, South Africa
- Height: 1.83 m (6 ft 0 in)
- Weight: 89 kg (14 st 0 lb; 196 lb)
- School: St Benedict's College
- University: University of the Free State

Rugby union career
- Position: Winger
Youth career
- 2012: Golden Lions
Amateur team(s)
Years	Team	Apps	(Points)
2016	UFS Shimlas	6	(40 (Note: The SARU match report lists the name of the 34th minute try-scorer as Mosolwa Mafuma, while the Varsity Cup match report lists it as Pieter-Steyn de Wet in the report and scoreboard sections. The latter was assumed to be correct.))
Senior career
Years	Team	Apps	(Points)
2016	Free State XV	3	(15)
- Correct as of 20 July 2016
International career
Years	Team	Apps	(Points)
2016	South Africa Under-20	3	(5)
2018	South Africa Sevens	5	(5)
- Correct as of 14 November 2018

Mosolwa Mashudu Mafuma (born 13 February 1996) is a South African rugby union player. His usual playing position is on the wing.

== Rugby career ==
=== 2012: Schoolboy rugby ===
Mafuma was born in Germiston and attended St Benedict's College. In 2012, he was selected to represent the Golden Lions at the Under-16 Grant Khomo Week held in Johannesburg.

=== 2016: Varsity Cup / South Africa Under-20 / Free State XV ===
Mafuma didn't earn further provincial representations during his high school career and it wasn't until 2016 that he sprung to prominence in a national competition; he was included in the UFS Shimlas squad that participated in the 2016 Varsity Cup competition. In the team's first match, he scored a late try to help his side to a 23–17 victory over UCT Ikey Tigers and followed that up with another try in their next match against UP Tuks in a 47–46 victory. He continued his try-scoring run by scoring against NMMU Madibaz, CUT Ixias, UJ and Maties, a run which meant he scored in each of his six matches for Shimlas. He was an unused reserve in their final match against NWU Pukke. At the conclusion of the tournament, Mafuma was named the "Player That Rocks" for the competition.

He was invited to join a South Africa Under-20 training squad, also making the cut for a reduced provisional squad named a week later. In between training with the team, he also made two appearances for a Free State XV in the 2016 Currie Cup qualification series. He made his first class debut in their Round Three match against Western Province, immediately proving his worth at this level by scoring two tries for his side. It was not enough, however, as the team from Cape Town won the match 36–31. He also played off the bench in their match against a Golden Lions XV a fortnight later. On 10 May 2016, he was included in the final South Africa Under-20 squad for the 2016 World Rugby Under 20 Championship tournament held in Manchester, England. He started their opening match in Pool C of the tournament as South Africa came from behind to beat Japan 59–19, scoring South Africa's seventh try of the match. He also started their next pool match as South Africa were beaten 13–19 by Argentina. He wasn't in the squad for their final pool match, as South Africa bounced back to secure a 40-31 bonus-point victory over France to secure a semi-final place as the best runner-up in the competition. He was restored to the starting line-up for the semi-final, as South Africa faced three-time champions England. The hosts proving too strong for South Africa, knocking them out of the competition with a 39–17 victory. Mafuma didn't feature against Argentina in the third-place play-off match, as Argentina beat South Africa – as they did in the pool stages – convincingly winning 49–19 and in the process condemning South Africa to fourth place in the competition.

Upon his return to South Africa, Mafuma scored his third try of the Currie Cup qualification series in a 24–16 victory over the SWD Eagles and was included in the Free State Cheetahs squad for the 2016 Currie Cup Premier Division.

== Athletics ==
Mafuma also participated in athletics at high school level, taking part in the 100m and 200m sprint events. He ran the 100m in 10.80 second and the 200m in 21.90 seconds at the Under-18 South African Championships in Pretoria in 2013, the fourth-fastest 100m time and seventh-fastest 200m time of the season for his age group. He broke 100m records at Under-15 and Under-16 level and also took part in other events such as 100m hurdles and the high jump.
