= Jean Droste =

South African rugby union player (born 1994)

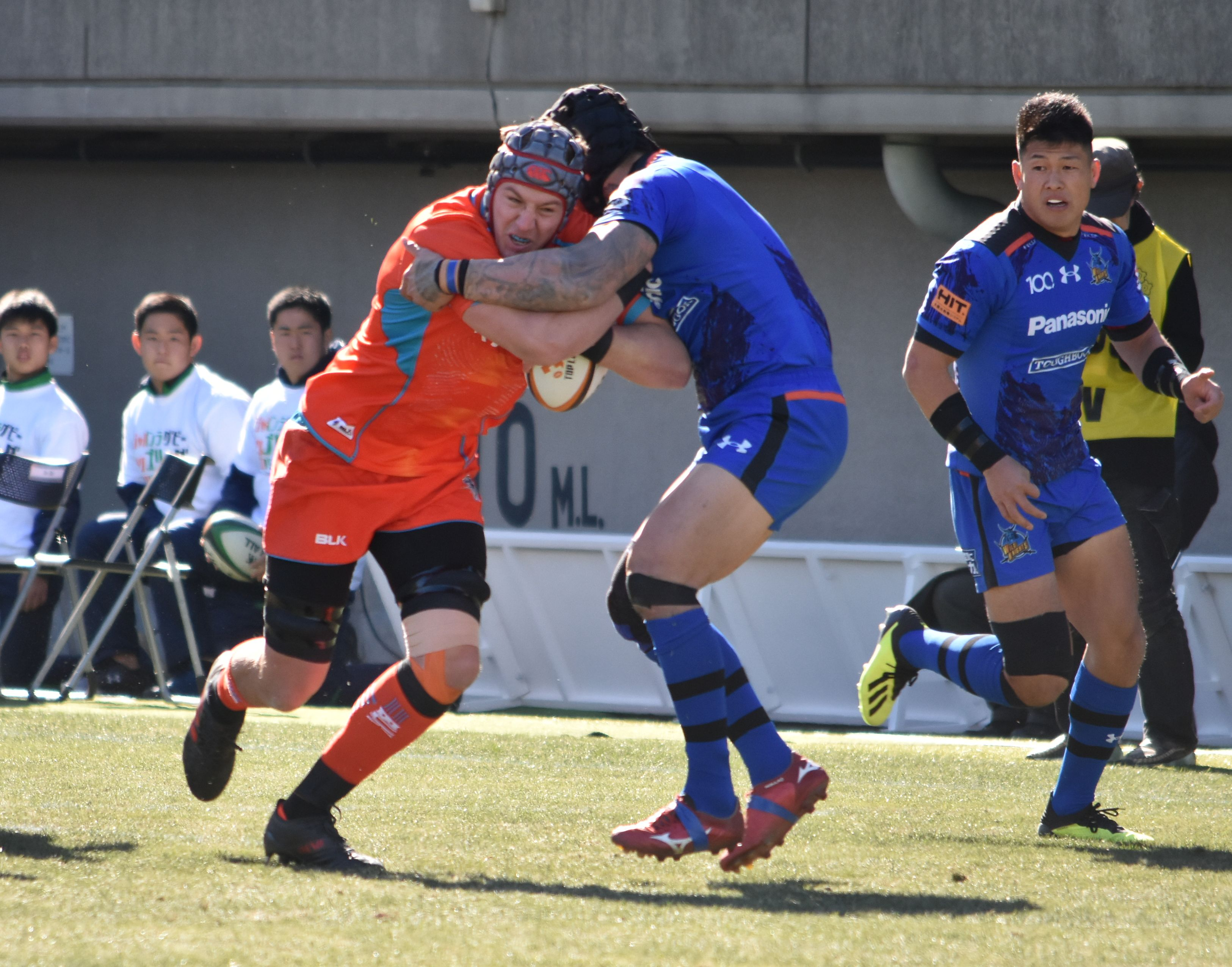
- Born: 21 January 1994 (age 32) Pretoria, South Africa
- Height: 1.99 m (6 ft 6 1/2 in)
- Weight: 111 kg (17 st 7 lb; 245 lb)
- School: Afrikaanse Hoër Seunskool
- University: University of KwaZulu-Natal

Rugby union career
- Position: Lock / Flanker
- Current team: Cheetahs / Free State Cheetahs
Youth career
- 2007–2014: Blue Bulls
- 2015: Sharks
Amateur team(s)
| Years | Team | Apps | (Points) |
| 2016 | UKZN Impi | 7 | (5) |
Senior career
| Years | Team | Apps | (Points) |
| 2015–2018 | Sharks XV | 14 | (0) |
| 2016–2017 | Sharks (Currie Cup) | 14 | (0) |
| 2017–2018 | Sharks | 3 | (0) |
| 2018–2019 | Kubota Spears | 4 | (0) |
| 2019 | Blue Bulls XV | 2 | (0) |
| 2019 | Blue Bulls | 3 | (0) |
| 2020 | NEC Green Rockets | 1 | (0) |
| 2021 | Free State Cheetahs | 7 | (0) |
| 2022 | Munakata Sanix Blues | 6 | (5) |
| 2022– | Cheetahs | | |
| 2023– | Free State Cheetahs | | |
- Correct as of 12 January 2022

Jean Droste (born 21 January 1994) is a South African professional rugby union player for the Blue Bulls in the Currie Cup and the Blue Bulls XV in the Rugby Challenge. His regular position is lock, but he can also play as a flanker.

== Rugby career ==
=== 2007–2014 : Youth rugby / Blue Bulls ===
Droste was born in Pretoria. He was selected to represent the Pretoria-based Blue Bulls as early as primary school level, when he played for them at the 2007 Under-13 Craven Week. He didn't win any call-ups at high school level, but joined the Blue Bulls academy after finishing school.

He made nine starts and two appearances as a replacement in the Blue Bulls U19s' Under-19 Provincial Championship campaign in 2013, appearing both as a lock and a flanker. He scored tries in home victories over Golden Lions U19 and Leopards U19 as the Blue Bulls won all twelve of their matches during the regular season to finish top of the log, before beating the Leopards in the semi-final and the Golden Lions in the final to secure the title.

He found his involvement more limited for the Blue Bulls U21s in the 2014 Under-21 Provincial Championship, making just one start and three appearances off the bench. One of those were in their 23–19 semi-final win over the Golden Lions U21s, but he didn't feature in the final, in which the Blue Bulls beat Western Province U21 20–10 in Cape Town.

=== 2015–present : Sharks and UKZN Impi ===
Droste moved to Durban for the 2015 to join the Sharks. He made his first class debut in May 2015, starting the Sharks XV's Vodacom Cup match against the Eastern Province Kings in Port Elizabeth, his only appearance in the competition.

He made seven appearances for the Sharks U21 in the 2015 Under-21 Provincial Championship, as the team finished in third place to qualify for the title play-offs, coming on as a replacement in their semi-final defeat to the Free State U21s.

At the start of 2016, Droste played some Varsity Shield rugby for UKZN Impi. He started seven of eight matches, scoring a try in a 63–30 victory over TUT Vikings. His team won seven of their eight matches and would have finished joint-top of the log with Wits, but they had 12 points deducted for fielding an ineligible player, therefore missing out on the title play-offs and a shot at promotion to the Varsity Cup.

He made three more first class appearances for the Sharks XV in July 2016 during the Currie Cup qualification series, as they finished in tenth place on the log. He was also included in the Sharks squad for the Currie Cup Premier Division, and he made his debut at that level in a 27–34 defeat to Western Province in Round Five of the competition. He was an unused replacement against the Free State Cheetahs, but made a second appearance in their 53–0 victory over the Eastern Province Kings. Despite being in the top two on the log for the majority of the series, a defeat to the Golden Lions in the final round of the season saw the Sharks drop out of the top four altogether, finishing in fifth place and missing out on a semi-final spot.

At the end of October 2016, Droste was included in the Sharks Super Rugby squad for the 2017 season.
