= Luther Obi =

Luther Banks Obi
- Full name: Luther Banks Olisa St Charles Obi
- Born: 29 April 1993 (age 33) Aba, Nigeria
- Height: 1.75 m (5 ft 9 in)
- Weight: 90 kg (14 st 2 lb; 198 lb)
- School: St Benedict's College
- University: University of South Africa (LLB)

Rugby union career
- Position: Winger
- Current team: Griquas
Youth career
- 2006–2009: Golden Lions
- 2012: Leopards
Amateur team(s)
| Years | Team | Apps | (Points) |
| 2013–2014 | NWU Pukke | 16 | (45) |
Senior career
| Years | Team | Apps | (Points) |
| 2013–2014 | Leopards | 23 | (90) |
| 2015 | Eastern Province Kings | 13 | (25) |
| 2016–2017 | Blue Bulls XV | 2 | (0) |
| 2017 | Free State XV | 7 | (25) |
| 2017–2018 | Cheetahs | 7 | (10) |
| 2017 | Free State Cheetahs | 3 | (5) |
| 2019–2021 | Pumas | 8 | (10) |
| 2022– | Griquas | 28 | (35) |
- Correct as of 10 July 2022
International career
| Years | Team | Apps | (Points) |
| 2013 | South Africa Under-20 | 5 | (20) |
- Correct as of 13 April 2018

Luther Banks St Charles Obi (born 29 April 1993) is a Nigerian-born South African professional rugby union player for the Griquas in the Currie Cup and the Rugby Challenge. His regular position is as a winger.

Aside from his rugby interests, the Winger holds a Law degree and exercises a strong interest in the Mining and Construction industry. He is the director of LUAAZ TRADING GROUP (PTY) LTD, a Deal Development Firm which specialises in Underground Infrastructure and Electrical Development.

Luther represented the Junior Springboks at the 2013 Junior Rugby World Championships; impressive performances saw the winger finish the Championships as the second leading try scorer.

Luther has attained his LLB Law Degree from The University of South Africa (UNISA); making him one of few professional rugby players with a higher qualification. Luther graduated in the summer of 2022. He has been quoted saying; “rugby is short, life is long.”

The Nigerian-born winger has been capped in: Super Rugby, Pro14, Currie Cup, Vodacom Cup, Supersport Challenge, and Varsity Cup.

== Career ==
=== Youth and Varsity rugby ===
As a student at St Benedict's College in Bedfordview, Obi represented the Golden Lions in youth competitions. He played for them at the 2006 Under-13 Craven Week competition and for their Under-16 side at the 2009 Grant Khomo Week.

Obi joined Potchefstroom-based side the Leopards in 2012 and represented the Leopards U19 side in the 2012 Under-19 Provincial Championship competition. He finished as the third-highest try scorer in that competition, scoring ten tries.

In 2013, he played Varsity Cup rugby for the NWU Pukke, scoring four tries for the side.

=== Leopards ===
Obi's first class debut came in the 2013 Currie Cup First Division competition. He missed out on the first game of the season, but started in their second match against the Falcons. He started each of the remaining matches of the season, making 14 appearances in total. His first senior try came in their match against the Griffons, scoring a dramatic try in injury time that secured a 34–28 victory for the Leopards. He was once again the match-winner against the Boland Cavaliers, with the second of his two tries coming with four minutes left to beat the Cavaliers 22–17. He scored another brace in their match against the Falcons to end the season with a tally of eight tries, joint-sixth in the competition.

Obi was subsequently included in the Lions wider training group prior to the 2014 Super Rugby season.

=== Eastern Province Kings ===
In February 2015, Obi – along with fellow Leopards winger Sylvian Mahuza – started training with Port Elizabeth-based side the Eastern Province Kings, following a dispute about the validity of their contracts with the Leopards. An agreement was reached and Obi officially joined the Kings on 27 February.

=== Bulls ===
After just one season at the Kings, Obi joined the Pretoria-based Bulls side for the 2016 Super Rugby season.

=== Cheetahs ===
He was on the move again in 2017, securing an early release from his Bulls contract to join the Cheetahs on a two-year deal.

=== Representative rugby ===
In 2013, he was included in the South Africa Under-20 side that competed at the 2013 IRB Junior World Championship. He scored four tries in his five appearances and finished joint-second in the try-scoring charts behind compatriot Seabelo Senatla, helping the S.A. Under-20 side to third place in the competition.
