= Conraad van Vuuren =

South African rugby union player (born 1995)

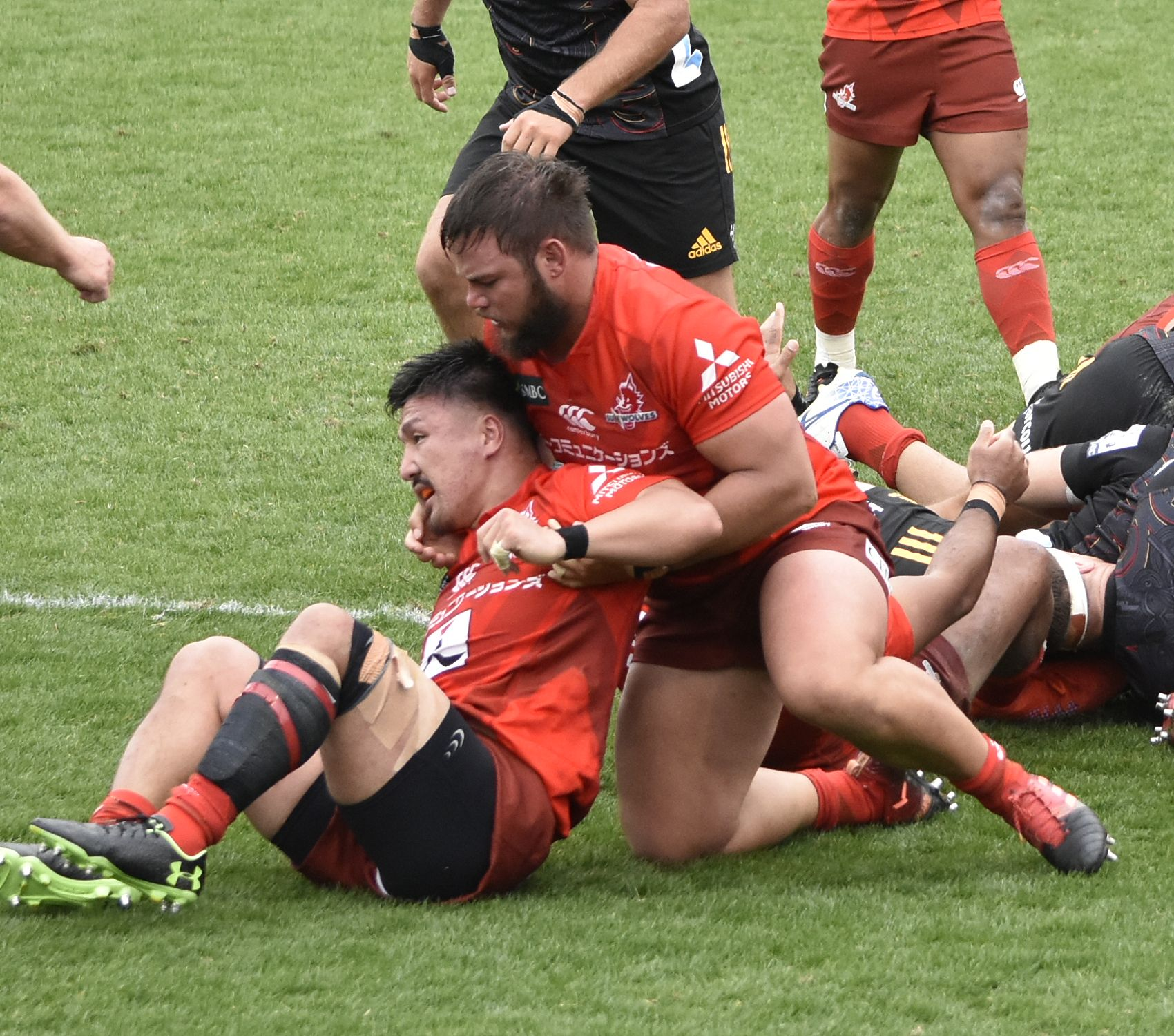
- Van Vuuren in 2020
- Full name: Jacobus Conradus van Vuuren
- Born: 4 September 1995 (age 31) Magaliesburg, South Africa
- Height: 1.83 m (6 ft 0 in)
- Weight: 110 kg (17 st 5 lb; 243 lb)
- School: Hoërskool Nelspruit
- University: University of the Free State

Rugby union career
- Position: Tighthead prop
- Current team: Cheetahs / Free State Cheetahs
Youth career
- 2008–2013: Pumas
- 2014–2016: Free State Cheetahs
Amateur team(s)
Years	Team	Apps	(Points)
2015–2016	UFS Shimlas	11	(19)
Senior career
Years	Team	Apps	(Points)
2016	Free State Cheetahs	2	(0)
2017–2019	Bulls	19	(5)
2017–2018	Blue Bulls XV	3	(0)
2017–2019	Blue Bulls	18	(5)
2020	Sunwolves	6	(0)
2020–	Cheetahs	0	(0)
2020–2023	Free State Cheetahs	19	(10)
2023–	Lions	31	(15)
2024–	Golden Lions	16	(5)
- Correct as of 3 November 2026
International career
Years	Team	Apps	(Points)
2013	South Africa Schools	2	(0)
- Correct as of 11 April 2018

Jacobus Conradus "Beertjie" van Vuuren (born 4 September 1995) is a South African professional rugby union player for the Bulls in Super Rugby, the Blue Bulls in the Currie Cup and the Blue Bulls XV in the Rugby Challenge. His regular position is tighthead prop.

== Rugby career ==
=== 2008–2013: Schoolboy rugby ===
Van Vuuren was born in Magaliesburg in Gauteng, but grew up in Mpumalanga province. He represented Mpumalanga's rugby team, the Pumas at several youth tournaments at schoolboy level – he played for them at the Under-13 Craven Week tournament in 2008, at the Under-16 Grant Khomo Week tournament in 2011 and at the premier high school rugby tournament in South Africa, the Under-18 Craven Week in 2013. He scored a try for the Pumas in the latter tournament, in a 24–40 defeat to Western Province in Polokwane. After the tournament, Van Vuuren was included in a South Africa Schools squad, and he made two appearances for them in the 2013 Under-18 International Series, coming on as a replacement in a 19–14 win over England and starting their 17–13 victory over France.

=== 2014–2016: Free State Cheetahs and UFS Shimlas ===
After high school, Van Vuuren moved to Bloemfontein, where he enrolled at the University of the Free State and joined the Free State Cheetahs academy. He made a single appearance for the Free State U19 team during the 2014 Under-19 Provincial Championship, coming on as a replacement in their match against Western Province U19.

Despite being limited to five appearances from the bench for UFS Shimlas in their first six matches of the 2015 Varsity Cup, Van Vuuren scored two tries – one on his debut in a 29–all draw against UP Tuks and another in a 24–0 win over UJ a week later. He was promoted to the starting line-up for their final match of the regular season against NWU Pukke, as UFS finished in second place on the log. He remained in the starting line-up for their 21–10 victory over defending champions UCT Ikey Tigers in the semi-final, and for the final, in which the Shimlas beat the NWU Pukke 63–33 to win the competition for the first time.

Van Vuuren was a regular for the Free State U21 team during the 2015 Under-21 Provincial Championship, appearing in thirteen of their fourteen matches, making five starts. He scored a try in their final match of the regular season, a 74–22 win over Sharks U21, to help his side to second on the log to qualify for the title play-offs. He came on as a replacement in their 27–22 win over the Sharks in the semi-finals and in the final, which his side lost 17–52 to Western Province U21.

Van Vuuren made three appearances off the bench in UFS Shimlas' 2016 Varsity Cup season, with a nine-point try in their Round Two match against UP Tuks proving decisive in a 47–46 win. It was a disappointing season for the defending champions, as they failed to qualify for the semi-finals, finishing in fifth place.

Despite not playing any more rugby in 2016, an injury to first-choice tighthead prop Tom Botha and Currie Cup regulations allowing eight players on the bench for the Currie Cup play-offs, Van Vuuren was named on the Free State Cheetahs' bench for their 2016 Currie Cup Premier Division semi-final match against the Golden Lions. Van Vuuren came on in the 62nd minute of the match to make his first class debut, helping his team to a 55–17 victory. He was also named on the bench for the final, and again finished on the winning side, with the Free State Cheetahs beating the Blue Bulls 36–16 to win the title for the fifth time in their history and the first time since 2007.

=== 2017–present: Bulls and Blue Bulls ===
Van Vuuren moved to Pretoria-based Bulls prior to the 2017 season on a two-year deal.
