= Sylvian Mahuza =

South African rugby union player

- Born: 29 July 1993 (age 33) George, South Africa
- Height: 1.78 m (5 ft 10 in)
- Weight: 80 kg (12 st 8 lb; 176 lb)
- School: Outeniqua High School, George
- University: North-West University

Rugby union career
- Position: Winger / Fullback / Centre
- Current team: Shizuoka Blue Revs
Youth career
- 2009–2011: SWD Eagles
- 2012–2013: Leopards
Amateur team(s)
Years	Team	Apps	(Points)
2013–14, 2016	NWU Pukke	23	(84)
Senior career
Years	Team	Apps	(Points)
2013–2014	Leopards	14	(75)
2015	Eastern Province Kings	7	(10)
2016–2019	Golden Lions XV	8	(26)
2016–2019	Lions	37	(65)
2016–2018	Golden Lions	21	(50)
2020–2023	NTT Shining Arcs	14	(10)
2023–	Shizuoka Blue Revs	37	(35)
- Correct as of 21 February 2021
International career
Years	Team	Apps	(Points)
2013	South Africa Under-20	1	(5)
- Correct as of 21 May 2018

Sylvian Mahuza (born 29 July 1993) is a South African professional rugby union player. He can play as a winger, centre or fullback.

== Career ==
=== Youth and Varsity Cup rugby ===
In 2009, he was called up to represent the SWD Eagles Under-16 side at the Grant Khomo Week competition. In 2010 and 2011, he played for their Under-18 side at the Craven Week tournament.

After high school in 2012, however, he moved to Potchefstroom, where he got involved in the youth setup of the provincial side, the Leopards, as well as playing rugby for Varsity Cup side NWU Pukke.

Mahuza made eleven appearances in the Leopards U19 team during the 2012 Under-19 Provincial Championship season, scoring three tries. In 2013, he played four matches in the 2013 Under-21 Provincial Championship, which included a match against Border U21 in which he scored two tries.

In the Varsity Cup competition, he played six matches for the NWU Pukke during the 2013 Varsity Cup competition, scoring two tries. He made eight appearances during the 2014 edition of the competition and ran in six tries (making him the second top try scorer in the competition) as the NWU Pukke reached the final.

=== South Africa Under-20 ===
Mahuza was also included in the South Africa Under-20 side that played against their Argentinean counterparts prior to the 2013 IRB Junior World Championship, but failed to make the final squad for the tournament.

=== Leopards ===
Mahuza's first involvement in first team action came during the 2013 Currie Cup First Division season. He made his debut against the Falcons, playing off the bench and scoring his first try within ten minutes of appearing. He made two further substitute appearances against the Eastern Province Kings and Pumas.

Mahuza's next taste of first class action came during the 2014 Currie Cup qualification tournament. He started in five of their matches during the competition. Prior to the last round of matches, he was the joint-top try scorer in the league, with a brace of tries against the Griffons and the SWD Eagles and one each against Griquas and Boland Cavaliers putting him on a total of six tries. In their last match of the competition against the Border Bulldogs, Mahuza and teammate Luther Obi, who was also on six tries for the season before the match – scored four tries each to help the Leopards to a 103–15 victory, which also meant that Mahuza and Obi finished the competition as joint-top try scorers, with ten tries apiece.

=== Eastern Province Kings ===
In February 2015, Mahuza – along with fellow Leopards winger Luther Obi – started training with Port Elizabeth-based side the Eastern Province Kings, following a dispute about the validity of their contracts with the Leopards. An agreement was reached and Mahuza officially joined the Kings on 27 February. He made his debut for the EP Kings by starting their first match of the 2015 Vodacom Cup season, a 19–27 defeat to defending champions Griquas. After just one season at the Kings, Mahuza left prior to the 2016 Super Rugby season.
