= Chase Morison =

South African rugby union player

- Full name: Chase Wayne Morison
- Born: 27 November 1992 (age 33) Germiston, South Africa
- Height: 1.80 m (5 ft 11 in)
- Weight: 110 kg (17 st 5 lb; 243 lb)
- School: Selborne College, East London
- University: University of the Free State

Rugby union career
- Position: Prop / Hooker
- Current team: Munakata Sanix Blues
Youth career
- 2008–2010: Border Bulldogs
- 2011–2013: Free State Cheetahs
Amateur team(s)
| Years | Team | Apps | (Points) |
| 2015–2016 | UFS Shimlas | 12 | (7) |
Senior career
| Years | Team | Apps | (Points) |
| 2014–2016 | Free State XV | 13 | (0) |
| 2015 | → Griffons | 2 | (0) |
| 2015 | Free State Cheetahs | 2 | (0) |
| 2016 | → Griquas | 1 | (0) |
| 2018–present | Munakata Sanix Blues | 0 | (0) |
- Correct as of 2 February 2019

Chase Wayne Morison (born 27 November 1992) was a South African professional rugby union player for Toyota Cheetahs in the Currie Cup in South Africa. His can play as a prop or a hooker.

== Career ==
=== Border ===
Morison was born in Germiston, but grew up in East London, where he qualified to represent the Border Bulldogs at provincial level; he played for them at Under-16 level at the Grant Khomo Week tournament in 2008 and at Under-18 level in the Craven Week tournament in 2010.

=== Free State / UFS Shimlas / Griffons ===
After high school, Morison moved to Bloemfontein, where he joined the Free State Cheetahs academy. In 2011, he played for the Free State U19 side in the 2011 Under-19 Provincial Championship and was named in the matchday squad for all thirteen of their matches, starting seven and playing off the bench on five occasions. Free State finished the regular season fourth on the log and qualified for the semi-finals, where they lost to the Blue Bulls U19s.

Morison was named in the Free State U21 squad, but did not get any game time despite being named on the bench for their match against Sharks U21 in the 2012 Under-21 Provincial Championship. However, he featured prominently in the same competition in 2013, starting ten of their matches as the Free State Under-21s finished in fifth spot, missing out on the semi-finals.

The following season, Morison was named in a first class squad for the first time for the Free State XV in the 2014 Vodacom Cup competition. He made his senior debut in their 52–47 victory over the SWD Eagles, coming on as a second-half replacement. He made further appearances off the bench in their matches against the Boland Cavaliers, Sharks XV and Kenyan invitational side Simba XV. The Free State XV finished in second spot on the Southern Section log and qualified for a quarter final match against the Blue Bulls, which they lost 21–22.

At the start of the 2015 season, Morison represented the UFS Shimlas in the 2015 Varsity Cup competition. He played in all seven of their matches during the regular season, helping them to maintain an unbeaten record, winning six matches and drawing one. He missed out on the play-offs, where his side won the competition for the first time after beating NWU Pukke 63–33 in Bloemfontein.

Morison joined Welkom-based side the Griffons during their 2015 Currie Cup qualification campaign and made appearances as a replacement in their matches against the Border Bulldogs and the Falcons.

Morison returned to Bloemfontein and was named in the Free State Cheetahs squad for the 2015 Currie Cup Premier Division. He was an unused replacement in their 31–73 defeat to the Golden Lions, but made his debut in the Premier Division of the Currie Cup the following week, playing off the bench in a 37-all draw against the Pumas in Nelspruit.
