= Etienne Oosthuizen (rugby union, born 1994) =

South African rugby union player

- Full name: Johan Etienne Oosthuizen
- Born: 20 July 1994 (age 32) Johannesburg, South Africa
- Height: 1.98 m (6 ft 6 in)
- Weight: 112 kg (247 lb; 17 st 9 lb)
- School: Hoërskool Kempton Park
- University: University of Johannesburg

Rugby union career
- Position: Flanker / Lock
- Current team: SWD Eagles
Youth career
- 2012: Falcons
- 2013: Golden Lions
Amateur team(s)
Years	Team	Apps	(Points)
2015–2016	UJ	12	(5)
2017	Pirates	0	(0)
Senior career
Years	Team	Apps	(Points)
2016	Eastern Province Kings	7	(10)
2018	Leopards	1	(0)
2019–present	SWD Eagles	12	(10)
- Correct as of 25 August 2019

Johan Etienne Oosthuizen (born 20 July 1994) is a South African rugby union player for the SWD Eagles in the Currie Cup and the Rugby Challenge. He can play as a lock or a flanker.

== Rugby career ==
=== Youth and Varsity Cup rugby ===
Oosthuizen was born in Johannesburg. He attended Hoërskool Kempton Park and was called up to represent the Falcons at the 2012 Under-18 Craven Week tournament held in Port Elizabeth. He made three appearances and scored tries against hosts Eastern Province and the Leopards.

He was named in the Golden Lions U19 squad that participated in the 2013 Under-19 Provincial Championship, as well as the Golden Lions XV squad for the 2014 Vodacom Cup, but failed to make any appearances in either competition.

He played rugby for university side UJ, and was included in their Varsity Cup squad for the 2015 and 2016 events. He made four appearances as a replacement in the 2015 event, but was more frequently used in the 2016 season, making five starts and three appearances as a replacement. He also scored a try in their 42–16 victory over Maties in a run that saw them reach the semi-finals for the first time in three seasons.

=== Eastern Province Kings ===
Oosthuizen was included in the Eastern Province Kings squad for the 2016 Currie Cup Premier Division, and named on the bench for their second match of the competition against the Blue Bulls in Pretoria. He made his first class debut during the match, coming on for three separate spells during the match; he came on as a temporary blood replacement for both Sebastian Ferreira and Tazz Fuzani in the first half before coming on as a tactical substitution for the final eight minutes.

=== Pirates ===
Oosthuizen joined Golden Lions Grand Challenge side Pirates prior to the 2017 season.
