= Rhyno Herbst =

South African rugby union player

- Born: 5 July 1996 (age 30) Roodepoort, South Africa
- Height: 1.98 m (6 ft 6 in)
- Weight: 120 kg (260 lb; 18 st 13 lb)
- School: Hoërskool Monument
- University: University of the Witwatersrand

Rugby union career
- Position: Lock
- Current team: Lions / Golden Lions / Golden Lions XV
Youth career
- 2012–2017: Golden Lions
Senior career
Years	Team	Apps	(Points)
2017–2018	Golden Lions XV	14	(5)
2017–2020	Golden Lions	20	(5)
2019–2020	Lions	9	(5)
2020–	Seattle Seawolves	29	(20)
- Correct as of 19 June 2022

Rhyno Herbst (born 5 July 1996) is a South African rugby union player for the Seattle Seawolves of Major League Rugby (MLR).

He previously played the Lions in Super Rugby, the Golden Lions in the Currie Cup and the Golden Lions XV in the Rugby Challenge. His regular position is lock.
