= Fred Eksteen =

South African rugby union player

- Full name: Frederik Ryk Ludolf Eksteen
- Born: 3 March 1991 (age 35) Nelspruit, South Africa
- Height: 1.87 m (6 ft 1 1/2 in)
- Weight: 107 kg (236 lb)
- School: Hoërskool Nelspruit
- University: University of Pretoria

Rugby union career
- Position: Flanker
- Current team: Griquas
Senior career
Years	Team	Apps	(Points)
2011	SWD Eagles	9	(0)
2012	Falcons	2	(5)
2019	Blue Bulls XV	2	(0)
2019	Blue Bulls	1	(0)
2020–	Griquas	0	(0)
- Correct as of 3 March 2021

Frederik Ryk Ludolf Eksteen (born 3 March 1991) is a South African rugby union player for the Blue Bulls in the Currie Cup and the Blue Bulls XV in the Rugby Challenge. His regular position is flanker.

He made his Currie Cup debut for the Blue Bulls in August 2019, starting their match against the Golden Lions in Round Five of the 2019 season.
