= Rand Stadium =

Stadium in Johannesburg, South Africa

- Interactive map of Rand Stadium
- Location: Rosettenville, Johannesburg, South Africa
- Coordinates: 26.2346°S 28.0516°E
- Owner: City of Johannesburg
- Operator: Stadium Management SA (SMSA)
- Capacity: 30,000
- Surface: Grass

Construction
- Opened: 1951
- Renovated: 1965, 2009
- Cost: R76 million (2009 refurbishment)

The Rand Stadium is a stadium in Rosettenville, a suburb of Johannesburg, South Africa. It was completely rebuilt, to FIFA specifications, and reopened in August 2008, set to be utilized as a training field for teams participating in the 2010 FIFA World Cup. Despite the relatively small capacity, it is regarded as one of the best playing surfaces in the country.

== History ==
Rand Stadium was constructed between 1949 and 1951 at a cost of £60,000 with a capacity of 15,000. Over time extensive renovations have been carried out, the first between 1964 and 1965 in which facilities were added and the second in 1976 that saw the installation of floodlighting. The stadium was adjudged to need serious improvements and it was decided that it would be demolished in 2006. The new Rand Stadium, managed by Stadium Management South Africa (SMSA), was rebuilt as an all-seater stadium and retained its old scoreboard for heritage purposes.

The original capacity at Rand Stadium was 15,000 but a 2009 revamp in preparation for the 2010 FIFA World Cup saw that capacity be extended to accommodate a maximum of 30,000 fans. The refurbishment includes a roof that covers up to 3,000 fans. Even though Rand Stadium has a new-look with an all-seater stadium, the old scoreboard has been retained for heritage.

== Football ==
=== Domestic ===
There has been a number of cup finals at the venue, including the Kaizer Chiefs versus Hellenic Champion of Champions final in 1975 and the Wits University (now Bidvest Wits) winning the 1978 Mainstay Cup final against Kaizer Chiefs in the old National Professional Soccer League (NPSL), which was preceded by the National Football League (NFL). It was home to the original incarnation of local team Highlands Park. During the 2010–11 season it was home to local PSL team Kaizer Chiefs. but infrastructure issues and low attendance rates prompted them to move to the FNB Stadium.It is currently the training venue for arch-rivals Orlando Pirates.

After it was temporarily closed down for renovations and revamped, Rand Stadium hosted the 2009 Nedbank Cup final between Moroka Swallows and the University of Pretoria.

=== International ===
The South Africa national football team (Bafana Bafana) use Rand Stadium as a training ground. The stadium has hosted two international fixtures. an African Cup of Nations qualifier against Mauritius in April 1993 which finished in a goalless draw. The ground hosted the second ever Bafana match when they hosted Angola in the 2016 African Nations Championship qualifier in October 2015.

== Other events ==
Rand Stadium has also hosted a number of high-profile boxing events, including the Arnold Taylor versus Romeo Anaya fight in 1973 as well as the Johnny du Plooy and Mike Weaver bout in 1987.

== See also ==
- Lists of stadiums
