= Luke Stringer =

South African Rugby player (born 1995)

- Full name: Luke Joseph Stringer
- Born: 12 December 1995 (age 30) Cape Town, South Africa
- Height: 1.92 m (6 ft 3 1/2 in)
- Weight: 103 kg (227 lb; 16 st 3 lb)
- School: Rondebosch Boys' High School
- University: University of Cape Town

Rugby union career
- Position: Flank / Eighth man
- Current team: Sharks / Sharks (Currie Cup) / Sharks XV
Youth career
- 2013–2016: Western Province
Senior career
Years	Team	Apps	(Points)
2016–2018	Western Province	32	(30)
2018–2020	Sharks	10	(5)
2019–2020	Sharks	8	(0)
2019–2020	Sharks XV	3	(0)
2020-2022	US Montauban		
2022-present	SC Albi		
- Correct as of 3 September 2019

Luke Joseph Stringer (born 12 December 1995) is a South African rugby union player for SC Albi in the Narionale League in France. His regular position is flank or eighth man.
