= Ruan Venter (rugby union, born 1992) =

South African rugby union player

- Full name: Ruan Christov Venter
- Born: 11 May 1992 (age 34) Rustenburg, South Africa
- Height: 1.98 m (6 ft 6 in)
- Weight: 120 kg (18 st 13 lb; 265 lb)
- School: [Paarl Boys’ High]

Rugby union career
- Position: Lock
Youth career
- 2005: Leopards
- 2009–2013: Golden Lions
Amateur team(s)
Years	Team	Apps	(Points)
2015–2017	NWU Pukke	14	(0)
Senior career
Years	Team	Apps	(Points)
2013	Golden Lions	8	(0)
2014	Golden Lions XV	12	(0)
2014	→ Pumas	12	(0)
2014–2017	Leopards	24	(0)
- Correct as of 24 May 2018
International career
Years	Team	Apps	(Points)
2010	South Africa Schools		
2011	South Africa Under-20	6	(0)
- Correct as of 23 April 2014

Ruan Christov Venter (born 11 May 1992) is a South African professional rugby union player who most recently played with the Leopards. His regular position is lock.

== Career ==
=== Youth ===
As a scholar at Laerskool Vastrap in Rustenburg, Venter represented local side Leopards at the 2005 Under-13 Craven Week tournament. He then went to Monument High School in Krugersdorp, where he represented the Golden Lions at the Under-18 Craven Week tournaments in 2009 and 2010. He was also included in the South African Under-18 High Performance Squad in 2010. Towards the end of 2010, he was also part of the Golden Lions U19 squad that played in the 2010 Under-19 Provincial Championship competition.

In 2011, he was included in the South Africa Under-20 team that played at the 2011 IRB Junior World Championship in Italy. After being an unused substitute in their opening match of the tournament against Scotland, Venter started their next two matches against Ireland and England. However, a knee injury ruled him out of the remainder of the tournament.

He only returned to action in late 2012, when he represented the Golden Lions U21 side in the 2012 Under-21 Provincial Championship competition and also played in the same competition in 2013.

=== Golden Lions ===
Despite being included in the Golden Lions' Vodacom Cup squads in 2011, 2012 and 2013, his first class debut came during the 2013 Currie Cup Premier Division, starting in the Golden Lions' matches against Griquas and the Free State Cheetahs.

He made his first appearance in the Vodacom Cup in the 2014 season, starting their match against the Leopards.

=== Pumas ===
He joined Nelspruit-based side the Pumas on loan during the 2014 Vodacom Cup competition.
