= List of 2020–21 Super Rugby transfers (South Africa) =

This is a list of player movements for Super Rugby teams prior to the end of the 2021 Super Rugby season. Departure and arrivals of all players that were included in a Super Rugby squad for 2020 or 2021 are listed here, regardless of when it occurred. Future-dated transfers are only included if confirmed by the player or his agent, his former team or his new team.

Notes

- 2020 players listed are all players that were named in the initial senior squad, or subsequently included in a 23-man match day squad at any game during the season.
- (did not play) denotes that a player did not play at all during one of the two seasons due to injury or non-selection. These players are included to indicate they were contracted to the team. For the 2020 season, Super Rugby was suspended after 7 rounds of matches due to the COVID-19 pandemic, with regional tournaments taking place there after. Players listed as 'did not play' did not feature in any of the 7 rounds of matches played that season.
- (short-term) denotes that a player wasn't initially contracted, but came in during the season. This could either be a club rugby player coming in as injury cover, or a player whose contract had expired at another team (typically in the northern hemisphere).
- Flags are only shown for players moving to or from another country.
- Players may play in several positions, but are listed in only one.

== Bulls ==
In September 2020, SA Rugby confirmed that all South African sides would withdraw from Super Rugby, and look to join an expanded version of the Pro14. All players listed remained contracted to the Bulls for the Pro14 Rainbow Cup SA unless stated.

Bulls transfers 2020–2021
Pos	2020 squad	Out	In	2021 players
PR	Lizo Gqoboka; Wiehahn Herbst; Simphiwe Matanzima; Trevor Nyakane; Gerhard Steenekamp; Dayan van der Westhuizen (did not play)	(substituted off) Wiehahn Herbst (to Lions); (substituted off) Dayan van der Westhuizen (to (Japan) Hino Red Dolphins)	—N/a	—N/a
HK	Corniel Els; Johan Grobbelaar; Louis van der Westhuizen (did not play); Jaco Visagie	(substituted off) Corniel Els (to (Italy) Benetton); (substituted off) Louis van der Westhuizen (to Cheetahs); (substituted off) Jaco Visagie (to Lions)	—N/a	—N/a
LK	Andries Ferreira; Ian Groenewald; Juandré Kruger; Ruan Nortjé; Ryno Pieterse	(substituted off) Andries Ferreira (to (Scotland) Edinburgh); (substituted off) Ian Groenewald (to Cheetahs); (substituted off) Juandré Kruger (released); (substituted off) Ryno Pieterse (to (France) Castres)	—N/a	—N/a
FL	Tim Agaba (did not play); Abongile Nonkontwana; Ruan Steenkamp; Josh Strauss; Muller Uys; Marco van Staden; Wian Vosloo	(substituted off) Abongile Nonkontwana (to (England) Ealing Trailfinders); (substituted off) Ruan Steenkamp (to Griquas); (substituted off) Josh Strauss (to (France) Oyonnax); (substituted off) Wian Vosloo (to (France) Suresnes)	—N/a	—N/a
N8	Jeandré Rudolph	(substituted off) Jeandré Rudolph (to Cheetahs)	—N/a	—N/a
SH	Marco Jansen van Vuren; Embrose Papier; Ivan van Zyl		—N/a	—N/a
FH	Manie Libbok; Chris Smith (did not play); Morné Steyn	(substituted off) Manie Libbok (to Sharks)	—N/a	—N/a
CE	Franco Naudé (did not play); Burger Odendaal; Marnus Potgieter (did not play); Dylan Sage (did not play); Nafi Tuitavake	(substituted off) Franco Naudé (to (Russia) Strela); (substituted off) Burger Odendaal (to Lions); (substituted off) Dylan Sage (to (France) Montauban); (substituted off) Nafi Tuitavake (released)	—N/a	—N/a
WG	Cornal Hendricks; Johnny Kôtze; Rosko Specman; Jade Stighling (did not play)	(substituted off) Johnny Kôtze (to (Japan) Shimizu Blue Sharks); (substituted off) Rosko Specman (to Cheetahs); (substituted off) Jade Stighling (to Blue Bulls)	—N/a	—N/a
FB	Warrick Gelant; Richard Kriel (did not play); Divan Rossouw	(substituted off) Warrick Gelant (to Stormers); (substituted off) Divan Rossouw (to Lions)	—N/a	—N/a
Coach	Pote Human	(substituted off) Pote Human (to Shimlas)	—N/a	—N/a

== Lions ==
In September 2020, SA Rugby confirmed that all South African sides would withdraw from Super Rugby, and look to join an expanded version of the Pro14. All players listed remained contracted to the Lions for the Pro14 Rainbow Cup SA unless stated.

Lions transfers 2020–2021
Pos	2020 squad	Out	In	2021 players
PR	Jannie du Plessis; Johannes Jonker (did not play); Nathan McBeth (did not play); Asenathi Ntlabakanye (did not play); Carlü Sadie; Sti Sithole; Dylan Smith; Frans van Wyk	(substituted off) Johannes Jonker (to (England) Ealing Trailfinders); (substituted off) Dylan Smith (to (France) Stade Français); (substituted off) Frans van Wyk (to (France) Oyonnax)	—N/a	—N/a
HK	Jan-Henning Campher; Marko Janse van Rensburg (did not play); Pieter Jansen	(substituted off) Marko Janse van Rensburg (to Pumas); (substituted off) Pieter Jansen (to (United States) New England Free Jacks)	—N/a	—N/a
LK	Rhyno Herbst (did not play); Reinhard Nothnagel (did not play); Marvin Orie; Ruben Schoeman; Wilhelm van der Sluys; Ruan Vermaak	(substituted off) Rhyno Herbst (to (United States) Seattle Seawolves); (substituted off) Marvin Orie (to Stormers); (substituted off) Ruan Vermaak (to (Japan) NTT Red Hurricanes)	—N/a	—N/a
FL	Willem Alberts; Cyle Brink (did not play); Hacjivah Dayimani; Jaco Kriel (did not play); Marnus Schoeman; Roelof Smit (did not play); Vincent Tshituka	(substituted off) Cyle Brink (to (England) Leicester Tigers)	—N/a	—N/a
N8	Len Massyn		—N/a	—N/a
SH	Ross Cronjé (did not play); Dillon Smit; Morné van den Berg (short-term); André Warner		—N/a	—N/a
FH	Elton Jantjies; James Mollentze (did not play); Shaun Reynolds; Tiaan Swanepoel	(substituted off) Elton Jantjies (to (France) Pau); (substituted off) Shaun Reynolds (to (France) Nevers)	—N/a	—N/a
CE	Dan Kriel; Duncan Matthews; Mannie Rass; Wandisile Simelane; Louritz van der Schyff (did not play)	(substituted off) Duncan Matthews (released); (substituted off) Louritz van der Schyff (to Blue Bulls U21)	—N/a	—N/a
WG	Tyrone Green; Stean Pienaar (did not play); Courtnall Skosan; Jamba Ulengo	(substituted off) Tyrone Green (to (England) Harlequins)	—N/a	—N/a
FB	Andries Coetzee; Gianni Lombard (did not play)	(substituted off) Andries Coetzee (to (Japan) Kintetsu Liners)	—N/a	—N/a
Coach	Ivan van Rooyen		—N/a	—N/a

== Sharks ==
In September 2020, SA Rugby confirmed that all South African sides would withdraw from Super Rugby, and look to join an expanded version of the Pro14. All players listed remained contracted to the Sharks for the Pro14 Rainbow Cup SA unless stated.

Sharks transfers 2020–2021
Pos	2020 squad	Out	In	2021 players
PR	Thomas du Toit; Michael Kumbirai (did not play); Mzamo Majola; Khutha Mchunu (did not play); John-Hubert Meyer; Ox Nché; Juan Schoeman	(substituted off) Juan Schoeman (to (England) Bath)	—N/a	—N/a
HK	Craig Burden; Fez Mbatha (did not play); Dylan Richardson; Kerron van Vuuren	(substituted off) Craig Burden (retired)	—N/a	—N/a
LK	Hyron Andrews; Tyler Paul; Le Roux Roets; Jordan Sesink-Clee (did not play); JJ van der Mescht (did not play); Emile van Heerden (did not play); Ruben van Heerden	(substituted off) Tyler Paul (to (Japan) NTT Red Hurricanes); (substituted off) Jordan Sesink-Clee (to Sharks)	—N/a	—N/a
FL	Phepsi Buthelezi; Celimpilo Gumede (did not play); Tera Mtembu (did not play); Sikhumbuzo Notshe; Andisa Ntsila (did not play); Evan Roos (did not play); James Venter	(substituted off) Tera Mtembu (to (United States) New England Free Jacks); (substituted off) Andisa Ntsila (to Cheetahs); (substituted off) Evan Roos (to Stormers)	—N/a	—N/a
N8	Henco Venter		—N/a	—N/a
SH	Jaden Hendrikse (did not play); Sanele Nohamba; Louis Schreuder; Grant Williams (did not play); Cameron Wright (did not play)	(substituted off) Louis Schreuder (to (England) Newcastle Falcons); (substituted off) Cameron Wright (to Sharks)	—N/a	—N/a
FH	Curwin Bosch; Jordan Chait (did not play); Boeta Chamberlain		—N/a	—N/a
CE	Lukhanyo Am; André Esterhuizen; Murray Koster (did not play); Marius Louw; Jeremy Ward	(substituted off) André Esterhuizen (to (England) Harlequins)	—N/a	—N/a
WG	Makazole Mapimpi; Lwazi Mvovo; Sbu Nkosi; JP Pietersen (did not play); Madosh Tambwe	(substituted off) Lwazi Mvovo (retired); (substituted off) JP Pietersen (retired); (substituted off) Madosh Tambwe (to Bulls)	—N/a	—N/a
FB	Thaakir Abrahams (did not play); Aphelele Fassi		—N/a	—N/a
Coach	Sean Everitt		—N/a	—N/a

== Stormers ==
In September 2020, SA Rugby confirmed that all South African sides would withdraw from Super Rugby, and look to join an expanded version of the Pro14. All players listed remained contracted to the Stormers for the Pro14 Rainbow Cup SA unless stated.

Stormers transfers 2020–2021
Pos	2020 squad	Out	In	2021 players
PR	Kwenzo Blose; Neethling Fouché (did not play); Steven Kitshoff; Wilco Louw; Leon Lyons (did not play); Frans Malherbe; Sazi Sandi (did not play); Ali Vermaak	(substituted off) Wilco Louw (to (England) Harlequins)	—N/a	—N/a
HK	Schalk Erasmus (did not play); Dan Jooste (did not play); Bongi Mbonambi; Scarra Ntubeni; Chad Solomon	(substituted off) Schalk Erasmus (to Bulls); (substituted off) Dan Jooste (to Sharks)	—N/a	—N/a
LK	Pieter-Steph du Toit; David Meihuizen; Salmaan Moerat; JD Schickerling; Ernst van Rhyn; Chris van Zyl	(substituted off) Chris van Zyl (retired)	—N/a	—N/a
FL	Ben-Jason Dixon (did not play); Johan du Toit; Siya Kolisi; Cobus Wiese; Nama Xaba (did not play)	(substituted off) Siya Kolisi (to Sharks); (substituted off) Cobus Wiese (to (England) Sale Sharks)	—N/a	—N/a
N8	Juarno Augustus; Jaco Coetzee	(substituted off) Jaco Coetzee (to (England) Bath)	—N/a	—N/a
SH	Paul de Wet; Herschel Jantjies; Godlen Masimla		—N/a	—N/a
FH	Jean-Luc du Plessis; Abner van Reenen (did not play); Damian Willemse	(substituted off) Jean-Luc du Plessis (to (Japan) Honda Heat)	—N/a	—N/a
CE	Dan du Plessis (did not play); Michal Haznar (did not play); Lyle Hendricks (did not play); Matt More (did not play); Ruhan Nel; Rikus Pretorius; Jamie Roberts	(substituted off) Matt More (to Pumas); (substituted off) Jamie Roberts (to (Wales) Dragons)	—N/a	—N/a
WG	Sergeal Petersen; Seabelo Senatla; Edwill van der Merwe (did not play); Leolin Zas (did not play)		—N/a	—N/a
FB	David Kriel (did not play); Dillyn Leyds	(substituted off) David Kriel (to Bulls); (substituted off) Dillyn Leyds (to (France) La Rochelle)	—N/a	—N/a
Coach	John Dobson		—N/a	—N/a

== See also ==
- List of 2020–21 Premiership Rugby transfers
- List of 2020–21 Pro14 transfers
- List of 2020–21 Top 14 transfers
- List of 2020–21 RFU Championship transfers
- List of 2020–21 Major League Rugby transfers
- SANZAAR
- Super Rugby franchise areas
