= 2015 Varsity Cup =

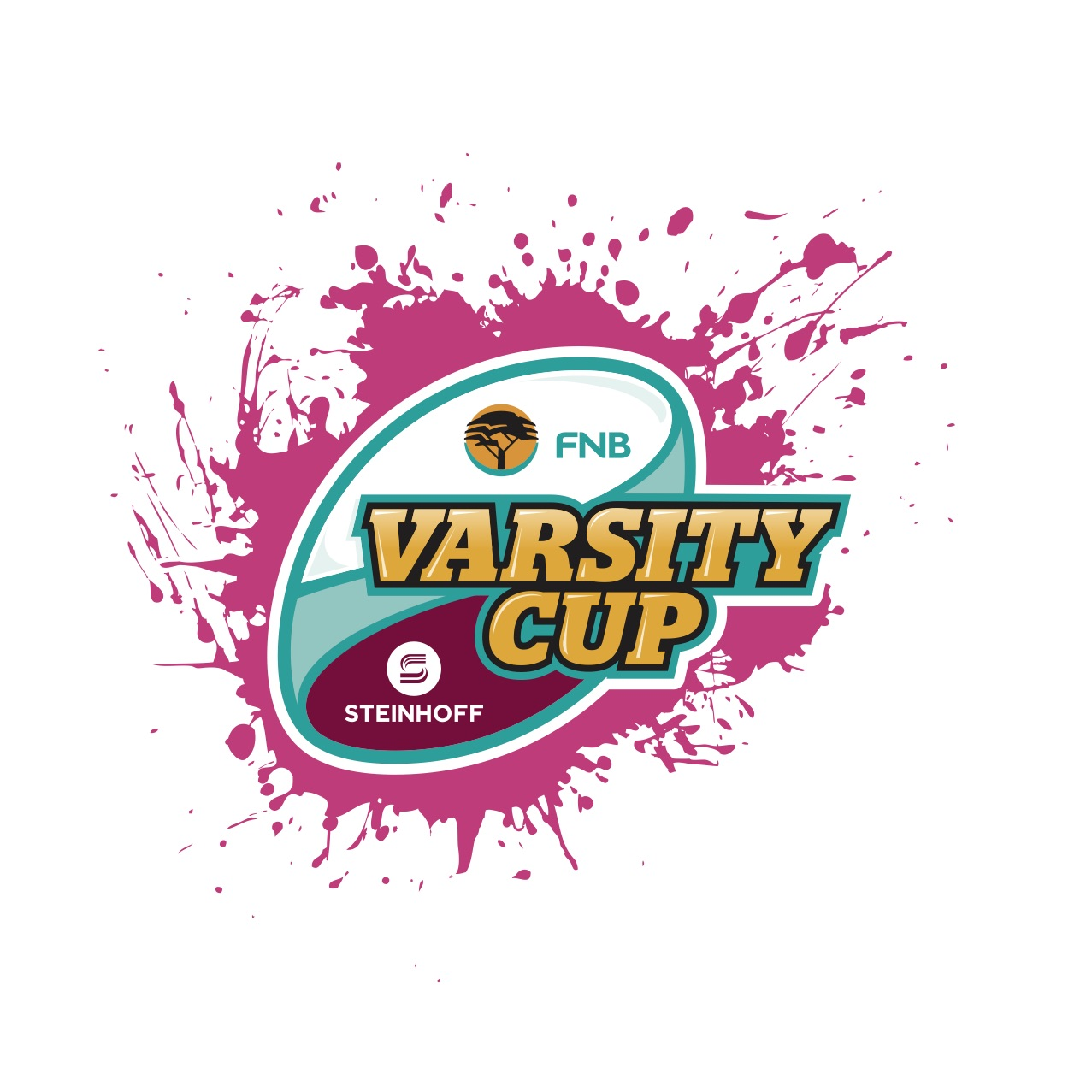
- Countries: South Africa
- Date: 9 February – 13 April 2015
- Champions: UFS Shimlas (1st title)
- Runners-up: NWU Pukke
- Relegated: None
- Matches played: 31
- Tries scored: 231 (average 7.5 per match)
- Top point scorer: Rhyno Smith (101)
- Top try scorer: Daniel Maartens / Gerhard Olivier (8)

The 2015 Varsity Cup was contested from 9 February to 13 April 2015. The tournament (also known as the FNB Varsity Cup presented by Steinhoff International for sponsorship reasons) was the eighth season of the Varsity Cup, an annual inter-university rugby union competition featuring eight South African universities.

The tournament was won by UFS Shimlas, who beat NWU Pukke 63–33 in the final played on 13 April 2015. No team was relegated to the second-tier Varsity Shield competition for 2016.

== Competition rules and information ==
There were eight participating universities in the 2015 Varsity Cup. These teams played each other once over the course of the season, either home or away.

Teams received four points for a win and two points for a draw. Bonus points were awarded to teams that scored four or more tries in a game, as well as to teams that lost a match by seven points or less. Teams were ranked by log points, then points difference (points scored less points conceded).

The top four teams qualified for the title play-offs. In the semi-finals, the team that finished first had home advantage against the team that finished fourth, while the team that finished second had home advantage against the team that finished third. The winners of these semi-finals played each other in the final, at the home venue of the higher-placed team.

There was no relegation to the Varsity Shield at the end of the season.

The 2015 Varsity Cup used a different scoring system than the common scoring system. Tries were worth five points as usual, but conversions were worth three points instead of two, while penalties and drop goals were only worth two points instead of three.

All Varsity Cup games also had two referees officiating each game, props' jerseys featured a special gripping patch to ensure better binding, intended to reduce collapsing scrums and the mark was extended to the entire field.

The Varsity Cup also reintroduced the White Card system from 2015. Under this system, either team's coach or captain could refer incidents for further review, similar to the Umpire Decision Review System used in cricket. They could have incidents reviewed that they believed were either given incorrectly or went unnoticed by the on-field referees. Each team was entitled to one review in each half of the match; if a review proved successful, the team retained their white card review for that half, but if it was unsuccessful, they lost the right to further reviews for the remainder of the half.

== Teams ==
Location of teams in the 2015 Varsity Cup

The following teams took part in the 2015 Varsity Cup competition:

2015 Varsity Cup teams
Team name	University	Stadium
CUT Ixias	Central University of Technology	CUT Stadium, Bloemfontein
Maties	Stellenbosch University	Danie Craven Stadium, Stellenbosch
NMMU Madibaz	Nelson Mandela Metropolitan University	NMMU Stadium, Port Elizabeth
NWU Pukke	North-West University	Fanie du Toit Sport Ground, Potchefstroom
UCT Ikey Tigers	University of Cape Town	UCT Rugby Fields, Cape Town
UFS Shimlas	University of the Free State	Shimla Park, Bloemfontein
UJ	University of Johannesburg	UJ Stadium, Johannesburg
UP Tuks	University of Pretoria	LC de Villiers Stadium, Pretoria

== Standings ==
The final league standings for the 2015 Varsity Cup were:

2015 Varsity Cup standings
Pos	Team	P	W	D	L	PF	PA	PD	TF	TA	TB	LB	Pts
1	UP Tuks	7	5	1	1	295	119	+176	41	15	7	1	30
2	UFS Shimlas	7	6	1	0	227	116	+111	33	16	4	0	30
3	UCT Ikey Tigers	7	4	1	2	258	157	+101	33	23	4	0	22
4	NWU Pukke	7	3	1	3	212	184	+28	30	25	5	2	21
5	Maties	7	3	2	2	177	171	+6	24	23	4	1	21
6	UJ	7	3	0	4	113	113	0	17	16	2	1	15
7	NMMU Madibaz	7	1	0	6	131	220	−89	19	31	2	1	7
8	CUT Ixias	7	0	0	7	63	396	−333	9	57	0	0	0

Legend and competition rules
Legend:
Top four teams; qualify to semi-finals.	P = Games played, W = Games won, D = Games drawn, L = Games lost, PF = Points for, PA = Points against, PD = Points difference, TF = Tries for, TA = Tries against, TB = Try bonus points, LB = Losing bonus points, Pts = Log points
No relegation.	P = Games played, W = Games won, D = Games drawn, L = Games lost, PF = Points for, PA = Points against, PD = Points difference, TF = Tries for, TA = Tries against, TB = Try bonus points, LB = Losing bonus points, Pts = Log points
Competition rules:
Play-offs: The top four teams qualify to the semi-finals. The first-placed team will host the fourth-placed team and the second-placed team will host the third-placed team. The higher-ranked semi-final winner will then host the lower-ranked semi-final winner in the final. Points breakdown: * 4 points for a win * 2 points for a draw * 1 bonus point for a loss by seven points or less * 1 bonus point for scoring four or more tries in a match

=== Round-by-round ===
The table below shows each team's progression throughout the season. For each round, their cumulative points total is shown with the overall log position in brackets:

Team Progression – 2015 Varsity Cup
Team	R1	R2	R3	R4	R5	R6	R7	Semi	Final
UP Tuks	3 (5th)	8 (1st)	13 (1st)	15 (2nd)	20 (1st)	25 (1st)	30 (1st)	Lost	—N/a
UFS Shimlas	3 (5th)	7 (3rd)	12 (2nd)	16 (1st)	20 (2nd)	25 (2nd)	30 (2nd)	Won	Won
UCT Ikey Tigers	3 (3rd)	3 (7th)	8 (5th)	13 (5th)	18 (3rd)	18 (4th)	22 (3rd)	Lost	—N/a
NWU Pukke	5 (2nd)	8 (2nd)	9 (4th)	14 (4th)	14 (5th)	19 (3rd)	21 (4th)	Won	Lost
Maties	3 (3rd)	6 (5th)	6 (7th)	7 (6th)	11 (6th)	16 (5th)	21 (5th)	—N/a	—N/a
UJ	5 (1st)	5 (6th)	9 (3rd)	14 (3rd)	15 (4th)	15 (6th)	15 (6th)	—N/a	—N/a
NMMU Madibaz	1 (7th)	6 (4th)	6 (6th)	6 (7th)	7 (7th)	7 (7th)	7 (7th)	—N/a	—N/a
CUT Ixias	0 (8th)	0 (8th)	0 (8th)	0 (8th)	0 (8th)	0 (8th)	0 (8th)	—N/a	—N/a
Key:	win	draw	loss						

== Pool stages ==
The 2015 Varsity Cup fixtures were released as follows:

- All times are South African (GMT+2).

=== Round one ===
9 February 2015	NWU Pukke	36–26	NMMU Madibaz	Fanie du Toit Sport Ground, Potchefstroom
16:45	Try: Rhyno Smith 13'; Rowayne Beukman 18'; Jeandré Rudolph 40'; Dalen Goliath 54'; Dean Stokes 73' penalty try 80'; Con: Dillon Smit (0/2); Rhyno Smith 55' (1/2); Warren Gilbert 80' (1/2); Cards: Loftus Morrison (yellow card) 33' to 43'; Johnny Welthagen (yellow card) 57' to 67'	Report; Scoreboard	Try: CJ Velleman 36'; Brian Skosana 51'; Tythan Adams 58'; Yamkela Ngam 68'; Con: Ruan Allerston 52', 59' (2/4); Cards: Brian Skosana (yellow card) 29' to 39' (red card) 71'; Andisa Ntsila (yellow card) 80'	Referee: Quinton Immelman & Cwengile Jadezweni

9 February 2015	CUT Ixias	10–46	UJ	CUT Stadium, Bloemfontein
18:30	Try: Anrich Bitzi 8'; Dean Kouprihanoff 58'; Con: Naudé van Biljon (0/1); Duan Pretorius (0/1)	Report; Scoreboard	Try: Kobus Porter 2', 6'; Aphiwe Dyantyi 31' penalty try 40'; Phanta Qinisile 44'; Andries Oosthuizen 53', 66'; Jaco Fourie 80'; Con: Jamie Campbell 7', 40' (2/6); Jaco Fourie (0/2)	Attendance: 3,000; Referee: Lourens van der Merwe & Jaco Kotze

9 February 2015	UFS Shimlas	29–29	UP Tuks	Shimla Park, Bloemfontein
18:30	Try: Niell Jordaan 9'; Gerhard Olivier 39'; Maputha Dolo 59'; Conraad van Vuuren 65'; Con: Niel Marais 10', 60', 66' (3/4)	Report; Scoreboard	Try: Riaan Britz 4'; Duncan Matthews 31'; Ryan Nell 45'; Dan Kriel 54'; Con: Joshua Stander 5', 32', 46' (3/4)	Attendance: 8,000; Referee: Pro Legoete & Jaco Pretorius

9 February 2015	UCT Ikey Tigers	32–32	Maties	UCT Rugby Fields, Cape Town
19:00	Try: Dylan Sage 4'; Mark Prior 43'; Guy Alexander 72' penalty try 77'; Con: Warren Seals 5', 44', 73', 78' (4/4)	Report; Scoreboard	Try: JP Lewis 39', 56'; Kobus van Dyk 52'; Craig Barry 66'; Con: Ernst Stapelberg 40' (1/1); Brandon Thomson 53', 57', 67' (3/3); Pen: Brandon Thomson (0/1)	Referee: Francois Pretorius & Rodney Boneparte

=== Round two ===
16 February 2015	NMMU Madibaz	34–13	CUT Ixias	NMMU Stadium, Port Elizabeth
16:45	Try: Enrico Acker 7', 21'; Devon Lailvaux 32', 63'; Tythan Adams 48'; Con: Ruan Allerston 22', 49', 64' (3/5); Cards: Arno Ebersohn (yellow card) 51' to 61'; CJ Velleman (yellow card) 51' to 61'; Tyler Paul (yellow card) 53' to 63'; Steven Hansel (yellow card) 66' to 76'; Tythan Adams (yellow card) 74'	Report; Scoreboard	Try: Ali Mgijima 67'; Masego Toolo 70'; Con: Naudé van Biljon (0/1); Jesse du Toit 71' (1/1); Cards: Frans Sisita (yellow card) 26' to 36'	Referee: Pro Legoete & Jaco Pretorius

16 February 2015	UP Tuks	39–24	UCT Ikey Tigers	LC de Villiers Stadium, Pretoria
18:30	Try: Jermaine Kleinsmith 3', 48'; Dan Kriel 29'; Ruan Steenkamp 45', 59'; Nqoba Mxoli 78'; Con: Joshua Stander 4', 30', 49' (3/5); Dewald Human (0/1)	Report; Scoreboard	Try: Robin Murray 56'; Guy Alexander 67'; Paul Cohen 76'; Con: Warren Seals 57', 67', 77' (3/3)	Referee: Quinton Immelman & Cwengile Jadezweni

16 February 2015	UJ	0–24	UFS Shimlas	UJ Stadium, Johannesburg
18:30	Cards: Kyle van Dalen (yellow card) 60'	Report; Scoreboard	Try: Conraad van Vuuren 49' penalty try 60'; Nico Lee 70'; Con: Niel Marais 50', 61', 71' (3/3); Cards: Tienie Burger (yellow card) 38' to 50'	Attendance: 6,000; Referee: Oregopotse Rametsi & Archie Sehlako

16 February 2015	Maties	26–26	NWU Pukke	Danie Craven Stadium, Stellenbosch
19:00	Try: Kobus van Dyk 9'; Beyers de Villiers 14', 29'; Ian Groenewald 78'; Con: Koos Loubser 10' (1/1); Ernst Stapelberg (0/1); Brandon Thomson 79' (1/1); Cards: Ernst Stapelberg (yellow card) 5' to 15'	Report; Scoreboard	Try: Dillon Smit 1' penalty try 5'; Rhyno Smith 56'; Dean Stokes 66'; Con: Rhyno Smith 2', 6' (2/4); Cards: Jeandré Rudolph (yellow card) 28' to 38'	Referee: Stephan Geldenhuys & Tahla Ntshakaza

=== Round three ===
23 February 2015	CUT Ixias	0–57	UFS Shimlas	CUT Stadium, Bloemfontein
16:45	Cards: Gerard Baard (yellow card) 38'; Boetie Maketlo (yellow card) 76'	Report; Scoreboard	Try: Arthur Williams 1'; Gerhard Olivier 4', 8'; Marco Klopper 25'; Vuyani Maqina 27', 32'; Daniel Maartens 48', 77'; Niell Jordaan 79'; Con: Niel Marais 2', 5', 26', 49' (4/7); Stephan Janse van Rensburg (0/2)	Referee: Quinton Immelman & Cwengile Jadezweni

23 February 2015	UP Tuks	53–8	Maties	LC de Villiers Stadium, Pretoria
19:00	Try: Jannes Kirsten 14'; Wiaan Liebenberg 21'; Reniel Hugo 24'; Rudolph Smith 32'; Dewald Human 41'; Jermaine Kleinsmith 50'; Nqoba Mxoli 70'; Con: Joshua Stander 22', 24', 33', 42', 51', 71' (6/7)	Report; Scoreboard	Try: JP Lewis 17'; Con: Brandon Thomson 18' (1/1)	Referee: Lourens van der Merwe & Jaco Kotze

23 February 2015	UCT Ikey Tigers	40–13	NMMU Madibaz	UCT Rugby Fields, Cape Town
18:30	Try: Warren Seals 7'; James Alexander 38'; Guy Alexander 45'; Jason Klaasen 50'; Luke Stringer 80'; Con: Warren Seals 8', 39', 46', 51', 81' (5/5); Cards: Chad Solomon (yellow card) 65' to 75'	Report; Scoreboard	Try: Tyler Paul 28'; Warrick Venter 74'; Con: Ruan Allerston 29' (1/1); Jarryd Buys (0/1)	Referee: Stephan Geldenhuys & Tahla Ntshakaza

23 February 2015	UJ	10–8	NWU Pukke	UJ Stadium, Johannesburg
18:30	Try: Kobus Porter 12'; Con: Jaco Fourie 13' (1/1); Pen: Jaco Fourie 40' (1/1); Cards: Werner Lourens (yellow card) 31'; Nico du Plessis (yellow card) 37'	Report; Scoreboard	Try: Dalen Goliath 70'; Con: Rhyno Smith 71' (1/1); Pen: Rhyno Smith (0/1)	Attendance: 8,000; Referee: Francois Pretorius & Rodney Boneparte

=== Round four ===
2 March 2015	UCT Ikey Tigers	90–8	CUT Ixias	UCT Rugby Fields, Cape Town
16:45	Try: Jason Klaasen 3'; Warren Seals 9', 41'; Ryan Dugmore 17', 68'; Khanyo Ngcukana 31', 79'; Chad Solomon 48'; Lihleli Xoli 54'; Dylan Sage 57'; Guy Schwikkard 65'; Luke Stringer 67'; Con: Warren Seals 10', 18', 32', 42' (4/5); Tom Bednall 49', 55', 58', 66', 69', 80' (6/7); Cards: Dylan Sage (yellow card) 36' to 45'	Report; Scoreboard	Try: Dean Kouprihanoff 77'; Con: Arrie Vosloo 78' (1/1)	Referee: Francois Pretorius & Rodney Boneparte

2 March 2015	NMMU Madibaz	13–42	UJ	NMMU Stadium, Port Elizabeth
19:00	Try: CJ Velleman 2'; Yamkela Ngam 42'; Con: Steven Hansel 3' (1/2)	Report; Scoreboard	Try: Kobus Porter 9'; Robert de Bruyn 12', 47'; Adrian Vermeulen 36'; Wian Conradie 68' penalty try 75'; Con: Jaco Fourie 10', 37', 69' (3/5); Jamie Campbell 76' (1/1); Cards: David Antonites (yellow card) 45' to 55'	Referee: Lourens van der Merwe & Jaco Kotze

2 March 2015	NWU Pukke	42–37	UP Tuks	Fanie du Toit Sport Ground, Potchefstroom
18:30	Try: Dalen Goliath 10'; Dean Stokes 32', 39'; Dillon Smit 58'; Marno Redelinghuys 77'; Con: Rhyno Smith 11', 33', 40', 59', 78' (5/5); Pen: Rhyno Smith 13' (1/2); Cards: Rhyno Smith (yellow card) 19' to 29'; Mogau Mabokela (yellow card) 66' to 76'	Report; Scoreboard	Try: Wiaan Liebenberg 18'; André Warner 25'; Clyde Davids 28'; Damian van Wyk 73'; Jaco Visagie 79'; Con: Joshua Stander 19', 29', 74', 80' (4/5)	Attendance: 10,000; Referee: Oregopotse Rametsi & Archie Sehlako

2 March 2015	UFS Shimlas	21–16	Maties	Shimla Park, Bloemfontein
18:30	Try: Niel Marais 5'; AJ Coertzen 20'; Daniel Maartens 64'; Con: Niel Marais 6', 21' (2/3); Pen: Niel Marais (0/1); Cards: Henco Venter (yellow card) 80'	Report; Scoreboard	Try: John-Hubert Meyer 14'; Bjorn Bernardo 26'; Con: Ernst Stapelberg 15', 27' (2/2)	Referee: Stephan Geldenhuys & Tahla Ntshakaza

=== Round five ===
9 March 2015	Maties	16–15	UJ	Danie Craven Stadium, Stellenbosch
16:45	Try: Beyers de Villiers 58'; Jacobus van der Merwe 69'; Con: Ernst Stapelberg 59' (1/1); Brandon Thomson 70' (1/1)	Report; Scoreboard	Try: Adrian Vermeulen 3'; Bradley Moolman 51'; Con: Jaco Fourie 4' (1/2); Pen: Jaco Fourie 37' (1/2)	Referee: Lourens van der Merwe & Jaco Kotze

9 March 2015	NWU Pukke	21–40	UCT Ikey Tigers	Fanie du Toit Sport Ground, Potchefstroom
19:00	Try: Jeandré Rudolph 5'; Rhyno Smith 12'; Johan Deysel 38'; Con: Rhyno Smith 13', 39' (2/3); Cards: Wilmar Arnoldi (yellow card) 78'	Report; Scoreboard	Try: Lihleli Xoli 2'; Jason Klaasen 16', 26', 78'; Khanyo Ngcukana 43'; Con: Warren Seals 3', 17', 27', 44', 79' (5/5); Pen: Warren Seals (0/1)	Referee: Pro Legoete & Jaco Pretorius

9 March 2015	NMMU Madibaz	21–23	UFS Shimlas	NMMU Stadium, Port Elizabeth
18:30	Try: Jarryd Buys 27'; Tythan Adams 51'; Tyler Paul 66'; Con: Steven Hansel 28', 67' (2/3); Cards: CJ Velleman (yellow card) 10' to 20'	Report; Scoreboard	Try: Fiffy Rampeta 3'; Teunis Nieuwoudt 11'; Renier Botha 19'; Con: Niel Marais 4', 12' (2/3); Pen: Niel Marais 81' (1/2)	Referee: Francois Pretorius & Rodney Boneparte

9 March 2015	UP Tuks	63–8	CUT Ixias	LC de Villiers Stadium, Pretoria
18:30	Try: Jannes Kirsten 1'; Dayan van der Westhuizen 9'; Jaco Visagie 26'; JT Jackson 35'; Jermaine Kleinsmith 38'; Reniel Hugo 46'; Clyde Davids 50'; Dan Kriel 57'; Jan Enslin 64'; Con: Dewald Human 10', 36', 39', 47', 50', 58' (6/9)	Report; Scoreboard	Try: Duan Pretorius 43'; Con: Duan Pretorius 44' (1/1)	Referee: Marius van der Westhuizen & Ben Crouse

=== Round six ===
16 March 2015	UFS Shimlas	44–24	UCT Ikey Tigers	Shimla Park, Bloemfontein
16:45	Try: Gerhard Olivier 1', 36', 59'; Joe van der Hoogt 16'; Daniel Maartens 19', 28'; Boela Venter 74'; Con: Niel Marais 17', 20', 38' (3/7)	Report; Scoreboard	Try: Lihleli Xoli 25', 65'; Guy Schwikkard 56'; Con: Nick Holton 26', 57', 66' (3/3)	Attendance: 2,000; Referee: Lourens van der Merwe & Jaco Kotze

16 March 2015	UJ	0–34	UP Tuks	UJ Stadium, Johannesburg
19:00		Report; Scoreboard	Try: Dan Kriel 23'; Dayan van der Westhuizen 51'; JT Jackson 60'; Joshua Stander 67'; Andrew Beerwinkel 74'; Con: Joshua Stander 61', 68', 74' (3/5)	Referee: Jaco Pretorius & Tahla Ntshakaza

16 March 2015	Maties	26–16	NMMU Madibaz	Danie Craven Stadium, Stellenbosch
18:30	Try: Beyers de Villiers 4'; Kobus van Dyk 48'; Niel Oelofse 55'; Michael Muller 68'; Con: Brandon Thomson 56', 69' (2/4)	Report; Scoreboard	Try: Devon Lailvaux 11'; Andisa Ntsila 44'; Con: Steven Hansel 12', 45' (2/2); Cards: Andisa Ntsila (yellow card) 48'	Referee: Quinton Immelman & Cwengile Jadezweni

16 March 2015	CUT Ixias	16–53	NWU Pukke	CUT Stadium, Bloemfontein
18:30	Try: Len Noort 12'; Duan Pretorius 70'; Con: Duan Pretorius 13', 71' (2/2)	Report; Scoreboard	Try: Dillon Smit 5'; Rhyno Smith 16'; Rowayne Beukman 19', 46'; Dean Stokes 25'; Molotsi Bouwer 67'; Loftus Morrison 80'; Con: Rhyno Smith 6', 20', 26', 47', 68', 80' (6/7)	Attendance: 2,000; Referee: Francois Pretorius & Rodney Boneparte

=== Round seven ===
23 March 2015	NMMU Madibaz	8–40	UP Tuks	NMMU Stadium, Port Elizabeth
16:45	Try: Brian Skosana 75'; Con: Steven Hansel 76' (1/1)	Report; Scoreboard	Try: Wiaan Liebenberg 6', 67'; Reniel Hugo 44'; Clyde Davids 62'; Riaan Britz 79'; Con: Joshua Stander 7', 45', 63' (3/3); Dewald Human 68', 80' (2/2)	Referee: Quinton Immelman & Cwengile Jadezweni

23 March 2015	UFS Shimlas	29–26	NWU Pukke	Shimla Park, Bloemfontein
19:00	Try: Elandré Huggett 9'; Niell Jordaan 18'; Gerhard Olivier 40', 65'; Con: AJ Coertzen 10', 19', 40' (3/4)	Report; Scoreboard	Try: Dalen Goliath 15'; Dillon Smit 43'; Johan Deysel 69', 75'; Con: Rhyno Smith 44', 76' (2/4)	Referee: Francois Pretorius & Rodney Boneparte

23 March 2015	UCT Ikey Tigers	8–0	UJ	UCT Rugby Fields, Cape Town
18:30	Try: Jason Klaasen 3'; Con: Warren Seals 4' (1/1); Pen: Warren Seals (0/1)	Report; Scoreboard		Referee: Lourens van der Merwe & Jaco Kotze

23 March 2015	CUT Ixias	8–53	Maties	CUT Stadium, Bloemfontein
18:30	Try: Lethole Mokoena 34'; Con: Duan Pretorius 35' (1/1); Cards: Mosego Toolo (yellow card) 16' to 26'; Duan Pretorius (yellow card) 59' to 71'	Report; Scoreboard	Try: Bjorn Bernardo 4'; Coenraad Fick 18', 31', 61'; Paul Streicher 54'; Kobus van Dyk 73'; Derick Linde 76'; Con: Brandon Thomson 5', 19', 32', 55' (4/5); Ernst Stapelberg 74', 77' (2/2)	Attendance: 1,500; Referee: Pro Legoete & Jaco Pretorius

== Play-offs ==
Semi-finals
30 March 2015
UFS Shimlas	21
UCT Ikey Tigers	10
30 March 2015
UP Tuks	28
NWU Pukke	29

Final
13 April 2015
UFS Shimlas	63
NWU Pukke	33

=== Semi-finals ===
30 March 2015
16:45

UFS Shimlas	21–10	UCT Ikey Tigers
Try: Niell Jordaan 10'; Daniel Maartens 28'; Maphutha Dolo 61'; Con: Niel Marais 11', 29' (2/3); Pen: Niel Marais (0/1)	Report; Scoreboard	Try: Jason Klaasen 18'; Chad Solomon 37'; Con: Warren Seals (0/2); Cards: Lihleli Xoli (yellow card) 72'

Shimla Park, Bloemfontein
Referee: Pro Legoete & Jaco Pretorius

30 March 2015
19:00

UP Tuks	28–29	NWU Pukke
Try: Wiaan Liebenberg 12'; JT Jackson 23'; Dan Kriel 46'; Clyde Davids 64'; Riaan Britz 71'; Con: Joshua Stander 47' (1/4); Dewald Human (0/1)	Report; Scoreboard	Try: Marno Redelinghuys 15'; Jeandré Rudolph 28'; Dillon Smit 57'; Johnny Welthagen 77'; Con: Rhyno Smith 20' (1/3); Dillon Smit (0/1); Pen: Rhyno Smith 21', 26', 39' (3/3); Cards: Jeandré Rudolph (yellow card) 9'

LC de Villiers Stadium, Pretoria
Referee: Rodney Boneparte & Francois Pretorius

=== Final ===
13 April 2015
19:00

UFS Shimlas	63–33	NWU Pukke
Try: Joe van der Hoogt 7'; Niell Jordaan 23'; Maphutha Dolo 34', 70'; Daniel Maartens 38', 74'; Nico Lee 42', 54'; Niel Marais 68'; Con: Niel Marais 8', 35', 43', 55', 68', 75' (6/9)	Report; Scoreboard"	Try: Malherbe Swart 9'; Johan Deysel 11'; Jeandré Rudolph 48'; Rowayne Beukman 82'; Con: Rhyno Smith 10', 12', 83' (3/4); Pen: Rhyno Smith 4', 27' (2/2); Cards: Marno Redelinghuys (yellow card) 6' to 17'; Jeandré Rudolph (yellow card) 31' to 41'

Shimla Park, Bloemfontein
Referee: Stephan Geldenhuys & Tahla Ntshakaza

Shimlas	NWU Pukke

FB	15	AJ Coertzen (c)
RW	14	Vuyani Maqina
OC	13	Nico Lee
IC	12	Tertius Kruger
LW	11	Maphutha Dolo
FH	10	Niel Marais
SH	9	Renier Botha
N8	8	Niell Jordaan
OF	7	Gerhard Olivier
BF	6	Daniel Maartens
RL	5	Johan van der Hoogt
LL	4	Henco Venter
TP	3	Conraad Van Vuuren
HK	2	Elandre Huggett
LP	1	Ox Nche
Replacements:
	16	Jacques du Toit
	17	Theunis Nieuwoudt
	18	Boela Venter
	19	De Wet Kruger
	20	Nhlanhla Hlongwane
	21	JP Coetzee
	22	Refuoe Rampete
	23	Dolph Botha
Coach:
Franco Smith

FB	15	Rhyno Smith
RW	14	Dalen Goliath
OC	13	Rowayne Beukman
IC	12	Johan Deysel
LW	11	Dillon Smit
FH	10	John Welthagen
SH	9	Malherbe Swart
N8	8	Jeandre Rudolph (c)
OF	7	Marno Redelinghuys
BF	6	Armandt Liebenberg
RL	5	Walt Steenkamp
LL	4	Loftus Morrison
TP	3	John-Roy Jenkinson
HK	2	Wian Fourie
LP	1	Johan Smith
Replacements:
	16	Wilmar Arnoldi
	17	Mogau Mabokelah
	18	Daniel Jordaan
	19	Molotsi Bouwer
	20	Johannes Briers
	21	Marnus Tack
	22	Kurshwill Williams
	23	Cayle Denner
Coach:
Robert Du Preez

Player of the Match:
Niel Marais UFS Shimlas

== Honours ==
The honour roll for the 2015 Varsity Cup was as follows:

2015 Varsity Cup Honours
Champions:	UFS Shimlas (1st title)
Player That Rocks:	Rhyno Smith, NWU Pukke
Forward That Rocks:	Jason Klaasen, UCT Ikey Tigers
Back That Rocks:	AJ Coertzen, UFS Shimlas
Top Try Scorers:	Daniel Maartens, UFS Shimlas / Gerhard Olivier, UFS Shimlas (8)
Top Points Scorer:	Rhyno Smith, NWU Pukke (101)

== Players ==
=== Player statistics ===
The following table contain points which have been scored in games in the 2015 Varsity Cup season:

All point scorers
No	Player	Team	T	C	P	DG	Pts
1	Rhyno Smith	NWU Pukke	4	23	6	0	101
2	Niel Marais	UFS Shimlas	2	25	1	0	87
3	Warren Seals	UCT Ikey Tigers	3	22	0	0	81
4	Joshua Stander	UP Tuks	1	23	0	0	74
5	Daniel Maartens	UFS Shimlas	8	0	0	0	40
5	Gerhard Olivier	UFS Shimlas	8	0	0	0	40
7	Brandon Thomson	Maties	0	12	0	0	36
8	Jason Klaasen	UCT Ikey Tigers	7	0	0	0	35
9	Dewald Human	UP Tuks	1	8	0	0	29
10	Niell Jordaan	UFS Shimlas	5	0	0	0	25
10	Dan Kriel	UP Tuks	5	0	0	0	25
10	Wiaan Liebenberg	UP Tuks	5	0	0	0	25
10	Dillon Smit	NWU Pukke	5	0	0	0	25
10	Dean Stokes	NWU Pukke	5	0	0	0	25
15	Jaco Fourie	UJ	1	5	2	0	24
16	Duan Pretorius	CUT Ixias	2	4	0	0	22
17	Rowayne Beukman	NWU Pukke	4	0	0	0	20
17	Clyde Davids	UP Tuks	4	0	0	0	20
17	Beyers de Villiers	Maties	4	0	0	0	20
17	Johan Deysel	NWU Pukke	4	0	0	0	20
17	Maphutha Dolo	UFS Shimlas	4	0	0	0	20
17	Dalen Goliath	NWU Pukke	4	0	0	0	20
17	Jermaine Kleinsmith	UP Tuks	4	0	0	0	20
17	Kobus Porter	UJ	4	0	0	0	20
17	Jeandré Rudolph	NWU Pukke	4	0	0	0	20
17	Kobus van Dyk	Maties	4	0	0	0	20
17	Lihleli Xoli	UCT Ikey Tigers	4	0	0	0	20
28	Ruan Allerston	NMMU Madibaz	0	6	0	0	18
28	Tom Bednall	UCT Ikey Tigers	0	6	0	0	18
28	Steven Hansel	NMMU Madibaz	0	6	0	0	18
28	Ernst Stapelberg	Maties	0	6	0	0	18
32	Tythan Adams	NMMU Madibaz	3	0	0	0	15
32	Guy Alexander	UCT Ikey Tigers	3	0	0	0	15
32	Riaan Britz	UP Tuks	3	0	0	0	15
32	Coenraad Fick	Maties	3	0	0	0	15
32	Reniel Hugo	UP Tuks	3	0	0	0	15
32	JT Jackson	UP Tuks	3	0	0	0	15
32	Devon Lailvaux	NMMU Madibaz	3	0	0	0	15
32	Nico Lee	UFS Shimlas	3	0	0	0	15
32	JP Lewis	Maties	3	0	0	0	15
32	Khanyo Ngcukana	UCT Ikey Tigers	3	0	0	0	15
42	AJ Coertzen	UFS Shimlas	1	3	0	0	14
43	Enrico Acker	NMMU Madibaz	2	0	0	0	10
43	Bjorn Bernardo	Maties	2	0	0	0	10
43	Robert de Bruyn	UJ	2	0	0	0	10
43	Ryan Dugmore	UCT Ikey Tigers	2	0	0	0	10
43	Dean Kouprihanoff	CUT Ixias	2	0	0	0	10
43	Jannes Kirsten	UP Tuks	2	0	0	0	10
43	Vuyani Maqina	UFS Shimlas	2	0	0	0	10
43	Nqoba Mxoli	UP Tuks	2	0	0	0	10
43	Yamkela Ngam	NMMU Madibaz	2	0	0	0	10
43	Andries Oosthuizen	UJ	2	0	0	0	10
43	Tyler Paul	NMMU Madibaz	2	0	0	0	10
43	Marno Redelinghuys	NWU Pukke	2	0	0	0	10
43	Dylan Sage	UCT Ikey Tigers	2	0	0	0	10
43	Guy Schwikkard	UCT Ikey Tigers	2	0	0	0	10
43	Chad Solomon	UCT Ikey Tigers	2	0	0	0	10
43	Brian Skosana	NMMU Madibaz	2	0	0	0	10
43	Ruan Steenkamp	UP Tuks	2	0	0	0	10
43	Luke Stringer	UCT Ikey Tigers	2	0	0	0	10
43	Joe van der Hoogt	UFS Shimlas	2	0	0	0	10
43	Dayan van der Westhuizen	UP Tuks	2	0	0	0	10
43	Conraad van Vuuren	UFS Shimlas	2	0	0	0	10
43	CJ Velleman	NMMU Madibaz	2	0	0	0	10
43	Adrian Vermeulen	UJ	2	0	0	0	10
43	Jaco Visagie	UP Tuks	2	0	0	0	10
67	Jamie Campbell	UJ	0	3	0	0	9
67	Nick Holton	UCT Ikey Tigers	0	3	0	0	9
69	James Alexander	UCT Ikey Tigers	1	0	0	0	5
69	Craig Barry	Maties	1	0	0	0	5
69	Andrew Beerwinkel	UP Tuks	1	0	0	0	5
69	Anrich Bitzi	CUT Ixias	1	0	0	0	5
69	Renier Botha	UFS Shimlas	1	0	0	0	5
69	Molotsi Bouwer	NWU Pukke	1	0	0	0	5
69	Jarryd Buys	NMMU Madibaz	1	0	0	0	5
69	Paul Cohen	UCT Ikey Tigers	1	0	0	0	5
69	Wian Conradie	UJ	1	0	0	0	5
69	Aphiwe Dyantyi	UJ	1	0	0	0	5
69	Jan Enslin	UP Tuks	1	0	0	0	5
69	Ian Groenewald	Maties	1	0	0	0	5
69	Elandré Huggett	UFS Shimlas	1	0	0	0	5
69	Marco Klopper	UFS Shimlas	1	0	0	0	5
69	Derick Linde	Maties	1	0	0	0	5
69	Duncan Matthews	UP Tuks	1	0	0	0	5
69	John-Hubert Meyer	Maties	1	0	0	0	5
69	Ali Mgijima	CUT Ixias	1	0	0	0	5
69	Lethole Mokoena	CUT Ixias	1	0	0	0	5
69	Bradley Moolman	UJ	1	0	0	0	5
69	Loftus Morrison	NWU Pukke	1	0	0	0	5
69	Michael Muller	Maties	1	0	0	0	5
69	Robin Murray	UCT Ikey Tigers	1	0	0	0	5
69	Ryan Nell	UP Tuks	1	0	0	0	5
69	Teunis Nieuwoudt	UFS Shimlas	1	0	0	0	5
69	Len Noort	CUT Ixias	1	0	0	0	5
69	Andisa Ntsila	NMMU Madibaz	1	0	0	0	5
69	Niel Oelofse	Maties	1	0	0	0	5
69	Mark Prior	UCT Ikey Tigers	1	0	0	0	5
69	Phanta Qinisile	UJ	1	0	0	0	5
69	Fiffy Rampeta	UFS Shimlas	1	0	0	0	5
69	Rudolph Smith	UP Tuks	1	0	0	0	5
69	Paul Streicher	Maties	1	0	0	0	5
69	Malherbe Swart	NWU Pukke	1	0	0	0	5
69	Masego Toolo	CUT Ixias	1	0	0	0	5
69	Jacobus van der Merwe	Maties	1	0	0	0	5
69	Damian van Wyk	UP Tuks	1	0	0	0	5
69	Boela Venter	UFS Shimlas	1	0	0	0	5
69	Warrick Venter	NMMU Madibaz	1	0	0	0	5
69	André Warner	UP Tuks	1	0	0	0	5
69	Johnny Welthagen	NWU Pukke	1	0	0	0	5
69	Arthur Williams	UFS Shimlas	1	0	0	0	5
111	Jesse du Toit	CUT Ixias	0	1	0	0	3
111	Warren Gilbert	NWU Pukke	0	1	0	0	3
111	Koos Loubser	Maties	0	1	0	0	3
111	Arrie Vosloo	CUT Ixias	0	1	0	0	3
—	penalty try	NWU Pukke	2	0	0	0	10
—	penalty try	UJ	2	0	0	0	10
—	penalty try	UCT Ikey Tigers	1	0	0	0	5
—	penalty try	UFS Shimlas	1	0	0	0	5

=== Squad lists ===
The teams released the following squad lists:

CUT Ixias

Forwards

- Gerard Baard
- Anrich Bitzi
- Daneel Botes
- Fanie Coetzer
- Jozua de Jager
- Jean-Claude Fourie
- Dean Kouprihanoff
- Boetie Maketlo
- Victor Maruping
- Rayno Nel
- JJ Nell
- Len Noort
- Jean Pretorius
- Dean Rossouw
- Jeandré Roux
- Neil Schoombee
- Ian Smith
- Frans Sisita
- Theunis Truter
- Did not play:
- Thabo Chirwa
- Wikus Davis
- Kyle Ess
- Deon Gouws
- Johann Grundlingh
- Carel Frederick Janse van Vuuren
- John Lonergan
- Vincent Maruping
- Ian van Wyk
- Jasper Wiese

Backs

- Luke Cyster
- Jesse du Toit
- Christiaan Erasmus
- Marius Grobler
- Charlie Hitchcock
- Henry Immelman
- Dean Jacobs
- Ali Mgijima
- Lethole Mokoena
- Johannes Nel
- Duan Pretorius
- Mosego Toolo
- Naudé van Biljon
- Arrie Vosloo
- Did not play:
- Heinrich Bitzi
- Chad de Koker
- Noël Marx
- Johan Nel
- Hanro Pretorius
- Werner Rembold
- Makgema Setlaba
- Clinton Toua

Coach

- Skillie Bester

}}

Maties

Forwards

- Wesley Adonis
- Justin Benn
- Lungelo Chonco
- Craig Corbett
- AJ de Klerk
- Beyers de Villiers
- Coenraad Fick
- Neethling Gericke
- Migael Grobler
- Ian Groenewald
- Marko Janse van Rensburg
- Derick Linde
- John-Hubert Meyer
- Devon Nash
- Niel Oelofse
- Grant Prior
- Wilhelm van der Sluys
- Jacobus van der Merwe
- Kobus van Dyk
- Janco Venter
- Did not play:
- Human Carstens
- Gareth Theunis de Bruin
- Jacobus de Kock
- Johan Roual de Villiers
- Andreas Rufus Dercksen
- Renier Ehlers
- Athenkosi Gaqa
- Liam Hendricks
- Rees Keene
- Freddie Kirsten
- Boeta Kleinhans
- Basil Liebenberg
- Justin Moberly
- GD Orlam
- Tangeni Sindano Shatiwa
- Willem Jacobus Smith
- Attie Francois van Rensburg
- Willem van Schalkwyk

Backs

- Brandon Asher-Wood
- Craig Barry
- Bjorn Bernardo
- Jamie Joseph
- Kyle Leibrandt
- JP Lewis
- Koos Loubser
- Remu Malan
- Michael Muller
- Jean Nel
- Louis Nel
- Ernst Stapelberg
- Paul Streicher
- Brandon Thomson
- Christoff van Tonder
- Did not play:
- Louis Jordaan
- Christopher James Keet
- William Robin Keet
- Jacquin Adrian Marthinus
- Carlisle Nel
- Ryan Oosthuizen
- Jakobus Putter
- Chris Smit
- Chris Smith
- Kyle Steyn
- Jan Abraham Venter
- Divan Visser
- James Edward Vorster
- Jason Worrall

Coach

- Chris Rossouw

}}

NMMU Madibaz

Forwards

- Laurence Christie
- Ivan-John du Preez
- Arno Ebersohn
- Wynand Grassmann
- Rob Louw
- Marzuq Maarman
- Andisa Ntsila
- Philip Odendaal
- Brenden Olivier
- Tyler Paul
- Jody Reyneke
- Steven-Floyd Robbeson
- Elandré van der Merwe
- Dane van der Westhuyzen
- CJ Velleman
- Warrick Venter
- Stephan Zaayman
- Did not play:
- Cody Basson
- Ruben Fourie
- Kevin Kaba
- Marius le Roux
- Sintu Manjezi
- Zaine Marx
- Tyrone Rankin
- Nic Roebeck

Backs

- Enrico Acker
- Tythan Adams
- Ruan Allerston
- Eben Barnard
- Michael Bernardt
- Jarryd Buys
- Steven Hansel
- Andile Jho
- Creswin Joseph
- Devon Lailvaux
- Ivan Ludick
- Khaya Molotana
- Yamkela Ngam
- Brian Skosana
- Did not play:
- Aya Dlepu
- Luan Nieuwoudt
- Juan Smit
- Franswa Ueckermann
- MC Venter
- Lindelwe Zungu

Coach

- David Maidza

}}

NWU Pukke

Forwards

- Wilmar Arnoldi
- Molotsi Bouwer
- Jaco Buys
- Cayle Denner
- Wian Fourie
- John-Roy Jenkinson
- Danie Jordaan
- Armandt Liebenberg
- Mogau Mabokela
- Loftus Morrison
- Marno Redelinghuys
- Jeandré Rudolph
- Joe Smith
- Walt Steenkamp
- Ruan Venter
- Jacques Vermaak
- Rhyk Welgemoed
- Did not play:
- Jaco Botha
- Joshwine Cornelius
- Funane Mabala
- Mash Mafela
- Lucky Ngcamu
- PJ Uys

Backs

- Rowayne Beukman
- Myburgh Briers
- Johan Deysel
- Warren Gilbert
- Dalen Goliath
- Dillon Smit
- Heinrich Smit
- Rhyno Smith
- Dean Stokes
- Malherbe Swart
- Marnus Tack
- Johnny Welthagen
- Juandré Williams
- Percy Williams
- Did not play:
- Lucian Cupido
- Tiaan Dorfling
- Dries du Plooy
- Arthur Festus
- Sylvian Mahuza
- Henko Marais
- Alvino Montjies
- Akhona Nela
- Luther Obi
- Adriaan Oosthuizen
- Chriswill September

Coach

- Robert du Preez

}}

UCT Ikey Tigers

Forwards

- Guy Alexander
- Mike Botha
- Joel Carew
- Mike Kennedy
- James Kilroe
- Jason Klaasen
- Jade Kriel
- David Maasch
- Robin Murray
- Mark Prior
- Chad Solomon
- Luke Stringer
- Digby Webb
- Kyle Whyte
- Tino Zakeyo
- Msizi Zondi
- Did not play:
- Brad Bosman
- Gareth Ehret
- Sebastian Ferreira
- Olwethu Hans
- Matthew Jones
- Aiden Monk
- Aphiwe Qaba
- Kiernan Allan Rabie
- Duncan Saffy
- Rushdie Salie
- Alva Senderayi
- Joshua John Smallbones
- Devon Stone
- Stuart William Stopforth
- Nyasha Tarusenga
- Samuel Theron
- Keagan Timm

Backs

- James Alexander
- Tom Bednall
- Paul Cohen
- Ryan Dugmore
- Dean Gericke
- Nick Holton
- Nate Nel
- Khanyo Ngcukana
- Brendan Rodgers
- Dylan Sage
- Guy Schwikkard
- Warren Seals
- Richard Stewart
- Lihleli Xoli
- Did not play:
- Greg Alexander
- Daniel Ben Keys Anderson
- Robert Anderson
- Suwi Chibale
- Steven Cullingworth
- Stefano de Gouveia
- Paul Hendry
- Bradley Janse van Rensburg
- Huw Jones
- Karl Brian Martin
- Gianluca Salvador Rizzo
- Sebastian Roodt
- Jarryd Sage
- Justin Scott
- Joel Smith
- Dylan-Lee Tidbury
- Steve Wallace
- Storm Michael Winter

Coach

- Kevin Musikanth

}}

UFS Shimlas

Forwards

- Dolph Botha
- Tienie Burger
- Neil Claassen
- Jacques du Toit
- Elandré Huggett
- Nicolaas Immelman
- Niell Jordaan
- Marco Klopper
- De Wet Kruger
- Daniel Maartens
- Steven Meiring
- Chase Morison
- Ox Nché
- Teunis Nieuwoudt
- Gerhard Olivier
- Fiffy Rampeta
- Hennie-Schalk Theron
- Joe van der Hoogt
- Conraad van Vuuren
- Boela Venter
- Henco Venter
- Did not play:
- Murray Bondesio
- Armandt Koster
- Markus Odendaal
- Justin Pappin
- Ockie van Zyl

Backs

- Renier Botha
- AJ Coertzen
- JP Coetzee
- Maphutha Dolo
- Kay-Kay Hlongwane
- Stephan Janse van Rensburg
- Tertius Kruger
- Nico Lee
- Vuyani Maqina
- Niel Marais
- Marco Mason
- Zee Mkhabela
- Arthur Williams
- Did not play:
- Pieter-Steyn de Wet
- Ludwig Erasmus
- Tanaks Takudzwa Matsinde
- Francois Pretorius

Coach

- Franco Smith

}}

| basestyle = UJ

Forwards

- David Antonites
- Wian Conradie
- Nico du Plessis
- Brandon Landsberg
- Werner Lourens
- Gareth Milasinovich
- Etienne Oosthuizen
- Dylan Peterson
- Kobus Porter
- Phanta Qinisile
- Raeez Salie
- Baksteen Snyman
- Kyle van Dalen
- Griffith van Wyk
- Did not play:
- Dillon Bakos
- Steven Barber
- Pieter Jansen
- Jeremy Jordaan
- Kyle Kruger
- Ruan Macdonald
- Tiaan Macdonald
- Vernon Petersen
- Achmad Salie
- Victor Sekekete
- Waldo Weideman

Backs

- Ronald Brown
- Jamie Campbell
- Robert de Bruyn
- Aphiwe Dyantyi
- Chuma Faas
- Jaco Fourie
- Dominic Kroezen
- Bradley Moolman
- Hilton Mudariki
- Andries Oosthuizen
- Adrian Vermeulen
- Did not play:
- Kofi Appiah
- JJ de Klerk
- Kallie Erasmus
- Selom Gavor
- Thato Marobela
- Divan Johannes Nel
- Jacques Nel
- Godfrey Ramaboea
- Lukas van Zyl
- PJ Walters

Coach

- Skollie Janse van Rensburg

}}

UP Tuks

Forwards

- Andrew Beerwinkel
- Clyde Davids
- Jan Enslin
- Justin Forwood
- Neethling Fouché
- Irné Herbst
- Reniel Hugo
- Pieter Jansen van Vuren
- Jason Jenkins
- Jannes Kirsten
- Wiaan Liebenberg
- Nqoba Mxoli
- Juan Schoeman
- Rudolph Smith
- Ruan Steenkamp
- Jan van der Merwe
- Dayan van der Westhuizen
- Heinrich Viljoen
- Jaco Visagie
- Dennis Visser
- Did not play:
- Derek Botha
- Wesley Cloete
- Christiaan de Bruin
- Corniel Els
- Pieter Johan Griesel
- Primo Ncube

Backs

- Riaan Britz
- Dewald Human
- JT Jackson
- Jermaine Kleinsmith
- Dan Kriel
- Adrian Maebane
- Duncan Matthews
- Ryan Nell
- Jacques Rossouw
- Joshua Stander
- Emile Temperman
- Damian van Wyk
- André Warner
- Did not play:
- Wesley Cupido
- Carlo Engelbrecht
- Andries Jacobus Kruger
- Kefentse Mahlo
- Ganfried May
- JP Smith
- Jade Stighling
- Francois Tredoux
- Leighton van Wyk
- Impi Visser

Coach

- Pote Human

}}

=== Discipline ===
The following table contains all the cards handed out during the tournament:

Cards
Player	Team	Red card	Temporarily suspended
Jeandré Rudolph	NWU Pukke	0	3
Andisa Ntsila	NMMU Madibaz	0	2
Brian Skosana	NMMU Madibaz	0	2
CJ Velleman	NMMU Madibaz	0	2
Tythan Adams	NMMU Madibaz	0	1
David Antonites	UJ	0	1
Wilmar Arnoldi	NWU Pukke	0	1
Gerard Baard	CUT Ixias	0	1
Tienie Burger	UFS Shimlas	0	1
Nico du Plessis	UJ	0	1
Ivan-John du Preez	NMMU Madibaz	0	1
Arno Ebersohn	NMMU Madibaz	0	1
Steven Hansel	NMMU Madibaz	0	1
Werner Lourens	UJ	0	1
Mogau Mabokela	NWU Pukke	0	1
Boetie Maketlo	CUT Ixias	0	1
Loftus Morrison	NWU Pukke	0	1
Duan Pretorius	CUT Ixias	0	1
Marno Redelinghuys	NWU Pukke	0	1
Dylan Sage	UCT Ikey Tigers	0	1
Frans Sisita	CUT Ixias	0	1
Rhyno Smith	NWU Pukke	0	1
Chad Solomon	UCT Ikey Tigers	0	1
Ernst Stapelberg	Maties	0	1
Mosego Toolo	CUT Ixias	0	1
Kyle van Dalen	UJ	0	1
Henco Venter	UFS Shimlas	0	1
Johnny Welthagen	NWU Pukke	0	1
Lihleli Xoli	UCT Ikey Tigers	0	1
* Legend: (red card) = Sent off, (yellow card) = Sin-binned

=== Dream Team ===
After the 2015 Varsity Cup, a Varsity Cup Dream Team was announced. This team would play against the South Africa Under-20s in Stellenbosch on 21 April 2015. The head coach of the champions UFS Shimlas, Franco Smith, was appointed as the coach of the side and UP Tuks lock Reniel Hugo was appointed as captain. Inny Radebe, who played for the 2015 Varsity Shield champions UKZN Impi was also named in the squad.

Dan Kriel and Jaco Visagie were originally selected in the 2015 Varsity Cup Dream Team, but subsequently replaced by Johan Deysel and Elandré Huggett respectively.

Varsity Cup Dream Team
Forwards	Irné Herbst • Elandré Huggett • Reniel Hugo • John-Roy Jenkinson • Wiaan Liebenberg • Nqoba Mxoli • Gerhard Olivier • Jeandré Rudolph • Joe Smith • Chad Solomon • Walt Steenkamp • Dayan van der Westhuizen • Henco Venter
Backs	Rowayne Beukman • Johan Deysel • Maphutha Dolo • JP Lewis • Zee Mkhabela • Inny Radebe • Dillon Smit • Rhyno Smith • Johnny Welthagen
Coach	Franco Smith

The Dream Team made the early running in the match, with two first-half tries – a penalty try and a try by full-back Rhyno Smith – giving them a 12–10 half-time lead over the South African Under-20s. Second-half tries by Dillon Smit and Elandré Huggett proved to not be enough, with the South African Under-20s running out 31–24 winners.

21 April 2015	Varsity Cup Dream Team	24–31	South Africa Under-20	Danie Craven Stadium, Stellenbosch
18:30	Try: penalty try 22'; Rhyno Smith 38'; Dillon Smit 59'; Elandré Huggett 69'; Con: Inny Radebe 23' (1/2); Rhyno Smith 60' (1/2); Cards: Dayan van der Westhuizen (yellow card) 65' to 74'	Scoreboard	Try: Daniël du Plessis 36'; Jan van der Merwe 43' penalty try 65'; Con: Ernst Stapelberg 37' (1/2); Brandon Thomson 66' (1/1); Pen: Ernst Stapelberg 40', 48' (2/2); Brandon Thomson 73', 76' (2/2); Cards: Jean-Luc du Preez (yellow card) 22' to 32'

== Referees ==
The following referees officiated matches in the 2015 Varsity Cup:

- Rodney Boneparte
- Ben Crouse
- Stephan Geldenhuys
- Quinton Immelman
- Cwengile Jadezweni
- Jaco Kotze
- Pro Legoete
- Tahla Ntshakaza
- Francois Pretorius
- Jaco Pretorius
- Oregopotse Rametsi
- Archie Sehlako
- Lourens van der Merwe
- Marius van der Westhuizen

== See also ==
- Varsity Cup
- 2015 Varsity Rugby
- 2015 Varsity Shield
- 2015 SARU Community Cup
- 2015 Vodacom Cup
