= South Africa Universities rugby union team =

South Africa
- Union: South African Rugby Union
Team kit

The South Africa Universities rugby union team – also called the South African Students rugby union team – is a South African representative rugby union team that is usually named on an annual basis and that would participate in first class matches on an intermittent basis.

Since the launch and subsequent growth in popularity of the Varsity Cup competition in 2008, the South African Universities rugby union team effectively became a team selected from the best Varsity Cup players; in 2015, the team was called the Varsity Cup Dream Team.

== Players ==
The most recent squad was named after the 2015 Varsity Cup; this side would play against South Africa Under-20 in Stellenbosch:

Props: John-Roy Jenkinson; Nqoba Mxoli; Joe Smith; Dayan van der Westhuizen; Hookers: Elandré Huggett; Chad Solomon; Locks: Irné Herbst; Reniel Hugo; Walt Steenkamp	Loose forwards: Wiaan Liebenberg; Gerhard Olivier; Jeandré Rudolph; Henco Venter; Scrum-halves: Zee Mkhabela; Dillon Smit; Fly-halves: Inny Radebe; Johnny Welthagen	Centres: Rowayne Beukman; Johan Deysel; Wingers: Maphutha Dolo; JP Lewis; Lihleli Xoli; Fullbacks: Rhyno Smith; Head coach: Franco Smith

- Dan Kriel and Jaco Visagie were originally selected in the 2015 Varsity Cup Dream Team, but subsequently replaced by Johan Deysel and Elandré Huggett respectively.

== Results and fixtures ==
21 April 2015	Varsity Cup Dream Team	24–31	South Africa Under-20	Danie Craven Stadium, Stellenbosch
18:30	Try: penalty try 22'; Rhyno Smith 38'; Dillon Smit 59'; Elandré Huggett 69'; Con: Inny Radebe 23' (1/2); Rhyno Smith 60' (1/2); Cards: Dayan van der Westhuizen (yellow card) 65' to 74'	Scoreboard"	Try: Daniël du Plessis 36'; Jan van der Merwe 43' penalty try 65'; Con: Ernst Stapelberg 37' (1/2); Brandon Thomson 66' (1/1); Pen: Ernst Stapelberg 40', 48' (2/2); Brandon Thomson 73', 76' (2/2); Cards: Jean-Luc du Preez (yellow card) 22' to 32'

4 May 2013	Namibia	39–50	South African Universities	Hage Geingob Stadium, Windhoek
	Try: PJ van Lill; Malcolm Moore; Ian van Wyk; Callie Swanepoel; Con: Justin Nel; Theuns Kotzé; Pen: Justin Nel	Report	Try: JP Lewis; Martin Ferreira; JR Esterhuizen; Os Hamman; Roy Godfrey; Con: Justin van Staden

25 June 2012	Namibia	24–34	South African Students	Nelson Mandela Bay Stadium, Port Elizabeth
	Try: Tinus du Plessis; Danie Dames; Chrysander Botha; Con: Theuns Kotzé; Pen: Theuns Kotzé	Report	Try: André Smith; Hugo Kloppers; John-Roy Jenkinson; Divan van Zyl; Con: Franna du Toit; André Kemp; Pen: Franna du Toit

19 June 2012	Eastern Province Kings	36–19	South African Students	Nelson Mandela Bay Stadium, Port Elizabeth
19:00	Try: Marcello Sampson; Jongi Nokwe; George Whitehead; Cornell du Preez; Con: George Whitehead; Wesley Dunlop; Pen: Wesley Dunlop	Report	Try: Joe Seerane; François du Toit penalty try Con: André Kemp; Franna du Toit

== See also ==
- Varsity Cup
- Emerging Springboks
- South African Barbarians
