= Hanro Liebenberg =

South African rugby union player

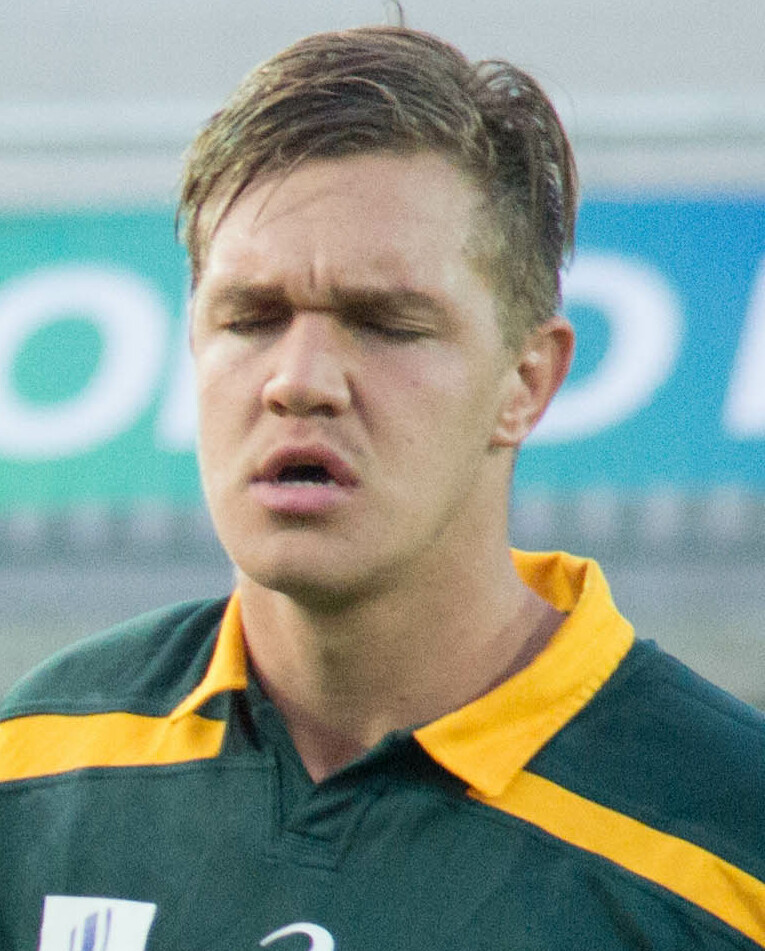
- Liebenberg in 2015
- Born: 10 October 1995 (age 31) Brackenfell, South Africa
- Height: 1.97 m (6 ft 5 1/2 in)
- Weight: 110 kg (17 st 5 lb; 243 lb)
- School: HTS Drostdy, Worcester
- Notable relative: Wiaan Liebenberg (brother)

Rugby union career
- Position: Number eight/Flanker
- Current team: Bulls
Youth career
- 2012–2013: Boland Cavaliers
- 2014–2016: Blue Bulls
Senior career
Years	Team	Apps	(Points)
2015–2019	Bulls	44	(35)
2015–2016	Blue Bulls	20	(20)
2016–2018	Blue Bulls XV	10	(20)
2018–2019	→ Stade Français	5	(5)
2019–2026	Leicester Tigers	152	(165)
2026–	Blue Bulls		
- Correct as of 13 June 2026
International career
Years	Team	Apps	(Points)
2015	South Africa Under-20	5	(10)
- Correct as of 11 April 2018

Hanro Liebenberg (born 10 October 1995) is a South African rugby union player for Bulls in the URC. Between 2019 and 2026 he played 152 times for Leicester Tigers in England's Premiership Rugby, including captaining the side for a season. Previously played for the Bulls in Super Rugby, the Blue Bulls in the Currie Cup and the Blue Bulls XV in the Rugby Challenge. His regular playing position is number eight and flanker.

Liebenberg was a Premiership Rugby champion in 2022, scoring the first try in the final.

== Career ==
=== Youth ===
Liebenberg was twice selected to represent Boland at the annual Under-18 Craven Week tournaments; in 2012, he played for them at the tournament held in Port Elizabeth and he once again played in 2013, captaining the side and scoring two tries in their match against the hosts Limpopo Blue Bulls in Polokwane.

=== Blue Bulls / Bulls ===
After finishing school, Liebenberg made the move to Pretoria to join the Blue Bulls, following in the footsteps of older brother Wiaan who made the move three years earlier. He represented the Blue Bulls U19 side in the 2014 Under-19 Provincial Championship, quickly establishing himself as a key player for the side. He started thirteen of their fourteen matches during the campaign, scoring seven tries (including a hat-trick in their derby match against Golden Lions in a 37–30 win) as the Blue Bulls made it all the way to the final of the competition, where they lost to Western Province U19 in Cape Town.

Despite not having played any first class matches, Liebenberg was selected in the Bulls' 55-man wider training squad prior the 2015 Super Rugby season. He also made the cut for the final squad and was named on the bench for their Round Two match against the Hurricanes in Pretoria. He made his debut, coming on as an injury replacement for Deon Stegmann in the first half, but ended the match on the losing side, with the Hurricanes running out 17–13 winners. In March 2015, Liebenberg was named in a South Africa Under-20 training group as part of their preparation for the 2015 World Rugby Under 20 Championship. He featured for them in a friendly match against a Varsity Cup Dream Team in April 2015. In May 2015, he was included in the South Africa Under-20 squad that toured Argentina. He started in their second tour match, captaining the side and scoring a try in a 39–28 victory.

Upon the team's return, Liebenberg was named as captain of the side for the 2015 World Rugby Under 20 Championship. He started all three of their matches in Pool B of the competition; a 33–5 win against hosts Italy during which Liebenberg scored one of South Africa's tries, their match against Samoa which once again saw Liebenberg score a try in a 40–8 win and a 46–13 win over Australia to help South Africa finish top of Pool B to qualify for the semi-finals with the best record pool stage of all the teams in the competition. Liebenberg started their semi-final match against England, but could not prevent them losing 20–28 to be eliminated from the competition by England for the second year in succession and also started their third-place play-off match against France, helping South Africa to a 31–18 win to secure third place in the competition.

In June 2015, Liebenberg extended his contract at the Bulls until October 2017. During December 2018 and January 2019 he played for Stade Français in France's Top 14 on loan.

=== Leicester Tigers ===
On 2 July 2019, Leicester Tigers announced Liebenberg as a new signing for the 2019–20 season. Liebenberg made his Leicester debut on 27 September 2019 in a Premiership Rugby Cup match against Exeter Chiefs. On 7 July 2020, Liebenberg extended his contract with Leicester, and the following season was voted as the club's Player of the season. On 26 August 2021 he was appointed as Leicester's vice-captain for the 2021–22 season.Ahead of the 2022/23 Hanro has been named Captain of Leicester Tigers. Liebenberg started the 2022 Premiership Rugby final, scoring the first try and securing the final kick off as Leicester won 15-12 against Saracens. He made his 100th appearance for Leicester on 18 February 2024, in their Premiership Rugby Cup semi final game against Ealing Trailfinders.

== Personal life ==
Liebenberg is the younger brother of Wiaan Liebenberg, a former player with Stade Rochelais and the captain of the South African Under-20 squad that won the 2012 IRB Junior World Championship.
