= Niell Jordaan =

South African rugby union player (born 1992)

- Full name: Daniel Niell Jordaan
- Born: 13 January 1992 (age 34) Newcastle, South Africa
- Height: 1.90 m (6 ft 3 in)
- Weight: 103 kg (16 st 3 lb; 227 lb)
- School: Grey College, Bloemfontein

Rugby union career
- Position: No 8 / Flanker
- Current team: Griquas
Youth career
- 2005–2008: Pumas
- 2009–2013: Free State Cheetahs
Amateur team(s)
Years	Team	Apps	(Points)
2013–2015	UFS Shimlas	18	(40)
Senior career
Years	Team	Apps	(Points)
2013	Free State XV	4	(0)
2014	Griffons	3	(0)
2015–2018	Free State Cheetahs	28	(25)
2015–2019	Cheetahs	28	(10)
2016–2019	Free State XV	18	(20)
2019–present	Griquas	7	(0)
- Correct as of 3 September 2019
International career
Years	Team	Apps	(Points)
2008	South Africa Under-16 Elite Squad		
2010	South Africa Schools; High Performance squad		
- Correct as of 22 April 2018

Daniel Niell Jordaan (born 13 January 1992) is a South African professional rugby union player for Griquas in the Currie Cup and the Rugby Challenge. His regular position is number eight.

== Career ==
=== Schools rugby ===
Jordaan earned a provincial call-up as early as primary school level, representing the Pumas at the 2005 Under-13 Craven Week competition. He was once again called up in 2008, playing for them at the Under-16 Grant Khomo week, which earned him an inclusion in the South African Under-16 Elite Squad.

Jordaan moved to Bloemfontein in 2009 to finish his schooling at Grey College. He represented the Free State at the premier high school rugby union competition, the Under-18 Craven Week, on two occasions; at the 2009 event in East London and at the 2010 event in Welkom, where Free State beat Western Province 42–21 in the main match of the competition. Jordaan was subsequently included in a South African Under-18 High Performance Squad, which played matches against France, England and Namibia.

=== Free State Cheetahs / UFS Shimlas / Griffons ===
After finishing high school, Jordaan joined the Free State Academy and appeared for the Free State U19 side in the 2011 Under-19 Provincial Championship, where he made seven appearances as his side reached the semi-finals of the competition. He progressed to the Free State U21 squad in 2012 and started all thirteen of their matches during the 2012 Under-21 Provincial Championship, scoring three tries as his side once again reached the semi-finals.

The following season, Jordaan played in the 2013 Varsity Cup for UFS Shimlas, making two appearances. He was then included in the Free State XV squad for the 2013 Vodacom Cup and he made his first class debut in their 33–34 defeat to a Sharks XV in Durban in Round Three of the competition by coming on as a late replacement. He got increasingly more game time off the bench in his two appearances against the Border Bulldogs in Alice and Argentine side Pampas XV in Stellenbosch before making his first start in a senior match in a 37–41 defeat to Western Province in Bloemfontein which condemned them to fifth spot on the log, missing out on a quarter final spot. He returned to action for the Free State U21 side during the 2013 Under-21 Provincial Championship, making seven starts.

Jordaan played seven times for the UFS Shimlas during the 2014 Varsity Cup competition, scoring a try against Wits and a brace against NWU Pukke a week later.

Jordaan also started two matches for Welkom-based provincial outfit Griffons during the 2014 Vodacom Cup competition and made one appearance for them in the 2014 Currie Cup qualification tournament in their match against the SWD Eagles in George, his first appearance in the Currie Cup competition.

Jordaan started all nine of the UFS Shimlas' matches during the 2015 Varsity Cup competition. He scored three tries during the round-robin stage of the competition to help Shimlas finish top of the log and qualify for a home semi-final. He opened the scoring in their semi-final match against two-time champions UCT Ikey Tigers by scoring a 10th-minute try in a 21–10 victory to help them qualify for their first ever final. He scored yet another try in the final against the NWU Pukke as Shimlas ran out comfortable 63–33 winners to win their first ever Varsity Cup title.

=== Cheetahs ===
After the 2015 Varsity Cup, Shimlas head coach Franco Smith was appointed as the head coach of Super Rugby side the Cheetahs and he included four Shimlas players in his first match in charge against the Waratahs, with Jordaan named as the starting number eight for the match.
