= Wiaan Liebenberg =

South African rugby union player

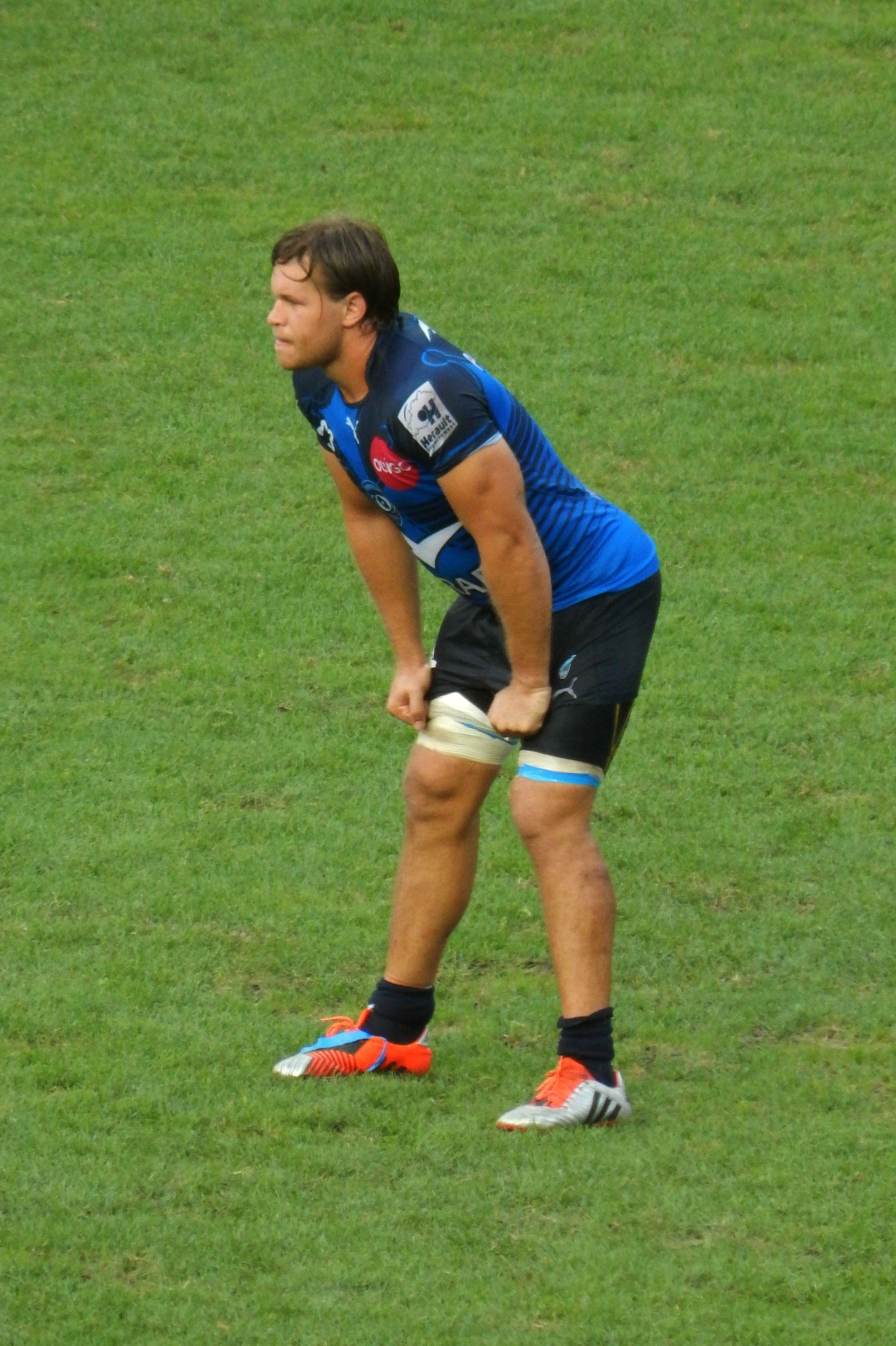
- Full name: Willem Andries Liebenberg
- Born: 31 August 1992 (age 34) Brackenfell, South Africa
- Height: 1.88 m (6 ft 2 in)
- Weight: 105 kg (16 st 7 lb; 231 lb)
- School: HTS Drostdy, Worcester
- University: University of Pretoria
- Notable relative: Hanro Liebenberg (brother)

Rugby union career
- Position: Flanker
- Current team: La Rochelle
Youth career
- 2009–2010: Boland Cavaliers
Amateur team(s)
| Years | Team | Apps | (Points) |
| 2012–present | UP Tuks | 17 | (45) |
Senior career
| Years | Team | Apps | (Points) |
| 2011–2015 | Blue Bulls | 37 | (65) |
| 2014 | Bulls | 1 | (0) |
| 2015–2018 | Montpellier | 57 | (15) |
| 2018 | → Béziers (loan) | 2 | (0) |
| 2018–2022 | La Rochelle | 80 | (60) |
- Correct as of 11 June 2022
International career
| Years | Team | Apps | (Points) |
| 2012 | South Africa U20 | 4 | (0) |
- Correct as of 11 May 2014

Willem Andries Liebenberg (born 31 August 1992) is a South African former rugby union player, who mainly played as a flanker for Blue Bulls then Top 14 sides Montpellier and La Rochelle.

== Career ==
=== Provincial rugby ===
He represented the Boland Cavaliers at the Under–18 Academy and Craven Week tournaments in 2009 and 2010 respectively, which led to his inclusion in the South African Under–18 High Performance Squad in 2010.

He also moved to the Blue Bulls where he played at Under–19 and Under–21 level. He made his debut for the senior team during the 2012 Vodacom Cup in a match against the Sharks XV.

He captained the UP Tuks side during the 2015 Varsity Cup and named in a Varsity Cup Dream Team at the conclusion of the tournament which played one match against the South Africa Under-20s in Stellenbosch.

=== 2012 Junior World Championship ===
Liebenberg was included in and named captain of the South Africa Under-20 squad for the 2012 IRB Junior World Championship. The team went on to win the tournament for the first time.

== Honours ==
=== Club ===
(France) La Rochelle

- European Rugby Champions Cup: 2021–2022
