= Joe Smith (rugby union) =

South African rugby union player (born 1991)

- Full name: Johan Smith
- Born: 2 December 1991 (age 34) Fochville, South Africa
- Height: 1.81 m (5 ft 11 1/2 in)
- Weight: 108 kg (238 lb; 17 st 0 lb)
- School: Hoër Volkskool Potchefstroom
- University: North-West University

Rugby union career
- Position: Prop / Hooker
Youth career
- 2009–2012: Leopards
Amateur team(s)
Years	Team	Apps	(Points)
2011	UJ	0	(0)
2014–2016	NWU Pukke	25	(5)
Senior career
Years	Team	Apps	(Points)
2012–2018	Leopards	50	(60)
2013–2015	Leopards XV	5	(5)
2018	Southern Kings	5	(0)
- Correct as of 18 June 2018

Johan Smith (born 2 December 1991) is a South African professional rugby union player who last played for the Leopards in the Currie Cup and in the Rugby Challenge. His regular position is prop, but he also played as a hooker earlier in his career.

== Rugby ==
Smith's first provincial call-up came at Under-18 level in 2009, when he represented the Leopards at the Craven Week tournament held in East London. In 2011, he was named in UJ's squad for the 2011 Varsity Cup competition, but he failed to make an appearance.

He made his first class debut for the Leopards in the 2012 Vodacom Cup competition, playing off the bench in their 28–31 defeat to the Falcons in Kempton Park, his solitary appearance in that competition. In the second half of 2012, Smith played for the Leopards U21s in the 2012 Under-21 Provincial Championship, where he was named in the matchday squad for all 12 of their matches, making 10 appearances.

He once again played in the Vodacom Cup competition in 2013, making three appearances off the bench. He scored his first senior try in the first of those, a 113–3 victory against the Limpopo Blue Bulls in Orkney. He made his Currie Cup debut in the same year, coming on as a replacement in their 2013 Currie Cup First Division match against the Boland Cavaliers. He made eight substitute appearances in total as the Leopards finished in third position on the log and losing their semi-final match 29–32 to the Eastern Province Kings after extra time.

In 2014, Smith represented the NWU Pukke in the 2014 Varsity Cup. He played in all seven of their round-robin matches, helping them top the log with six wins out of seven. He came on as a replacement in their 19–18 victory over NMMU Madibaz in the semi-final, but was an unused reserve in the final against UCT Ikey Tigers, in which NWU Pukke were leading 33–15 with five minutes to go, but dramatically lost 33–39 after conceding three late tries to their Cape Town opposition. He once again featured for the Leopards during the 2014 Currie Cup First Division tournament; he made his first senior start in their 21–29 defeat to the SWD Eagles and started all six of their matches in the competition. Despite topping the log after the round-robin stage, the Leopards lost 24–31 to the Falcons in the semi-finals to be eliminated from the competition.

Smith started all nine of NWU Pukke's matches in the 2015 Varsity Cup competition, again helping his side reach the final of the competition, where they lost once again, this time losing 33–63 to Bloemfontein-based side UFS Shimlas. He was named in a Varsity Cup Dream Team after the competition, starting the team's match against the South Africa Under-20s, which ended in a 24–31 loss for the students. He also played in the Leopards' final two matches of the 2015 Vodacom Cup season against Namibian side Welwitschias in Windhoek and against Western Province in Cape Town. He scored his first try in the Currie Cup competition during the opening round of the 2015 Currie Cup qualification tournament, scoring after 22 minutes to set his team on the way to a 45–17 victory. He was a member of the Leopards team that won the 2015 Currie Cup First Division. He featured in a total of thirteen matches during the 2015 Currie Cup qualification rounds and First Division proper and scored five tries for the side. He also started the final, where he helped the Leopards to a 44–20 victory over the SWD Eagles to win the competition for the first time in their history.

== Powerlifting ==
In addition to rugby union, Smith also competes in powerlifting. He became the IPF champion in the 105 kg weight category in 2014.
