= John-Roy Jenkinson =

South African rugby union player

- Born: 26 March 1991 (age 35) Worcester, South Africa
- Height: 1.78 m (5 ft 10 in)
- Weight: 122 kg (19 st 3 lb; 269 lb)
- School: Glenwood High School, Durban
- University: NWU Pukke

Rugby union career
- Position: Prop
- Current team: Griquas; Rugby ATL
Youth career
- 2004–2009: Sharks
- 2010–2011: Leopards
Amateur team(s)
Years	Team	Apps	(Points)
2011–2015	NWU Pukke	21	(10)
2016	Maties	5	(12)
Senior career
Years	Team	Apps	(Points)
2011–2015	Leopards	40	(15)
2013	→ Free State Cheetahs	2	(0)
2014–2015	Leopards XV	3	(5)
2016–2018	Blue Bulls	7	(0)
2017	Bulls	4	(0)
2017–2018	Blue Bulls XV	6	(0)
2018–2019	Munakata Sanix Blues	4	(0)
2020–	Griquas	7	(0)
2022–	Rugby ATL		
- Correct as of 12 April 2022
International career
Years	Team	Apps	(Points)
2011	South Africa Under-20	5	(0)
2012	South Africa Students	2	(5)
- Correct as of 25 July 2013

John-Roy Jenkinson (born 26 March 1991) is a South African rugby union player for Rugby ATL in Major League Rugby (MLR). He also plays for the Munakata Sanix Blues in the Japanese Top League. His regular position is prop.

== Career ==
=== Youth ===
He represented the Sharks at youth level and played for them in the 2004 Under-13 Craven Week and the 2007 Under-16 Grant Khomo Week tournaments. He played for a KwaZulu-Natal Country Districts team at the 2008 Academy Week and played for KwaZulu-Natal at the 2009 Under-18 Craven Week.

He then moved to Potchefstroom and played rugby for the Leopards U19 team in 2010 and the Leopards U21 team in the 2011 Under-21 Provincial Championship competitions.

=== Senior career ===
He made his first class debut for the Leopards in the 2011 Currie Cup Premier Division competition, coming on as a late substitute in their match against the Sharks. He made a further nine appearances the following season in the 2012 Currie Cup First Division.

In July 2013, he signed for the Free State Cheetahs on a loan deal.

He also signed for the Sharks on a three-month loan deal for the 2015 Currie Cup Premier Division, but returned to Potchefstroom without playing in any matches for the Sharks.

He was a member of the Leopards team that won the 2015 Currie Cup First Division. He featured in a total of thirteen matches during the 2015 Currie Cup qualification rounds and First Division proper and scored two tries for the side. He also started the final, where he helped the Leopards to a 44–20 victory over the SWD Eagles to win the competition for the first time in their history.

=== Varsity Cup rugby ===
He also played for the NWU Pukke in the 2011 Varsity Cup and 2012 Varsity Cup competitions. This also led to his inclusion in the South African Students team in 2012. He was named in a Varsity Cup Dream Team at the conclusion of the 2015 Varsity Cup tournament which played one match against the South Africa Under-20s in Stellenbosch.

=== Representative rugby ===
In 2011, he played for the South Africa Under-20 team in the 2011 IRB Junior World Championship.

== Honours ==
New England Free Jacks

- Major League Rugby Championship: 2024
