= Jan van der Merwe (rugby union) =

South African rugby union player

- Born: 31 August 1995 (age 31) Pretoria, South Africa
- Height: 1.82 m (5 ft 11 1/2 in)
- Weight: 110 kg (17 st 5 lb; 243 lb)
- School: Pretoria Boys High School
- University: University of Pretoria

Rugby union career
- Position: Hooker
Youth career
- 2014–2016: Blue Bulls
Amateur team(s)
Years	Team	Apps	(Points)
2015–2016	UP Tuks	3	(0)
Senior career
Years	Team	Apps	(Points)
2015	Blue Bulls	1	(0)
2016	Blue Bulls XV	7	(0)
2017–present	SWD Eagles	9	(10)
- Correct as of 14 April 2018
International career
Years	Team	Apps	(Points)
2015	South Africa Under-20	5	(5)
- Correct as of 14 April 2018

Jan van der Merwe (born 31 August 1995 in Pretoria, South Africa) is a South African rugby union player who most recently played for the SWD Eagles. His regular position is hooker.

== Career ==
Despite never earning a provincial call-up at high school level, Van der Merwe joined the Blue Bulls Academy after finishing high school and represented the Blue Bulls U19 side in the 2014 Under-19 Provincial Championship, starting eight matches and making three substitute appearances as they reached the final of the competition, where they were defeated 26–33 by Western Province U19.

He made his first class debut for the Blue Bulls on 6 March 2015, coming on as a late replacement in their 2015 Vodacom Cup match against the Falcons in Kempton Park, helping them to a 37–13 victory.

He also played for UP Tuks in the 2015 Varsity Cup competition, starting their match against UJ and playing off the bench on two occasions.

Despite initially not being named in a 37-man training squad for the South Africa national under-20 rugby union team, he did feature for them in a friendly match against a Varsity Cup Dream Team in April 2015. He came on as a first-half replacement and scored a try just after half-time in a 31–24 victory. He was also included in the squad that embarked on a two-match tour of Argentina. He came on as a replacement in their 25–22 victory over Argentina and started their second tour match a few days later, in which he scored two first-half tries in a 39–28 victory.

Upon the team's return, he was named in the final squad for the 2015 World Rugby Under 20 Championship. He started their opening match in Pool B of the competition and got South Africa's first points in the competition by scoring a try in a 33–5 win against hosts Italy. He played off the bench in their remaining two group stage fixtures, a 40–8 win against Samoa and a 46–13 win over Australia to help South Africa finish top of Pool B to qualify for the semi-finals with the best record pool stage of all the teams in the competition. Van der Merwe came on as a replacement in their semi-final match against England, but could not prevent them losing 20–28 to be eliminated from the competition by England for the second year in succession. He started their third-place play-off match against France, helping South Africa to a 31–18 win to secure third place in the competition.
