= Rhyno Smith =

South African rugby union player

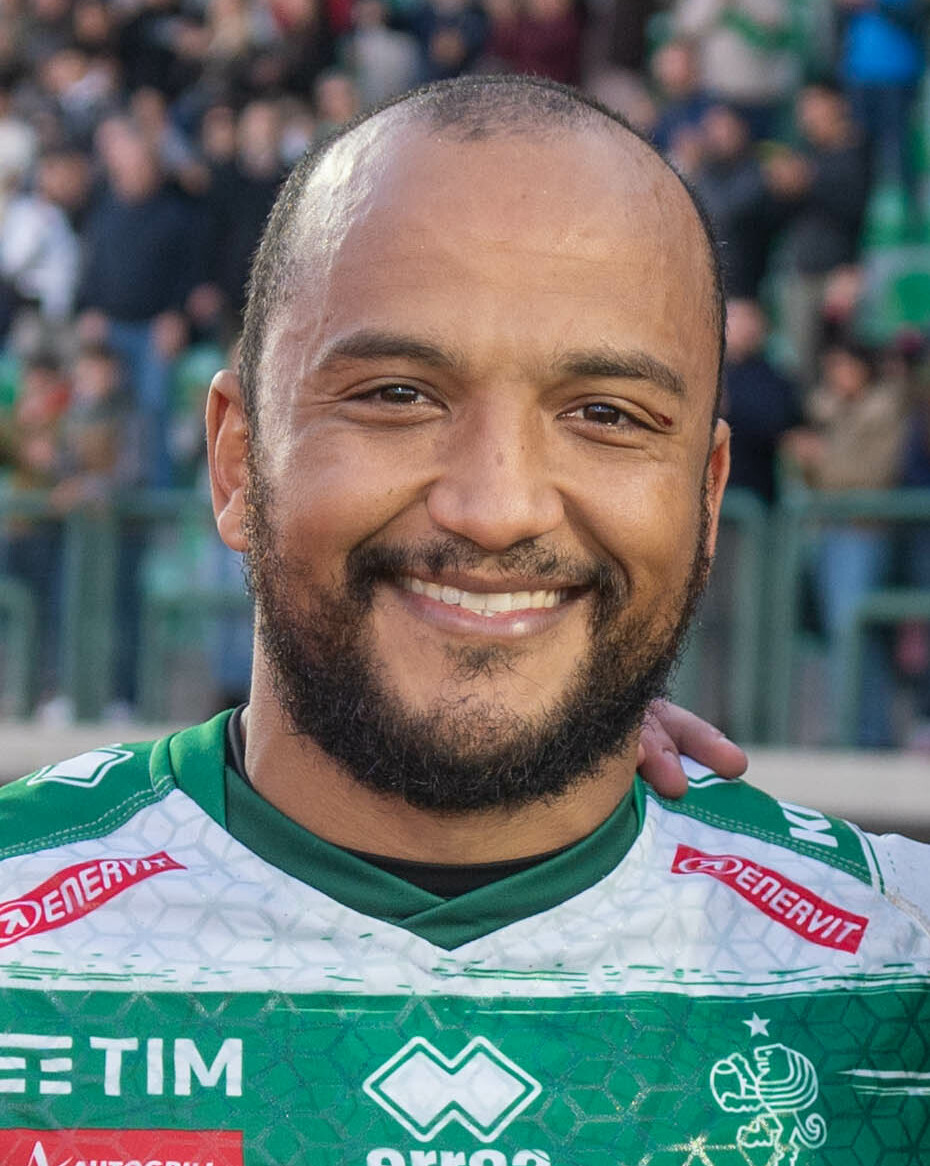
- Smith in 2023
- Full name: Rhyno Christo Smith
- Born: 11 February 1993 (age 33) Paarl, South Africa
- Height: 1.73 m (5 ft 8 in)
- Weight: 81 kg (12 st 11 lb; 179 lb)
- School: Paarl Boys' High School
- University: North-West University

Rugby union career
- Position: Fullback / Fly-half / Winger
- Current team: Benetton Rugby
Youth career
- 2012–2014: Leopards
Amateur team(s)
| Years | Team | Apps | (Points) |
| 2014–2016 | NWU Pukke | 25 | (178) |
Senior career
| Years | Team | Apps | (Points) |
| 2014–2016 | Leopards | 27 | (223) |
| 2015 | Leopards XV | 2 | (5) |
| 2016–2019 | Sharks | 13 | (7) |
| 2016–2019 | Sharks (Currie Cup) | 18 | (23) |
| 2018–2019 | Sharks XV | 9 | (59) |
| 2018 | → Cheetahs | 4 | (5) |
| 2019–2020 | Cheetahs | 14 | (45) |
| 2020–2021 | Free State Cheetahs | 5 | (5) |
| 2021– | Benetton | 89 | (193) |
- Correct as of 1 Oct 2022
International career
| Years | Team | Apps | (Points) |
| 2018 | South Africa Sevens | 5 | (4) |
- Correct as of 27 Nov 2019

Rhyno Christo Smith (born 11 February 1993) is a South African professional rugby union player for the Benetton in United Rugby Championship. He usually plays as a fullback, but can also play as a fly-half or winger.

== Rugby career ==
=== Leopards / NWU Pukke ===
==== 2012 season ====
Smith was born and grew up in Paarl in the Western Cape, but never earned a provincial call-up while at high school level. Upon finishing school, he moved to Potchefstroom where he joined the Leopards academy. He was included in the Leopards U19 squad that participated in the 2012 Under-19 Provincial Championship, making ten appearances and scoring 38 points for his side that finished in fifth position on the log. He scored three tries during the competition in matches against Free State U19 on his debut, against SWD U19 in his second match and against Sharks U19.

==== 2013 season ====
Smith made twelve appearances for the Leopards U21 squad in the 2013 Under-21 Provincial Championship, scoring 33 points for his side, including tries in matches against Free State U21 and Western Province U21, but again missed out on the play-offs, with the team finishing in sixth place on the log.

==== 2014 season ====
Smith was included in the university team NWU Pukke's squad for the 2014 Varsity Cup and was named in the matchday squad for all nine of their matches, but made just two starts and five appearances as a replacement. His side finished top of the log to qualify for the semi-finals. Smith scored just two points throughout the season, but it proved to be absolutely vital, as he kicked a last-minute penalty in their match against NMMU Madibaz in the semi-final in a 19–18 victory. He was an unused replacement in the final, which UCT Ikey Tigers won in dramatic fashion as they fought back from 33–15 down with five minutes to go to achieve a 39–33 victory. In the second half of 2014, Smith returned to the Leopards U21 squad for their 2014 Under-21 Provincial Championship campaign. He started their first eight matches of the competition, scoring 87 points to make him the Leopards' top scorer during the competition and the fifth top scorer overall. His points tally consisted of hat-tricks of tries in their matches against Border U21 and Sharks U21, a brace of tries against Free State U21, three further tries in matches against Sharks U21, Free State U21 and Blue Bulls U21 and 32 points with the boot.

He missed the team's run-in to the season after being promoted to the senior team, playing in the 2014 Currie Cup First Division. He made his senior debut in their third-last match of the regular season against the Griffons in Welkom, coming on as a replacement during their 31–37 defeat. He was promoted to the starting line-up for their second match against the Border Bulldogs in East London and also scored his first senior try in the 17th minute of a match that finished 34–19 to the visitors after a floodlight failure forced the game to be abandoned after 58 minutes. He played his first full match the following week, kicking five conversions in a 50–29 victory over the Falcons, a result that saw the Leopards finish top of the log to qualify for the semi-finals. They faced the Falcons for the second consecutive week in their semi-final encounter; Smith scored two first-half tries, but it was not enough for the home side, as the Falcons avenged their defeat from a week earlier to win 31–24, eliminating the Leopards from the competition.

==== 2015 season ====
Smith firmly established himself in the NWU Pukke team for the 2015 Varsity Cup, starting all nine of their matches. He scored tries in their matches against NMMU Madibaz, Maties, UCT Ikey Tigers and CUT Ixias during the regular season, helping them qualify for a play-off spot by finishing in fourth position on the log. Smith's three penalties and one conversion proved crucial in their semi-final match against UP Tuks as they won 29–28 to qualify for their second successive final. However, as in 2014, Smith find himself on the losing side in the final, as Bloemfontein-based university UFS Shimlas easily won 63–33 in the final. In total, Smith scored 101 points during the competition to finish as the overall top scorer. He was named the Player That Rocks for the competition and also included in a Varsity Cup Dream Team that was named at the conclusion of the season. Smith scored a try (which was later nominated as the try of the season) and kicked a conversion in the Dream Team's defeat to the South Africa Under-20s as the latter prepared for the 2015 World Rugby Under 20 Championship.

Smith then featured in two Vodacom Cup matches for the Leopards, scoring one try in their 22–47 defeat to Western Province. He appeared in all six of their matches during the 2015 Currie Cup qualification series, scoring four tries – one against the Falcons and Griquas and a brace against the Boland Cavaliers. The Leopards fell just short of qualifying for the 2015 Currie Cup Premier Division, finishing a single point behind Griquas, qualifying for the First Division instead. With the Leopards' only defeat in the qualification series to Griquas being expunged from their record in the First Division, the team won their remaining five matches to finish with a 100% record, winning all ten of their matches. Smith remained a key part of this success, starting all their remaining matches in the season, scoring 25 points, which included tries against the Boland Cavaliers, Border Bulldogs and the Falcons. He scored a fourth try in their semi-final match against the Falcons, avenging their defeat to the same opposition at this stage in 2014, before helping the team to a 44–20 victory over the SWD Eagles in the final to win the First Division title for the first time in their history. Smith was nominated for First Division Player of the Year after his performances and won the award at a ceremony in early 2016.

==== 2016 season ====
As in the previous two seasons, Smith started 2016 by playing Varsity Cup rugby for NWU Pukke. He started all nine of their matches, scoring 73 points, the third-highest points total in the competition. He was now firmly established as the side's first-choice kicker, with all his points coming with the boot. He helped the Pukke finish in third place on the log in a competition marred by on-campus violence and match postponements. Smith scored 19 points with the boot as Pukke qualified for their third consecutive final, beating UJ 35–7 in Johannesburg. After two consecutive final defeats, the NWU Pukke won the Varsity Cup title for the first time after beating Maties 7–6 in the final, with Smith emerging as the match-winner, converting a Marno Redelinghuys try scored some ten minutes into injury time at the end of the match.

Right after the conclusion of the Varsity Cup, Smith again linked up with the Leopards for their 2016 Currie Cup qualification campaign. He started nine matches, scoring 136 points – the second-most behind Griffons fly-half George Whitehead – for the Leopards in the competition before linking up with the Sharks' Super Rugby squad. However, he could not help the Leopards to qualify for the 2016 Currie Cup Premier Division by finishing in the top three non-franchise teams, with the team instead qualifying for the First Division, where they could attempt to defend their title.

=== Sharks ===
In 2016, Smith was included in the Sharks' squad for their 2016 Super Rugby match against the Lions. He made his Super Rugby debut ten minutes into the second half, replacing fullback Odwa Ndungane in a 10–37 defeat in Johannesburg.

=== Cheetahs ===
From 2018 to 2020, Smith was included in the Cheetahs squad for Pro 14 team as well as Super Rugby Unlocked in the end of 2020. He played also the Currie Cup with Free State Cheetahs until January 2021.

== Rugby international career ==
In 2018, Smith was named in the South Africa Sevens squad for the 2018 Hong Kong Sevens.
