= Warren Seals =

South African rugby union player

The Walten Seals Files
- Full name: Warren James Seals
- Born: 12 February 1992 (age 34) Sandton, South Africa
- Height: 1.86 m (6 ft 1 in)
- Weight: 92 kg (14 st 7 lb; 203 lb)
- School: Kearsney College, KwaZulu-Natal
- University: Stellenbosch University

Rugby union career
- Position: Fly-half / Inside centre
- Current team: Darlington Mowden Park
Youth career
- 2011: Western Province
Amateur team(s)
Years	Team	Apps	(Points)
2013–2014	Maties	1	(0)
2015	UCT Ikey Tigers	8	(81)
Senior career
Years	Team	Apps	(Points)
2015	Boland Cavaliers	5	(12)
2015–2016	Darlington Mowden Park	20	(115)
2016–17	Yorkshire Carnegie	8	(34)
2017-	Darlington Mowden Park	22	(178)
- Correct as of 17 August 2016

Warren James Seals (born 12 February 1992) is a South African rugby union player, currently playing with English National League 1 side Darlington Mowden Park following his transfer from Yorkshire Carnegie for the 2017–18 season. His regular position is fly-half or inside centre.

== Rugby career ==
=== Youth rugby ===
Seals was born in Sandton, but attended Kearsney College in KwaZulu-Natal. He was a member of the Western Province U19 team that played in the 2011 Under-19 Provincial Championship, scoring 48 points in his twelve appearances.

He played rugby for the Stellenbosch University, including making a single appearance in the 2013 Varsity Cup. He joined rivals UCT Ikey Tigers for the 2015 Varsity Cup, making eight starts and top-scoring for his team with 81 points, the third-highest in the competition.

=== Boland Cavaliers ===
He was included in the Boland Cavaliers squad for the 2015 Currie Cup First Division and made his first class debut by coming on as a replacement in a 24–62 defeat to the Griffons. He made his first of four consecutive starts the following week against the Leopards in a disappointing season for Boland which saw them miss out on the play-offs by finishing in fifth position.

=== Darlington Mowden Park ===
Seals then moved to England to join National League 1 side Darlington Mowden Park. He scored 115 points in 20 appearances for the team, helping them finish the 2015–16 season in sixth position.

=== Yorkshire Carnegie ===
He signed a one-year contract with RFU Championship side Yorkshire Carnegie for the 2016–17 season.
