= Jaco Visagie =

South African rugby union player

- Full name: Gerrit Jacobus Visagie
- Born: 8 July 1992 (age 34) Cape Town, South Africa
- Height: 1.88 m (6 ft 2 in)
- Weight: 105 kg (16 st 7 lb; 231 lb)
- School: Augsburg Agricultural Gymnasium, Clanwilliam
- University: University of Pretoria

Rugby union career
- Position: Hooker
- Current team: Lions / Golden Lions
Youth career
- 2008–2010: Boland Cavaliers
- 2011–2013: Blue Bulls
Amateur team(s)
Years	Team	Apps	(Points)
2013–2015	UP Tuks	14	(15)
Senior career
Years	Team	Apps	(Points)
2013–2019	Blue Bulls	38	(10)
2015–2020	Bulls	53	(15)
2016–2018	Blue Bulls XV	3	(5)
2018–2019	→ Gloucester	7	(15)
2019	Stade Toulousain	3	(0)
2020–	Lions	71	(35)
2020–	Golden Lions	48	(40)
- Correct as of 8 September 2025

Gerrit Jacobus Visagie (born 8 July 1992 in Cape Town) is a South African rugby union player for the Lions in the United Rugby Championship and the Golden Lions in the Currie Cup and also played for Stade Toulousain in the French Top 14. His regular position is hooker.

== Career ==
=== Youth ===
Visagie represented the Boland Under-16 side at the 2008 Grant Khomo Week and the Under-18 side at the 2010 Craven Week competition. In 2010, he played for the Boland U19 side in the 2010 Under-19 Provincial Championship competition, making two appearances.

He then relocated to Pretoria to join the Blue Bulls, where he played regular rugby for the Blue Bulls U19 side that made it to the final of the 2011 Under-19 Provincial Championship competition before losing out to the Golden Lions U19 side. He also played for the Blue Bulls U21 side in the 2012 and 2013 Under-21 competitions, winning the competition in the former season and ending as runners-up in the latter.

He also played Varsity Cup rugby for UP Tuks in their title-winning 2013 season, as well as in 2014. He was initially named in a Varsity Cup Dream Team at the conclusion of the 2015 Varsity Cup tournament, but withdrew and was replaced by Elandré Huggett.

=== Blue Bulls ===
Visagie's senior debut came during the 2013 Vodacom Cup competition, coming on as a substitute against the Pumas. He made a further two appearances in that competition. He also made his Currie Cup during the same season, when he came on as a substitute against the Golden Lions at Ellis Park Stadium, Johannesburg.

His first start in a first class match came in the Blue Bulls' 2014 Vodacom Cup match against the Pumas.

He was also included in the Bulls training squad prior to the 2014 Super Rugby season, but wasn't included in the final squad.

=== Gloucester Rugby ===
In November 2018, he joined Gloucester on loan until January 2019. He made seven appearances during this spell, scoring three tries.
