= John-Hubert Meyer =

South African rugby union player

- Born: 19 September 1993 (age 33) Cape Town, South Africa
- Height: 1.89 m (6 ft 2 1/2 in)
- Weight: 119 kg (18 st 10 lb; 262 lb)
- School: Paul Roos Gymnasium, Stellenbosch
- University: Stellenbosch University / University of KwaZulu-Natal

Rugby union career
- Position: Prop
- Current team: Béziers
Youth career
- 2012: Sharks
- 2014: Western Province
Amateur team(s)
Years	Team	Apps	(Points)
2015	Maties	6	(5)
2016	UKZN Impi	5	(5)
Senior career
Years	Team	Apps	(Points)
2016–2019	Sharks XV	13	(5)
2016–2021	Sharks (Currie Cup)	27	(10)
2017–2021	Sharks	28	(0)
2021–	Béziers		
- Correct as of 13 September 2021

John-Hubert Meyer (born 19 September 1993) is a South African rugby union player for the Sharks in Super Rugby and in the Currie Cup and the Sharks XV in the Rugby Challenge. He can play as a loosehead or tighthead prop.

== Rugby career ==
=== 2012 : Sharks Under-19 ===
Meyer was born in Cape Town and attended Paul Roos Gymnasium in nearby Stellenbosch. He never earned a provincial call-up for Western Province during his school career and moved to Durban to join the Sharks after finishing school. He was named on the bench for all thirteen of the Sharks U19's matches during the 2012 Under-19 Provincial Championship, scoring a try in their 46–3 victory over the SWD U19s and two tries in their final match of the regular season, a 47–45 victory over the Leopards U19s. The Sharks finished in third place to qualify for the semi-finals, where they lost to the Blue Bulls U19s.

=== 2014–2015 : Western Province Under-21 and Maties ===
Meyer moved back to Cape Town to join the Western Province U21 team for their Under-21 Provincial Championship season. He made six starts and four appearances as a replacement during the regular season, scoring a try in their 39–18 victory over Free State U21 to help his side top the log. He started their 29–22 victory over the same opposition in their semi-final and in the final, where he finished on the winning side, as Western Province beat the Blue Bulls 33–26 in Cape Town.

At the start of 2015, Meyer represented the Stellenbosch University's rugby team Maties in the Varsity Cup competition. He played in six of their seven matches, scoring a try in their narrow defeat to eventual champions UFS Shimlas, but could not help Maties into the semi-finals, with the three-time champions finishing in fifth place.

=== 2016–present : Sharks and UKZN Impi ===
Meyer again made the move to Durban for the 2016 season. He started the season with five appearances in the Varsity Shield competition for the KwaZulu-Natal university side UKZN Impi. He scored a try for them in their 72–8 victory over TUT Vikings His team won seven of their eight matches and would have finished joint-top of the log with Wits, but they had 12 points deducted for fielding an ineligible player, therefore missing out on the title play-offs and a shot at promotion to the Varsity Cup.

Meyer was included in the Sharks XV squad for the 2016 Currie Cup qualification series and he made his first class debut at the end of April 2016, coming on as a replacement in their 48–18 victory over Namibian side the Welwitschias in Umlazi. He made a further four appearances for the team as they finished in tenth place on the log. He was also included in the Sharks squad for the Currie Cup Premier Division, and he made his debut at that level in a 46–24 victory over Griquas in Round Two of the competition. He remained in the matchday squad for the remainder of the competition, making a further six appearances, which included his first senior start in their 53–0 victory over the Eastern Province Kings. Despite being in the top two on the log for the majority of the series, a defeat to the Golden Lions in the final round of the season saw the Sharks drop out of the top four altogether, finishing in fifth place and missing out on a semi-final spot.

At the end of October 2016, Meyer was included in the Sharks Super Rugby squad for the 2017 season.
