= Zee Mkhabela =

South African rugby union player

- Full name: Mthokozisi Cyprial Mkhabela
- Born: 15 October 1994 (age 32) Empangeni, South Africa
- Height: 1.67 m (5 ft 5 1/2 in)
- Weight: 75 kg (11 st 11 lb; 165 lb)
- School: Glenwood High School, Durban

Rugby union career
- Position: Scrum-half
- Current team: Sharks / Sharks (Currie Cup)
Youth career
- 2010–2012: Sharks
- 2013–2015: Free State Cheetahs
Amateur team(s)
Years	Team	Apps	(Points)
2015–2016	UFS Shimlas	11	(0)
Senior career
Years	Team	Apps	(Points)
2015–2017	Free State Cheetahs	14	(15)
2016–2018	Free State XV	7	(5)
2017–2018	Cheetahs	10	(0)
2019	Sharks XV	5	(5)
2019	Sharks	2	(0)
2020	Cheetahs	1	(0)
2021–2022	Valladolid	8	(5)
2022–	Sharks (Currie Cup)	2	(0)
2022–	Sharks		
- Correct as of 16 September 2022
International career
Years	Team	Apps	(Points)
2011	South Africa Schools Academy	1	(0)
2014	South Africa Under-20	1	(0)
- Correct as of 22 April 2018

Mthokozisi Cyprial "Zee" Mkhabela (born 15 October 1994) is a South African rugby union player for the Sharks in the Super Rugby and the Sharks XV in the Rugby Challenge. His regular position is scrum-half.

He signed for Spanish Club Valladoid for the 21/22 season, having previously played for his Local side College Rovers.

== Career ==
=== KwaZulu-Natal (2010–12) ===
In 2010, Mkhabela was called up to represent KwaZulu-Natal at the Under-16 Grant Khomo Week tournament held in Upington. The following year, he was selected in a South African Academy team that played against a France Under-18 team in Durban and in 2012, he represented KwaZulu-Natal at the premier South African schools competition, the Under-18 Craven Week.

=== Free State Cheetahs / UFS Shimlas / South Africa Under-20 (2013–) ===
After high school, Mkhabela moved to Bloemfontein to join the Free State Cheetahs prior to the 2013 season. He made ten appearances for the Free State U19 team, scoring a try in their match against the Blue Bulls U19s.

In 2014, Mkhabela was selected for the South Africa Under-20 squad that participated in the 2014 IRB Junior World Championship in New Zealand. He started the first match of the competition, a 61–5 victory over Scotland, but was an unused replacement in their other two pool stage matches against New Zealand and Samoa. He was again named on the bench for their semi-final win over New Zealand without getting any game time, as well as in the final against England, where South Africa suffered a 20–21 defeat.

Mkhabela got more game time upon his return to domestic action, playing eleven times in the Free State U21s' 2014 Under-21 Provincial Championship season, helping them qualify for the semi-finals, where they lost to eventual losing finalists Western Province U21.

In 2015, Mkhabela was included in the UFS Shimlas squad for the 2015 Varsity Cup. He made seven appearances for the Shimlas pool stages of the tournament as Shimlas finished second on the log, but missed out on the play-offs as Shimlas won the competition for the first time, beating NWU Pukke 63–33 in the final. After the tournament, Mkhabela was named as the replacement scrum-half in a Varsity Cup Dream Team that played a match against the 2015 South African Under-20 squad, with the latter winning the match 31–24.

Mkhabela was named in the Free State Cheetahs' squad for the 2015 Currie Cup Premier Division and was named on the bench for their opening match of the competition against the Blue Bulls.
