= Dillon Smit =

South African rugby union player

- Born: 11 December 1992 (age 33) Bethal, South Africa
- Height: 1.75 m (5 ft 9 in)
- Weight: 80 kg (12 st 8 lb; 176 lb)
- School: HTS Middelburg
- University: North-West University

Rugby union career
- Position: Scrum-half / Winger
- Current team: Houston SaberCats
Youth career
- 2008–2010: Pumas
- 2012–2013: Border Bulldogs
Amateur team(s)
Years	Team	Apps	(Points)
2014	NWU Pukke	17	(40)
Senior career
Years	Team	Apps	(Points)
2013	Border Bulldogs	5	(0)
2014–2015	Leopards XV	2	(0)
2014–2015	Leopards	15	(40)
2015–2021	Lions	27	(0)
2016–2019	Golden Lions XV	15	(17)
2016–2021	Golden Lions	24	(15)
2022–	Houston SaberCats	23	(15)
- Correct as of 19 June 2022

Dillon Smit (born 11 December 1992 in Bethal, South Africa) is a South African rugby union player for the Houston SaberCats in Major League Rugby (MLR). He previously played for the Lions in Super Rugby, the Golden Lions in the Currie Cup and the Golden Lions XV in the Rugby Challenge. His regular position is scrum-half, but he can also play as a winger.

== Career ==
=== Youth (Pumas) ===
Smit went to Hoërskool Middelburg, which is in the Pumas Rugby Union's catchment area. He represented Pumas youth teams at the Under-16 Grant Khomo Week in 2008 and at the premier high school rugby union competition in South Africa, the Under-18 Craven Week in both 2009 and 2010.

=== Border Bulldogs ===
After high school, Smit moved to East London where he joined the Border Bulldogs. He was named in their senior squad for the 2012 Vodacom Cup competition, but failed to make a matchday squad. In the second half of the season, he made ten appearances for the Border U21 side during the 2012 Under-21 Provincial Championship and scored four tries, which included a brace in their match against the Free State U21s. His side finished bottom of Group A and had to play in a relegation play-off against the Group B winners, Eastern Province U21. Smit played the full 80 minutes as Border ran out 21–15 winners to retain their Group A status.

He was once again named in their senior squad for the 2013 Vodacom Cup competition and this time he did get some playing time; he made his first class debut in their opening match of the season, coming on as a second-half replacement in their 6–72 loss to the Sharks XV in Durban. He also played off the bench in their matches against Argentine side Pampas XV in Stellenbosch and Western Province in Paarl. He was also included in their squad for the 2013 Currie Cup First Division competition and made his debut in the Currie Cup in a 26–22 victory over the Leopards in Potchefstroom. His first appearance in a home match came in their next game against eventual champions, the Eastern Province Kings in a 20–38 loss. Smit also featured in nine matches for a Border U21 side that lost all twelve of their matches during the 2013 Under-21 Provincial Championship Group A, but he scored a crucial try in their 23–21 victory against the Eastern Province U21s in the relegation play-off.

He left the Border Bulldogs at the end of 2013, having made five appearances, all of them as a replacement.

=== Leopards / NWU Pukke ===
He moved to Potchefstroom for the 2014 season and scored two tries in eight substitute appearances for their university side, the NWU Pukke, in the 2014 Varsity Cup, helping his side all the way to the final. He kicked a conversion and a penalty in the final against UCT Ikey Tigers, but it wasn't enough as UCT won the title in dramatic fashion, fighting back from 33–15 down with five minutes to go to achieve a 39–33 victory. After the Varsity Cup, he also made a single appearance off the bench for the Leopards in the 2014 Vodacom Cup competition against Griquas in an 8–32 defeat in Klerksdorp.

For 2014, the South African Rugby Union introduced a 2014 Currie Cup qualification competition, with the winner earning a spot in the 2014 Currie Cup Premier Division. Smit was included in the Leopards' squad for this competition and made his first senior start in their opening match of the competition, a 51–23 victory over the SWD Eagles. He retained the number nine jersey for the rest of the competition, starting in all six of the matches. He scored his first career try in the Leopards' 70–25 win over the Griffons, followed that up by two tries in their next match, a 55–23 win over the Boland Cavaliers, and also scoring one try in the Leopards' final match of the tournament, a 103–15 demolition of his former side, the Border Bulldogs. The Leopards finished second in the competition, with a 32–33 defeat to Griquas in Round Three condemning them to finish behind the men from Kimberley and therefore progressing to the 2015 Currie Cup First Division. Smit made three starts during the group stages of the competition, scoring a brace of tries in their final match against the Falcons in a 50–29 victory as the Leopards topped the log. He also started their semi-final match against the Falcons, with the team from the East Rand running out surprise 31–24 winners to eliminate the Leopards from the competition.

He again started off the 2015 season playing Varsity Cup rugby for the NWU Pukke. He started all nine their matches and scored five tries as they matched their 2014 performance, making it all the way to the final. However, they once again finished as runners-up, this time losing 33–63 to the Bloemfontein-based UFS Shimlas. Smit's performances didn't go unnoticed and he was named in a Varsity Cup Dream Team after the competition. He played in the team's match against the South Africa Under-20 side, scoring a second-half try in a 24–31 loss for the students. He also played in the Leopards' final match of the 2015 Vodacom Cup season against Western Province in Cape Town.

=== Lions ===
In May 2015, Smit was named on the bench for the Lions' Super Rugby match against the Waratahs in Johannesburg.
