= Dayan van der Westhuizen =

South African rugby union player

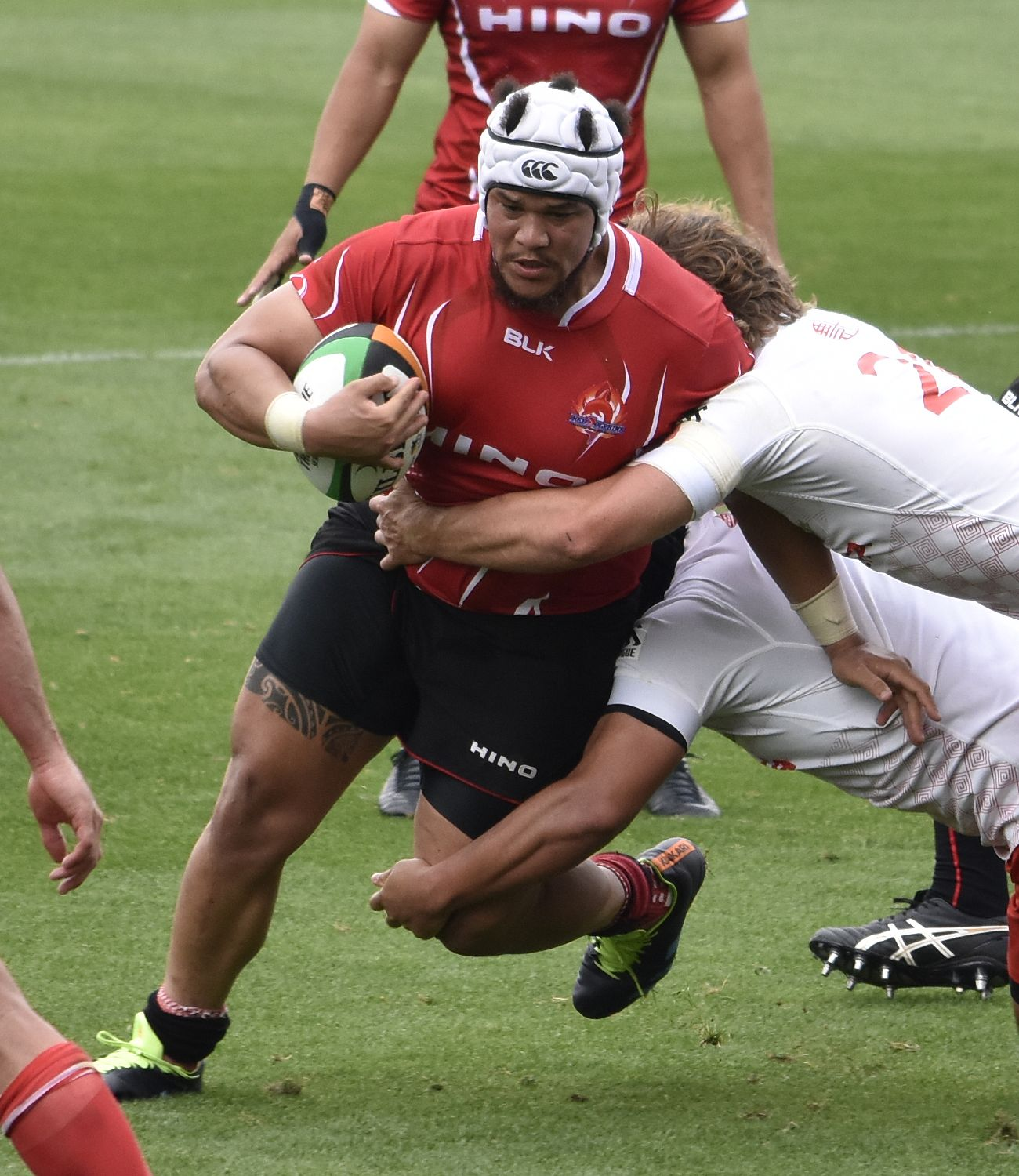
- Full name: Dayan Leslie van der Westhuizen
- Born: 5 April 1994 (age 32) Wellington, South Africa
- Height: 1.81 m (5 ft 11 1/2 in)
- Weight: 118 kg (260 lb; 18 st 8 lb)
- School: Hoërskool Centurion, Centurion

Rugby union career
- Position: Tighthead prop
- Current team: Bulls / Blue Bulls / Blue Bulls XV
Youth career
- 2010: Boland Cavaliers
- 2011–2015: Blue Bulls
Amateur team(s)
Years	Team	Apps	(Points)
2015	UP Tuks	4	(10)
Senior career
Years	Team	Apps	(Points)
2015–2020	Blue Bulls	25	(20)
2016	Blue Bulls XV	5	(0)
2017–2018	Southern Kings	14	(0)
2019	Bulls	5	(0)
2021–2023	Hino Red Dolphins	16	(10)
- Correct as of 20 February 2021
International career
Years	Team	Apps	(Points)
2012	South Africa Schools	3	(5)
2014	South Africa Under-20	5	(0)
- Correct as of 13 April 2018

Dayan Leslie van der Westhuizen (born 5 April 1994 in Wellington, South Africa) is a South African rugby union player for the Bulls in Super Rugby, the Blue Bulls in the Currie Cup and the Blue Bulls XV in the Rugby Challenge. His regular position is tighthead prop.

== Career ==
=== Boland ===
Having grown up in Wellington in the Western Cape province in South Africa, Van der Westhuizen was selected to represent Border at the annual Under-16 Grant Khomo Week competition held in Upington, where he scored a try in their match against the Pumas.

=== Blue Bulls / Bulls ===
However, he moved to Gauteng in 2011, where he enrolled at Hoërskool Centurion and represented Pretoria-based side the Blue Bulls in the Under-18 Craven Week competitions in 2011 and 2012. In 2012, he was called up to represent a South African Schools side and he played in three matches for them – against France, Wales and England. He scored a try in the first of those three matches to help South Africa achieve a 17–7 victory over their French counterparts.

After finishing high school, Van der Westhuizen remained at the Blue Bulls. He played in nine matches of the Blue Bulls U19 side's 2013 Under-19 Provincial Championship season; the seven of those came during the regular season, during which the Blue Bulls won all twelve of their matches to top the log. Van der Westhuizen also scored his first try at this level in their match against Western Province U19 in a 46–16 victory, and a second in a win over the Free State U19s. He was named in the starting line-up for the final against the Golden Lions U19s, a match which the Blue Bulls won 35–23 to secure the championship.

In 2014, Van der Westhuizen was included in the South Africa Under-20 squad that participated in the 2014 IRB Junior World Championship held in New Zealand. He played off the bench in their opening match against Scotland before making his first start for the Under-20s in a 33–24 victory against hosts and four-time winners New Zealand. He played off the bench once again for their final pool match, a 21–8 victory over Samoa as South Africa finished top of the group to set up a rematch with New Zealand in the semi-finals. Van der Westhuizen started the semi-final and helped South Africa secure their fourth consecutive victory over New Zealand at this level, winning 32–25. He made his fifth appearance – and third start – of the tournament in the final, but could not prevent South Africa finishing on the losing side this time, with England winning the championship for the second consecutive year with a 21–20 victory over South Africa.

Van der Westhuizen returned to domestic action a month after the Junior World Championship, making ten appearances for the Blue Bulls U21s during the 2014 Under-21 Provincial Championship and scoring a try against the Free State U21 team as they reached the final of the competition, with Van der Westhuizen coming on as a second-half replacement to help the Blue Bulls win the title by beating Western Province U21 in the final.

In 2015, he was included in the Bulls' squad for the 2015 Super Rugby season and was named on the bench for the side's season opener against the Stormers. He didn't make an appearance for them, instead playing for UP Tuks in the 2015 Varsity Cup competition. He was named in a Varsity Cup Dream Team at the conclusion of the tournament which played one match against the South Africa Under-20s in Stellenbosch.
