= Niel Marais =

South African rugby union player

- Full name: Daniel Rudolf Marais
- Born: 21 January 1992 (age 34) Bloemfontein, South Africa
- Height: 1.81 m (5 ft 11 1/2 in)
- Weight: 97 kg (15 st 4 lb; 214 lb)
- School: Grey College, Bloemfontein
- University: University of the Free State

Rugby union career
- Position: Centre / Fullback / Fly-half
Youth career
- 2005–2013: Free State Cheetahs
Amateur team(s)
Years	Team	Apps	(Points)
2015	UFS Shimlas	8	(63)
Senior career
Years	Team	Apps	(Points)
2013–2016	Free State XV	19	(92)
2014	→ Griquas	1	(0)
2015–2017	Free State Cheetahs	15	(145)
2015–2018	Cheetahs	39	(213)
2018	Yamaha Júbilo	2	(2)
2019–2020	Aurillac	2	(9)
2020–2021	Pumas	5	(12)
- Correct as of 12 January 2022

Daniel Rudolf Marais (born 21 January 1992, in Bloemfontein) is a South African rugby union player for Yamaha Júbilo in the Top League in Japan. He usually plays as a centre, but can also play as a fly-half or fullback.

== Career ==
=== Youth ===
Marais first represented the Free State in 2005, when he was part of their squad for the 2005 Under-13 Craven Week competition. He represented the Free State U19 side (playing mainly as a fullback) in the Under-19 Provincial Championship competitions in 2010 and 2011, scoring 124 points in the latter competition to finish third in the scoring charts. He advanced to the Free State U21 side, playing the majority of matches for them during the 2012 and 2013 seasons, with 2013 also seeing him starting to play mainly as a centre.

=== Free State Cheetahs ===
He was included in the Free State XV squad for the 2013 Vodacom Cup competition and made his senior debut when he started the opening match of the season, a 31–8 victory over the SWD Eagles in George. He made a total of six appearances during the competition.

He returned to Vodacom Cup action in 2014, captaining the side and scoring 41 points in his six starts. His first try in first class rugby came in their opening day match against the SWD Eagles, with Marais adding another 10 points with the boot.

=== Griquas ===
In May 2014, he joined Griquas on a two-month deal for the duration of the 2014 Currie Cup qualification series.
