= Marno Redelinghuys =

South African rugby union player

- Born: 6 January 1993 (age 33) Klerksdorp, South Africa
- Height: 1.96 m (6 ft 5 in)
- Weight: 117 kg (258 lb)
- School: Hoërskool Schoonspruit
- University: North-West University / Life University

Rugby union career
- Position: Flanker / Lock / No. 8
- Current team: Houston SaberCats
Amateur team(s)
Years	Team	Apps	(Points)
2014–2017	NWU Pukke		
2018	Maties		
2020-2022	Life University		
Senior career
Years	Team	Apps	(Points)
2015	Leopards XV	1	(0)
2015–2017	Leopards	37	(20)
2018–2019	Western Province	13	(10)
2019	Stormers	1	(0)
2020-2021	Rugby ATL	19	(10)
2022–present	Houston SaberCats	34	(5)
- Correct as of 3 July 2024

Marno Redelinghuys (born 6 January 1993) is a South African rugby union player contracted in North America with the Houston Sabercats. His regular position is flanker. Redelinghuys was born in Klerksdorp in the North West province of South Africa and started his professional career at the Leopards rugby union, where he played Currie Cup, Vodacom Cup and SuperSport Rugby Challenge. Marno played for NWU Pukke from 2014 to 2017 in the Varsity Cup and joined Maties in 2018. After representing Maties in the 2018 Varsity Cup final, Redelinghuys moved to Cape Town to join Western Province in the Rugby Challenge and played for the Stormers in the Super Rugby competition.

Redelinghuys moved to the U.S. in December 2019 and participated in the Major League Rugby (MLR) competition from 2020 to 2024 with Rugby ATL and the Houston Sabercats. He also represented Life University, for 3 season in the American Rugby Premiership (APR).
