= Pote Human =

Former South African rugby union player/current coach

- Full name: Gerhard Human
- Born: 1 November 1959 (age 67)

Rugby union career
- Position: Eighth man
Senior career
Years	Team	Apps	(Points)
	Eastern Province	116	
	Free State	84	
International career
Years	Team	Apps	(Points)
1977	South Africa Schools		
Coaching career
- Years: Team
- 1996–1997: Griffons
- 2005–2006: Blue Bulls
- 2005–2008: Bulls (assistant)
- 2008–2010: Ricoh Black Rams (assistant)
- 2011: UP Tuks (assistant)
- 2012–2013: Griquas
- 2013–2017: UP Tuks
- 2016: Blue Bulls U21
- 2017–2018: Bulls / Blue Bulls (assistant)
- 2018-2020: Blue Bulls
- 2019–2020: Bulls
- 2021–Present: Houston SaberCats

Gerhard 'Pote' Human (born 1 November 1959) is a South African rugby union coach. He currently serves as head coach of the Houston SaberCats of Major League Rugby (MLR), and is the former head coach of the Bulls in Super Rugby and the Blue Bulls in the Currie Cup. As a player, Human was an eighth man. After playing at the Craven Week and for the South Africa Schools team, he went on to have a first class career where he made 116 appearances for Eastern Province and 84 for the Free State.

== Coaching ==
After finishing playing, Human became a coach. He was the head coach of the Griffons in 1996 and 1997, before moving on to UFS Shimlas and the Blue Bulls. He was the head coach of the Blue Bulls team that drew the 2006 Currie Cup final 28–28 with the Free State Cheetahs, and an assistant coach to Heyneke Meyer for the Bulls team that won the 2007 Super 14 competition.

He was the assistant to Todd Louden at the Ricoh Black Rams in Japan in 2008 and 2009, helping them win promotion from the Top East League in his first season and avoiding relegation in the second.

He returned to South Africa to coach the forwards at UP Tuks in 2011 before joining Kimberley-based side Griquas for the 2012 season. After two season at Griquas, Human returned to Pretoria as the head coach for Varsity Cup side UP Tuks, as well as coaching junior teams at the Blue Bulls, taking charge of their Rugby Challenge side in 2017 and being appointed as the Currie Cup team's head coach in 2018.

After Heyneke Meyer was hired as Director of Rugby for the Houston SaberCats in July 2021, it was announced that Human would join the club as head coach on September 6, 2021.
