= Tyler Paul =

Japan international rugby union player

- Full name: Tyler Warne Paul
- Born: 20 January 1995 (age 31) Duiwelskloof, South Africa
- Height: 1.94 m (6 ft 4 1/2 in)
- Weight: 110 kg (240 lb; 17 st 5 lb)
- School: St. Andrew's College, Grahamstown
- University: Nelson Mandela Metropolitan University

Rugby union career
- Position: Flanker / Lock / Number 8
- Current team: Kubota Spears
Youth career
- 2013: Eastern Province Country Districts
- 2013: Eastern Province U19
Amateur team(s)
Years	Team	Apps	(Points)
2015	NMMU Madibaz	10	(33)
Senior career
Years	Team	Apps	(Points)
2014–2017	Eastern Province Kings	4	(0)
2017	Southern Kings	15	(5)
2017–2018	Sharks (Currie Cup)	22	(10)
2018–2020	Sharks	30	(10)
2019	Sharks XV	2	(0)
2021–2022	NTT Red Hurricanes	4	(0)
2022-2024	Urayasu D-Rocks	24	(35)
2024–	Kubota Spears	34	(45)
- Correct as of 21 February 2021
International career
Years	Team	Apps	(Points)
2025–	Japan	3	

Tyler Warne Paul (タイラー・ポール, Taira Pōru; born 20 January 1995) is a rugby union player for URAYASU D-Rocks in Japan Rugby League One. Born in South Africa, he represents Japan at international level after qualifying on residency grounds.

He can play as a lock or a flanker.

== Career ==
=== Youth ===
In 2013, Paul was named in the Eastern Province Country Districts' side for the 2013 Under-18 Craven Week competition. He progressed to the Eastern Province U19 side during the same year and started seven matches for the team during the 2013 Under-19 Provincial Championship. He also started in the final, where the EP Kings beat the Falcons U19 side 56–40 in Nelspruit to clinch the Division B trophy. He also played in their promotion/relegation play-off against near-neighbours Border U19, which the Kings won 27–20 to win promotion to Division A for 2014.

At the end-of-season awards ceremony, Paul was voted as the EP Kings' U19 Player of the Year for 2013.

=== Eastern Province Kings ===
His senior debut came during the 2014 Vodacom Cup competition. He came on as a substitute in the Eastern Province Kings' 31–3 defeat to the Free State XV in Cradock. He made a further two appearances, against the SWD Eagles in George and against the Boland Cavaliers in Port Elizabeth.

== International career ==
=== South Africa ===
In March 2015, Paul was named in an extended South Africa Under-20 training group as part of their preparation for the 2015 World Rugby Under 20 Championship.

=== Japan ===
On October 25, 2025, he earned his first cap for the Japan national team as a substitute during the Lipovitan D Challenge Cup 2025 match against Australia.
