= Ian Groenewald =

South African rugby union player

- Full name: John Adriaan Groenewald
- Born: 7 November 1992 (age 34) Middelburg, South Africa
- Height: 1.98 m (6 ft 6 in)
- Weight: 113 kg (249 lb)
- School: Nico Malan High School, Humansdorp
- University: University of Stellenbosch

Rugby union career
- Position: Lock
- Current team: Griquas
Amateur team(s)
Years	Team	Apps	(Points)
2014–2017	Maties		
Senior career
Years	Team	Apps	(Points)
2014	Western Province	2	(0)
2018–2019	Verona	19	(0)
2019–present	Griquas	13	(0)
- Correct as of 3 September 2019

John Adriaan 'Ian' Groenewald (born 7 November 1992) is a South African rugby union player for Griquas in the Currie Cup and the Rugby Challenge. His regular position is lock.

He made his Currie Cup debut for Griquas in July 2019, starting their opening match of the 2019 season against the Sharks at lock.
