= Johan Deysel =

Namibia international rugby union player

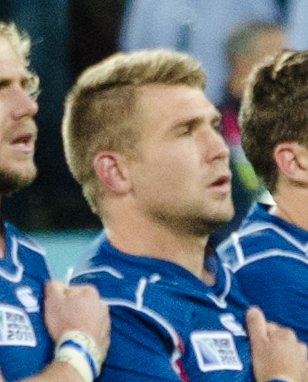
- Deysel representing Namibia during the Rugby World Cup
- Born: 26 September 1991 (age 35) Windhoek, Namibia
- Height: 1.84 m (6 ft 0 in)
- Weight: 106 kg (234 lb; 16 st 10 lb)
- School: Windhoek High School
- University: North-West University

Rugby union career
- Position: Centre
Senior career
Years	Team	Apps	(Points)
2013–2016	NWU Pukke	18	(20)
2014–2015	Leopards XV	6	(5)
2014–2016	Leopards	22	(146)
2017–2018	Sharks	4	(5)
2017–2018	Sharks XV	8	(7)
2018	Sharks	3	(5)
2018–2023	Colomiers	74	(45)
- Correct as of 4 August 2023
International career
Years	Team	Apps	(Points)
2013–	Namibia	32	(55)
- Correct as of 4 August 2023

Johan Deysel (born 26 September 1991) is a Namibian professional rugby union player who plays as a centre for Pro D2 club Colomiers and captains the Namibia national team.

== Early life ==
Deysel was born in Windhoek, Namibia. At high school level, he represented Namibia at South African youth weeks, playing at the 2008 Under-18 Academy Week held in George and at the 2009 Under-18 Craven Week held in East London.

After high school, he moved to South Africa to enroll at the Potchefstroom Campus of the North-West University. He joined the Potchefstroom-based Leopards rugby union and represented them in the Under-21 Provincial Championship in 2011 and 2012, as well as playing for university side NWU Pukke in the Varsity Cup competition.

== Club career ==
=== Leopards ===
He made his first class debut during the 2014 Vodacom Cup competition, playing off the bench in their 16–18 defeat to the Golden Lions. He again came on as a replacement in their match against the Limpopo Blue Bulls a week later and scored his first senior try in that match, scoring in the 48th minute of a 71–10 victory. He made further appearances as a replacement in their matches against the Falcons and the Blue Bulls as the Leopards missed out on a quarter final spot by finishing in fifth spot on the Northern Section log.

Deysel made his debut in the second tier of the Currie Cup competition later in the same year. He came on as a replacement in the Leopards' Currie Cup First Division match against the SWD Eagles in George, as well as in their next match at home against the Boland Cavaliers. Despite only coming on eight minutes after half-time, Deysel managed to score two tries to help the Leopards to a 54–32 victory over the team from the Western Cape. He was handed his first senior start in their next match against the Griffons in Welkom and scored another try for his side just after half-time in a 31–37 defeat. Another start and another try followed in their 34–19 win over the Border Bulldogs a week later and he also started their final match of the regular season against the Falcons. He also started their semi-final match – facing the Falcons for the second week in a row – but could not prevent his side losing 24–31 to be eliminated from the competition.

At the start of 2015, Deysel was a key member of the NWU Pukke side that reached the final of the 2016 Varsity Cup competition, starting all nine of their matches and scoring a try in their match against the UCT Ikey Tigers and a brace against UFS Shimlas in their final match of the regular season. He also scored a try against the UFS Shimlas in the final, but it proved futile as the team from Bloemfontein won 63–33 to be crowned Varsity Cup champions. In 2016, his try in the final was named the 2015 Try of the Year in the South African Rugby Union's annual awards.

After the Varsity Cup, Deysel made two appearances for the Leopards in the 2015 Vodacom Cup competition, before starting three matches for them in the 2015 Currie Cup qualification series. The Leopards finished second in the qualification series to progress to the Currie Cup First Division, a competition they eventually won. However, due to Deysel's involvement with Namibia at the 2015 Rugby World Cup, he played no part in the rest of their season.

At the end of 2015, he was included in the Sharks training squad that prepared for the 2016 Super Rugby season. He was named in their final 42-man squad, but released to play for NWU Pukke in the 2016 Varsity Cup and the Leopards in the 2016 Currie Cup qualification series.

=== Colomiers ===
On 11 September 2018, Deysel would head to France to sign for Colomiers in the Pro D2 competition from the 2018–19 season. On 24 December 2020, Deysel signed a two-year contract extension to stay at Colomiers until the end of the 2022–23 season.

== International career ==
=== Namibia ===
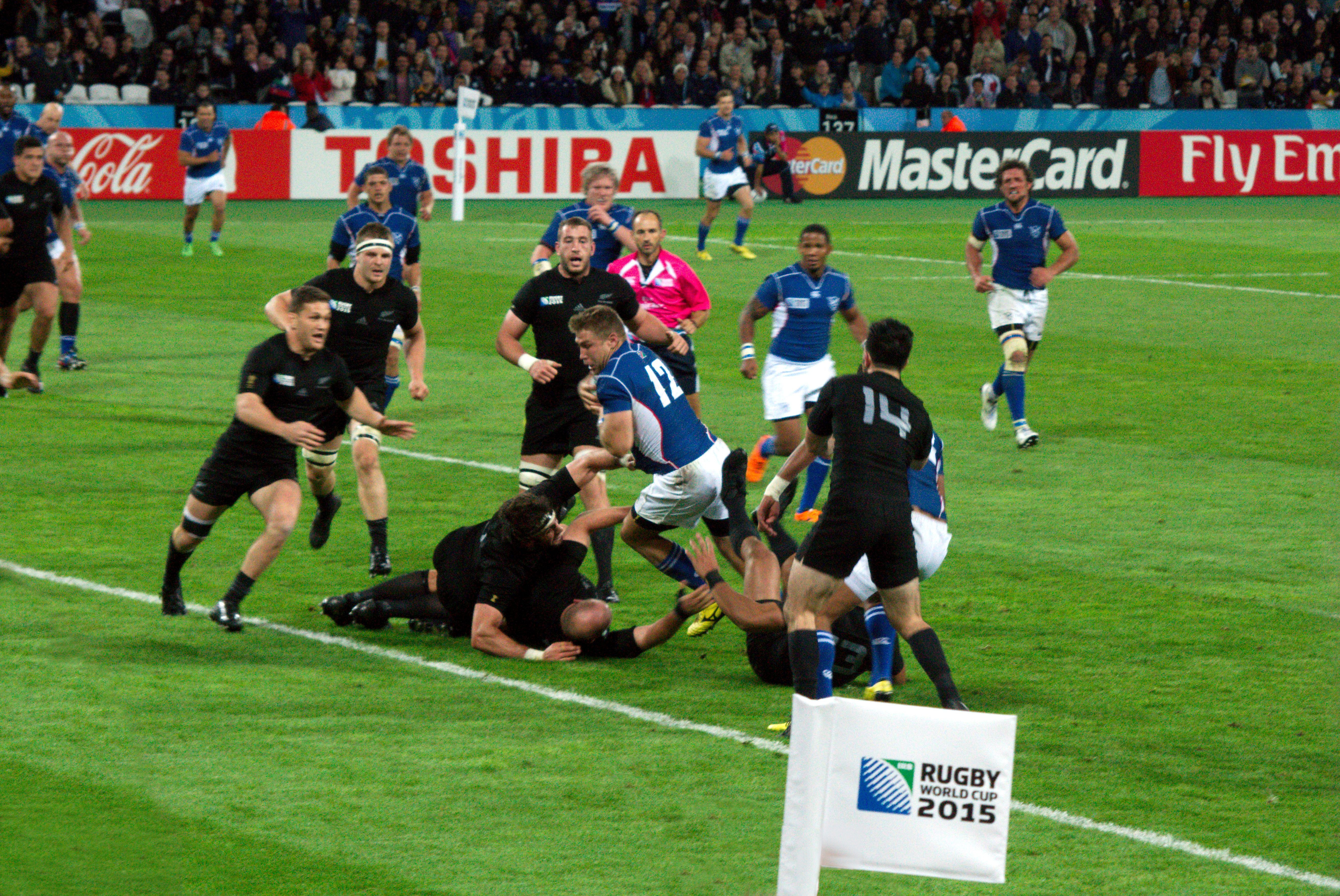
Deysel scoring a try against New Zealand in the 2015 Rugby World Cup

Deysel made his debut for Namibia by starting their 55–35 victory over Kenya in November 2013. He made a further eight appearances before being named in Namibia's squad for the 2015 Rugby World Cup. He started their first match of the competition against defending champions New Zealand on 24 September 2015 and scored Namibia's only try of the match in a 14–58 loss. He also started in a 21–35 defeat to Tonga and a 19–64 defeat to Argentina in the tournament, as Namibia lost all four matches to finish bottom of Pool C.

Deysel was suspended for five matches following his dangerous tackle on Antoine Dupont during the 2023 Rugby World Cup match against France.
