= 2014 Varsity Cup =

South African annual inter-university rugby union competition

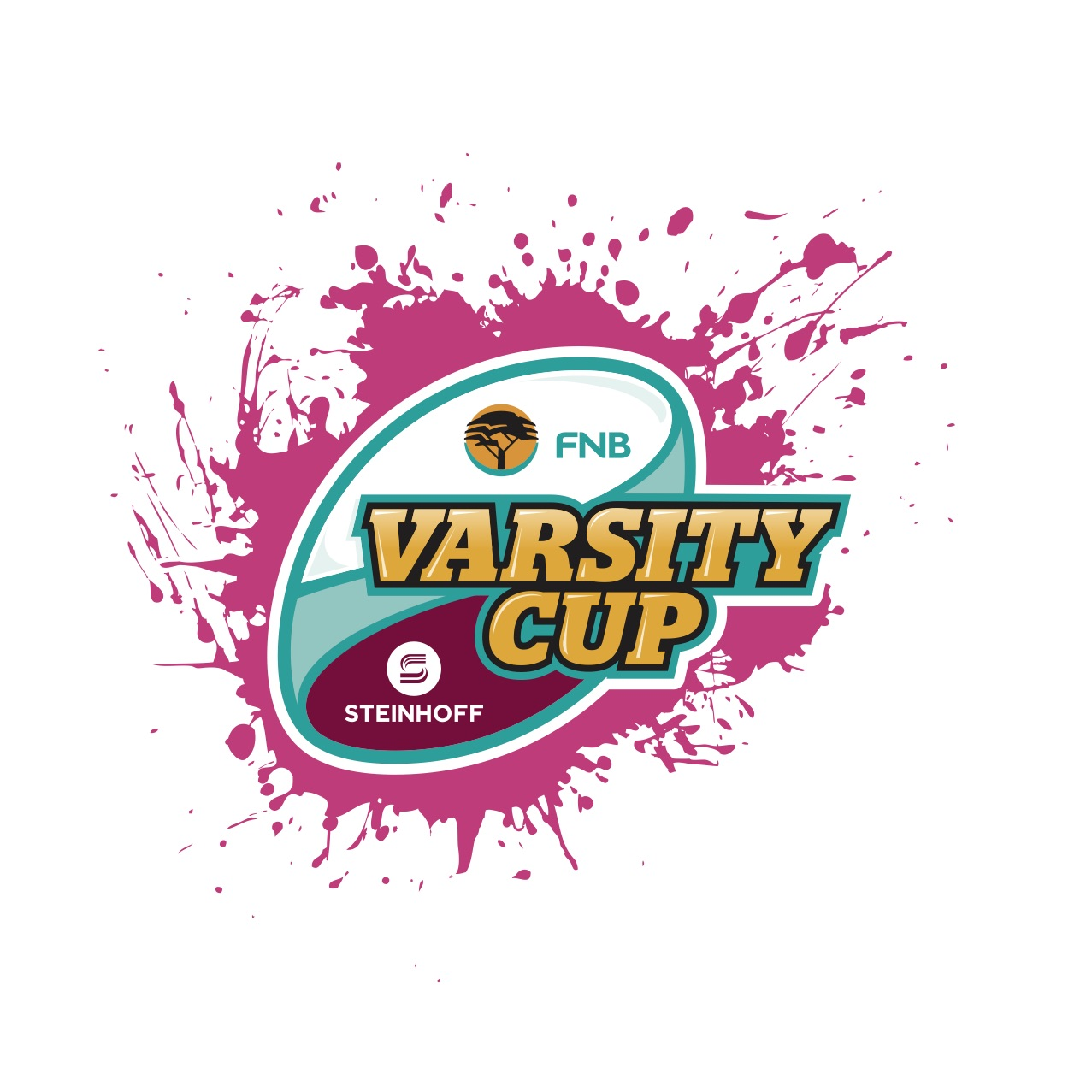
- Countries: South Africa
- Date: 3 February – 7 April 2014
- Champions: UCT Ikey Tigers (2nd title)
- Runners-up: NWU Pukke
- Relegated: Wits
- Matches played: 31
- Tries scored: 193 (average 6.2 per match)
- Top point scorer: Robert du Preez (84)
- Top try scorer: Chris Cloete (8)

The 2014 Varsity Cup was contested from 3 February to 7 April 2014. The tournament (also known as the FNB Varsity Cup presented by Steinhoff International for sponsorship reasons) was the seventh season of the Varsity Cup, an annual inter-university rugby union competition featuring eight South African universities.

The tournament was won by UCT Ikey Tigers for the second time; they beat NWU Pukke 39–33 in the final played on 7 April 2014. Wits were automatically relegated to the second-tier Varsity Shield competition for 2015, but UJ won their relegation play-off match against UKZN Impi to remain in the Varsity Cup for 2015.

== Rules ==
The Varsity Cup used a different scoring system to the regular system. Tries were worth five points as usual, but conversions were worth three points, while penalties and drop goals were only worth two points.

All Varsity Cup games also had two referees officiating each game, props' jerseys featured a special gripping patch to ensure better binding, intended to reduce collapsing scrums and the mark will be extended to the entire field.

== Competition ==
There were eight participating universities in the 2014 Varsity Cup. These teams played each other once over the course of the season, either home or away.

Teams received four points for a win and two points for a draw. Bonus points were awarded to teams that scored four or more tries in a game, as well as to teams that lost a match by seven points or less. Teams were ranked by log points, then points difference (points scored less points conceded).

The top four teams qualified for the title play-offs. In the semi-finals, the team that finished first had home advantage against the team that finished fourth, while the team that finished second had home advantage against the team that finished third. The winners of these semi-finals played each other in the final, at the home venue of the higher-placed team.

The bottom team in the Varsity Cup was relegated to the 2015 Varsity Shield competition, while the Varsity Shield winner was promoted to the 2015 Varsity Cup. There was also a promotion/relegation match between the 7th-placed team in the Varsity Cup and the Varsity Shield runner-up at the end of the 2014 season.

== Teams ==
Location of teams in the 2014 Varsity Cup

The following teams took part in the 2014 Varsity Cup competition:

2014 Varsity Cup teams
| Team name | University | Stadium |
| Maties | Stellenbosch University | Danie Craven Stadium, Stellenbosch |
| NMMU Madibaz | Nelson Mandela Metropolitan University | NMMU Stadium, Port Elizabeth |
| NWU Pukke | North-West University | Fanie du Toit Sport Ground, Potchefstroom |
| UCT Ikey Tigers | University of Cape Town | UCT Rugby Fields, Cape Town |
| UFS Shimlas | University of the Free State | Shimla Park, Bloemfontein |
| UJ | University of Johannesburg | UJ Stadium, Johannesburg |
| UP Tuks | University of Pretoria | LC de Villiers Stadium, Pretoria |
| Wits | University of the Witwatersrand | Wits Rugby Stadium, Johannesburg |

== Standings ==
The final league standings for the 2014 Varsity Cup were:

2014 Varsity Cup log
| Pos | Team | Pl | W | D | L | PF | PA | PD | TF | TA | TB | LB | Pts |
| 1 | NWU Pukke | 7 | 6 | 0 | 1 | 226 | 130 | +96 | 30 | 16 | 3 | 0 | 27 |
| 2 | UCT Ikey Tigers | 7 | 5 | 0 | 2 | 186 | 141 | +45 | 26 | 21 | 4 | 0 | 24 |
| 3 | Maties | 7 | 4 | 1 | 2 | 174 | 159 | +15 | 23 | 22 | 3 | 0 | 21 |
| 4 | NMMU Madibaz | 7 | 4 | 0 | 3 | 165 | 177 | –12 | 22 | 23 | 2 | 1 | 19 |
| 5 | UFS Shimlas | 7 | 3 | 1 | 3 | 164 | 173 | –9 | 23 | 24 | 4 | 0 | 18 |
| 6 | UP Tuks | 7 | 3 | 1 | 3 | 156 | 120 | +36 | 21 | 14 | 2 | 0 | 16 |
| 7 | UJ | 7 | 1 | 1 | 5 | 135 | 191 | –56 | 17 | 26 | 2 | 2 | 10 |
| 8 | Wits | 7 | 0 | 0 | 7 | 78 | 193 | –115 | 12 | 28 | 0 | 2 | 2 |
* Legend: Pos = Position, Pl = Played, W = Won, D = Drawn, L = Lost, PF = Points for, PA = Points against, PD = Points difference, TF = Tries for, TA = Tries against, TB = Try bonus points, LB = Losing bonus points, Pts = Log points NWU Pukke, UCT Ikey Tigers, Maties and NMMU Madibaz qualified to the semi-finals. UJ qualified to the relegation play-offs. Wits were relegated to the 2015 Varsity Shield. Points breakdown: *4 points for a win *2 points for a draw *1 bonus point for a loss by seven points or less *1 bonus point for scoring four or more tries in a match

=== Round-by-round ===
Team Progression – 2014 Varsity Cup
| Team | R1 | R2 | R3 | R4 | R5 | R6 | R7 | Semi | Final |
|---|---|---|---|---|---|---|---|---|---|
| UCT Ikey Tigers | 0 (8th) | 5 (5th) | 9 (4th) | 9 (5th) | 14 (3rd) | 19 (2nd) | 24 (2nd) | Won | Won |
| NWU Pukke | 5 (1st) | 10 (1st) | 10 (2nd) | 15 (2nd) | 19 (1st) | 23 (1st) | 27 (1st) | Won | Lost |
| Maties | 1 (6th) | 1 (7th) | 6 (6th) | 10 (4th) | 12 (6th) | 16 (5th) | 21 (3rd) | Lost | —N/a |
| NMMU Madibaz | 5 (2nd) | 9 (2nd) | 9 (3rd) | 9 (6th) | 13 (5th) | 17 (3rd) | 19 (4th) | Lost | —N/a |
| UFS Shimlas | 5 (3rd) | 6 (4th) | 6 (7th) | 11 (3rd) | 13 (4th) | 13 (6th) | 18 (5th) | —N/a | —N/a |
| UP Tuks | 2 (4th) | 7 (3rd) | 11 (1st) | 16 (1st) | 16 (2nd) | 16 (4th) | 16 (6th) | —N/a | —N/a |
| UJ | 2 (4th) | 3 (6th) | 8 (5th) | 8 (7th) | 9 (5th) | 9 (7th) | 10 (7th) | —N/a | —N/a |
| Wits | 0 (7th) | 0 (8th) | 0 (8th) | 1 (8th) | 2 (8th) | 2 (8th) | 2 (8th) | —N/a | —N/a |
The table above shows a team's progression throughout the season. For each round, their cumulative points total is shown with the overall log position in brackets.
| Key: | win | draw | loss | | | | | | |

== Pool stages ==
The 2014 Varsity Cup fixtures were as follows:

- All times are South African (GMT+2).

=== Round one ===
| 3 February 2014 | NMMU Madibaz | 45–29 | Maties | NMMU Stadium, Port Elizabeth |
| 16:45 | Try: Chris Cloete 4', 11', 49', 58', 63'; Tim Agaba 32'; Con: Gavin Hauptfleisch 12', 33', 50', 59', 64' (5/6); Cards: Ivan Ludick (yellow card) 78' | Scoreboard; Report | Try: Mark Hodgkiss 55', 79'; Clearance Khumalo 67'; Reinier Ehlers 75'; Con: Robert du Preez 67', 75' (2/3); Chris Smith 56' (1/1); Cards: Lungelo Chonco (yellow card) 63' to 73' | Referee: Christie du Preez & Rodney Boneparte |

| 3 February 2014 | UP Tuks | 18–18 | UJ | LC de Villiers Stadium, Pretoria |
| 19:00 | Try: Rudolph Smith 19'; Warrick Gelant 25'; Rohan Janse van Rensburg 39'; Con: Warrick Gelant 40' (1/3) | Scoreboard; Report | Try: David Antonites 6'; Robert de Bruyn 37'; Con: Marais Schmidt 7', 37' (2/2); Pen: Marais Schmidt 40' (1/1); Jaco van der Walt (0/1); Cards: Marais Schmidt (yellow card) 11' to 22' | Referee: Jaco van Heerden & Ben Crouse |

| 3 February 2014 | UFS Shimlas | 31–15 | Wits | Shimla Park, Bloemfontein |
| 19:00 | Try: Niell Jordaan 4'; Divandré Strydom 12'; Fanie van der Walt 51'; Neil Claassen 55'; Con: Gouws Prinsloo 5', 13', 52' (3/4); Pen: Gouws Prinsloo 40' (1/1) | Scoreboard; Report | Try: JJ Breet 33'; Ashlon Davids 63'; Hannes Ludick 77'; Con: Matt Torrance (0/3) | Attendance: 3,000; Referee: Lourens van der Merwe & Jaco Kotze |

| 3 February 2014 | UCT Ikey Tigers | 24–47 | NWU Pukke | UCT Rugby Fields, Cape Town |
| 17:00 | Try: Ross Jones-Davies 2', 44'; Shaun McDonald 13'; Con: Dean Grant 3', 14', 45' (3/3); Cards: Jason Klaasen (yellow card) 60' | Scoreboard; Report | Try: Juan Language 24'; Sylvian Mahuza 26', 37'; Luther Obi 49'; Stompie de Wet 57'; Francois Robertse 70'; Danie Jordaan 75'; Con: Tiaan Dorfling 27', 38', 58', 70' (4/6); Adriaan Engelbrecht (0/1) | Referee: Daniel Fortuin & Quinton Immelman |

=== Round two ===
| 10 February 2014 | Maties | 16–33 | UCT Ikey Tigers | Danie Craven Stadium, Stellenbosch |
| 16:45 | Try: Johnny Kôtze 8'; Robert du Preez 73'; Con: Robert du Preez 9', 74' (2/2); Cards: Beyers de Villiers (yellow card) 20' to 30' | Scoreboard Report | Try: Jason Klaasen 22', 43'; Lihleli Xoli 28'; Liam Slatem 75'; Con: Dean Grant 23', 44', 76' (3/4); Pen: Dean Grant 40', 60' (2/2) | Referee: Daniel Fortuin & Francois Pretorius |

| 10 February 2014 | NWU Pukke | 48–29 | UFS Shimlas | Fanie du Toit Sport Ground, Potchefstroom |
| 19:00 | Try: Tiaan Dorfling 31'; Adriaan Engelbrecht 46'; Sylvian Mahuza 48', 81'; Johnny Welthagen 56'; Edmar Marais 58'; Con: Adriaan Engelbrecht 32', 47', 49', 57', 59', 82' (6/6); Cards: Edmar Marais (yellow card) 73' | Scoreboard; Report | Try: Niell Jordaan 23', 40'; Neil Claassen 52'; Maphutha Dolo 79'; Con: Gouws Prinsloo 40', 52', 79' (3/4) | Referee: Oregopotse Rametsi & Stephan Geldenhuys |

| 10 February 2014 | UJ | 15–21 | NMMU Madibaz | UJ Stadium, Johannesburg |
| 19:00 | Try: Michael Haznar 14'; David Antonites 48'; Con: Marais Schmidt 49' (1/2); Pen: Marais Schmidt 74' (1/1); Drop: Jaco van der Walt (0/1); Cards: Michael Haznar (yellow card) 49' to 61' | Scoreboard; Report | Try: Yamkela Ngam 31'; Donovan Marais 44'; Chris Cloete 80'; Con: Gavin Hauptfleisch 32', 81' (2/3); Cards: Martin Ferreira (yellow card) 49' to 61' | Attendance: 10,000; Referee: Jaco van Heerden & Ben Crouse |

| 10 February 2014 | Wits | 8–53 | UP Tuks | Wits Rugby Stadium, Johannesburg |
| 19:00 | Try: Matt Torrance 9'; Con: Matt Torrance 9' (1/1) | Scoreboard; Report | Try: Dries Swanepoel 11', 16', 29'; Wiaan Liebenberg 46'; Reniel Hugo 64'; Jade Stighling 69'; Brummer Badenhorst 76'; Con: Tian Schoeman 11', 30', 47', 64', 69', 76' (6/7); Cards: Dries Swanepoel (yellow card) 58' | Attendance: 3,000; Referee: Tahla Ntshakaza & Jaco Kotze |

=== Round three ===
| 17 February 2014 | UJ | 32–15 | Wits | UJ Stadium, Johannesburg |
| 16:45 | Try: Michael Haznar 12'; Jacques Nel 27'; Tiaan Macdonald 37', 71'; Con: Marais Schmidt 13', 28', 38' (3/3); Jaco van der Walt 72' (1/1) | Scoreboard; Report | Try: Jason Fraser 59'; JP Jonck 64'; Con: Matt Torrance 60' (1/2); Pen: Matt Torrance 3' (1/1) | Referee: Eduan Nel |

| 17 February 2014 | UP Tuks | 26–0 | UFS Shimlas | LC de Villiers Stadium, Pretoria |
| 19:00 | Try: Roelof Smit 21'; Wiaan Liebenberg 69'; Reniel Hugo 81'; Con: Tian Schoeman 22', 70', 82' (3/3); Pen: Tian Schoeman 76' (1/2) | Scoreboard; Report | | Referee: Gerrie de Bruin |

| 17 February 2014 | NWU Pukke | 21–33 | Maties | Fanie du Toit Sport Ground, Potchefstroom |
| 19:00 | Try: Luther Obi 45'; HP Swart 52'; Dillon Smit 70'; Con: Adriaan Engelbrecht 52', 70' (2/3) | Scoreboard; Report | Try: Beyers de Villiers 3'; Johnny Kôtze 13'; Robert du Preez 30'; Louis Jordaan 54'; Con: Robert du Preez 4', 31', 54' (3/4); Pen: Robert du Preez 72', 80' (2/2); Cards: Niel Oelofse (yellow card) 37' to 48' | Referee: Pro Legoete |

| 17 February 2014 | NMMU Madibaz | 13–26 | UCT Ikey Tigers | NMMU Stadium, Port Elizabeth |
| 19:00 | Try: Michael Bernardt 25'; Enrico Acker 58'; Con: Gavin Hauptfleisch 26' (1/2); Cards: Martin Ferreira (yellow card) 46' | Scoreboard; Report | Try: Shaun McDonald 4'; Lihleli Xoli 39'; Richard Stewart 79'; Con: Dean Grant 5', 39', 80' (3/3); Pen: Dean Grant 45' (1/1); Cards: Shaun McDonald (yellow card) 30' to 40'; Robin Murray (yellow card) 56' to 66' | Attendance: 7,650; Referee: Rodney Boneparte |

=== Round four ===
| 24 February 2014 | UCT Ikey Tigers | 16–26 | UP Tuks | UCT Rugby Fields, Cape Town |
| 16:45 | Try: Liam Slatem 6'; Huw Jones 81'; Con: Dean Grant 7', 81' (2/2) | Scoreboard; Report | Try: Juan Schoeman 40'; Warrick Gelant 45'; Duncan Matthews 65'; Arno van Wyk 79'; Con: Tian Schoeman 40', 80' (2/4); Cards: Leneve Damens (yellow card) 75' | Referee: Marius van der Westhuizen & Cwengile Jadezweni |

| 24 February 2014 | NMMU Madibaz | 16–52 | NWU Pukke | NMMU Stadium, Port Elizabeth |
| 19:00 | Try: Michael Bernardt 64', 66'; Con: Jarryd Buys 65', 67' (2/2) | Scoreboard; Report | Try: Akker van der Merwe 4'; Sylvian Mahuza 21', 73'; Edmar Marais 27'; Francois Robertse 42'; Juan Language 47'; Luther Obi 76'; Con: Adriaan Engelbrecht 5', 28', 43', 48', 77' (5/7); Drop: Johnny Welthagen 24' (1/1); Cards: Lucky Ngcamu (yellow card) 51' to 61'; Hoffmann Maritz (yellow card) 64' to 74' | Referee: Ben Crouse & Jaco van Heerden |

| 24 February 2014 | Maties | 18–15 | Wits | Danie Craven Stadium, Stellenbosch |
| 19:00 | Try: Frederick Kirsten 37'; Jan de Klerk 53'; Robert du Preez 56'; Con: Robert du Preez 56' (1/3) | Scoreboard; Report | Try: Jason Fraser 12'; Ashlon Davids 24'; Ruhan Nel 83'; Con: Ashlon Davids (0/1); Matt Torrance (0/2); Cards: JJ Breet (yellow card) 34' to 44'; Kyle Wood (yellow card) 51' to 61'; Brent Crossley (yellow card) 81' | Referee: Francois Pretorius & Quinton Immelman |

| 24 February 2014 | UFS Shimlas | 52–13 | UJ | Shimla Park, Bloemfontein |
| 19:00 | Try: Oupa Mohojé 5'; Maphutha Dolo 12'; Sethu Tom 22'; Joubert Engelbrecht 36', 48'; Tertius Kruger 39'; Divandré Strydom 78'; Con: Gouws Prinsloo 6', 13', 37', 49', 79' (5/7); Pen: Gouws Prinsloo 42' (1/1); Cards: Markus Odendaal (yellow card) 61' to 72' | Scoreboard; Report | Try: Harold Vorster 62'; Jacques Pretorius 65'; Con: Marais Schmidt 62' (1/2); Cards: Michael Haznar (yellow card) 56' to 65' | Attendance: 7,000; Referee: Eduan Nel & Gerrie de Bruin |

=== Round five ===
| 3 March 2014 | Wits | 12–18 | NMMU Madibaz | Wits Rugby Stadium, Johannesburg |
| 16:45 | Try: Brent Crossley 70'; Con: Matt Torrance 71' (1/1); Pen: Matt Torrance 19', 24' (2/3); Cards: Rinus Bothma (yellow card) 31' to 41' | Scoreboard; Report | Try: Chris Cloete 28'; Jarryd Buys 55'; Enrico Acker 81'; Con: Jarryd Buys 56' (1/3); Cards: Michael Bernardt (yellow card) 18' to 28' | Referee: Marius van der Westhuizen & Pro Legoete |

| 3 March 2014 | UJ | 29–37 | UCT Ikey Tigers | UJ Stadium, Johannesburg |
| 19:00 | Try: PJ Walters 21', 79'; David Antonites 33'; Jaco van der Walt 57'; Con: Marais Schmidt 22', 34', 58' (3/4); Cards: Jacques Pretorius (yellow card) 44' to 54'; Shane Kirkwood (yellow card) 44' to 54' | Scoreboard; Report | Try: Richard Stewart 2'; Vince Jobo 8'; Ross Jones-Davies 13'; Guy Alexander 40'; Lihleli Xoli 46'; Con: Dean Grant 3', 9', 40', 47' (4/5); Cards: Huw Jones (yellow card) 18' to 28'; Martin Sauls (yellow card) 49' to 59' | Referee: Rasta Rasivhenge & Jaco van Heerden |

| 3 March 2014 | UP Tuks | 0–18 | NWU Pukke | LC de Villiers Stadium, Pretoria |
| 19:00 | | Scoreboard; Report | Try: Akker van der Merwe 37'; Danie Jordaan 52'; Con: Adriaan Engelbrecht 38', 53' (2/2); Pen: Adriaan Engelbrecht 31' (1/1) | Attendance: 1,500; Referee: Jaco Pretorius & Gerrie de Bruin |

| 3 March 2014 | Maties | 13–13 | UFS Shimlas | Danie Craven Stadium, Stellenbosch |
| 19:00 | Try: Robert du Preez 42'; Jean Nel 70'; Con: Robert du Preez 43' (1/2) | Scoreboard; Report | Try: Justin Pappin 20'; Sethu Tom 32'; Con: Gouws Prinsloo 21' (1/2); Cards: Tienie Burger (yellow card) 69' | Referee: Cwengile Jadezweni & Christie du Preez |

=== Round six ===
| 10 March 2014 | NWU Pukke | 16–8 | Wits | Fanie du Toit Sport Ground, Potchefstroom |
| 16:45 | Try: Jacques Vermaak 25'; Stompie de Wet 62'; Con: Adriaan Engelbrecht 26', 63' (2/2); Pen: Adriaan Engelbrecht (0/1); Drop: Johnny Welthagen (0/1) | Scoreboard | Try: Ruhan Nel 64'; Con: Ashlon Davids 65' (1/1); Cards: Brent Crossley (yellow card) 27' to 37' | Referee: Jaco Kotze & Jaco Pretorius |

| 10 March 2014 | UJ | 8–24 | Maties | UJ Stadium, Johannesburg |
| 19:00 | Try: Van Zyl Botha 61'; Con: Marais Schmidt 62' (1/1) | Scoreboard | Try: Jan de Klerk 4'; Beyers de Villiers 24', 34'; Con: Robert du Preez 5', 25', 35' (3/3) | Referee: Rasta Rasivhenge & Tahla Ntshakaza |

| 10 March 2014 | UP Tuks | 9–19 | NMMU Madibaz | LC de Villiers Stadium, Pretoria |
| 19:00 | Try: Chris Massyn 51'; Con: Tian Schoeman (0/1); Pen: Tian Schoeman 14', 24' (2/2) | Scoreboard | Try: Tythan Adams 28'; Roy Godfrey 47'; Con: Gavin Hauptfleisch 48' (1/2); Pen: Gavin Hauptfleisch 6', 16', 54' (3/3) | Attendance: 200; Referee: Stephan Geldenhuys & Oregopotse Rametsi |

| 10 March 2014 | UCT Ikey Tigers | 25–5 | UFS Shimlas | UCT Rugby Fields, Cape Town |
| 17:00 | Try: Shaun McDonald 18'; Ross Jones-Davies 49', 3'; Jason Klaasen 6'; Con: Dean Grant 19' (1/4); Pen: Dean Grant 63' (1/1) | Scoreboard | Try: Gideon Bruwer 71'; Con: Gouws Prinsloo (0/1) | Attendance: 950; Referee: Marius van der Westhuizen & Quinton Immelman |

=== Round seven ===
| 17 March 2014 | UFS Shimlas | 34–33 | NMMU Madibaz | Shimla Park, Bloemfontein |
| 16:45 | Try: Neil Claassen 13'; Jacques du Toit 22', 39'; Maphutha Dolo 52'; Gouws Prinsloo 67'; Con: Gouws Prinsloo 23', 40', 53' (3/5); Cards: Oupa Mohojé (yellow card) 41' to 52'; Armandt Koster (yellow card) 80' | Scoreboard | Try: Michael Bernardt 4'; Gavin Hauptfleisch 24'; Martin Ferreira 61'; Louis Fourie 80'; Con: Gavin Hauptfleisch 5', 25' (2/3); Jarryd Buys 80' (1/1); Pen: Gavin Hauptfleisch 8', 35' (2/2); Drop: Gavin Hauptfleisch (0/1); Cards: Marcel Groenewald (yellow card) 39' to 51'; Martin Ferreira (yellow card) 47' to 58' | Referee: Cwengile Jadezweni & Marius van der Westhuizen |

| 17 March 2014 | Maties | 41–24 | UP Tuks | Danie Craven Stadium, Stellenbosch |
| 19:00 | Try: Robert du Preez 46'; Craig Barry 53', 75'; Caleb Smith 58'; Chris Smith 80'; Con: Robert du Preez 46', 54', 59', 76' (4/5); Pen: Robert du Preez 64', 79' (2/2); Cards: Mark Hodgkiss (yellow card) 39' to 49' | Scoreboard | Try: Basil Short 4'; Duncan Matthews 16'; Andrew Beerwinkel 67'; Con: Tian Schoeman 5', 17', 68' (3/3) | Attendance: 8,500; Referee: Jaco Kotze & Rodney Boneparte |

| 17 March 2014 | NWU Pukke | 24–20 | UJ | Fanie du Toit Sport Ground, Potchefstroom |
| 19:00 | Try: Stompie de Wet 58'; Hoffmann Maritz 64'; Joe Smith 69'; Con: Adriaan Engelbrecht 58', 65', 70' (3/3); Drop: Johnny Welthagen (0/1) | Scoreboard | Try: Dylan Peterson 27'; Michael Haznar 78'; Con: Marais Schmidt 28', 78' (2/2); Drop: Jaun Kotzé 10', 49' (2/2) | Referee: Gerrie de Bruin & Eduan Nel |

| 17 March 2014 | Wits | 5–25 | UCT Ikey Tigers | Wits Rugby Stadium, Johannesburg |
| 19:00 | Try: Hannes Ludick 52'; Con: Matt Torrance (0/1) | Scoreboard | Try: Richard Stewart 5'; Lihleli Xoli 13'; Liam Slatem 60'; Shaun McDonald 67'; Nate Nel 76'; Con: Dean Grant (0/2); Ross Jones-Davies (0/3) | Attendance: 5,500; Referee: Oregopotse Rametsi & Archie Sehlako |

== Play-offs ==
Semi-finals
24 March 2014
UCT Ikey Tigers | 20
Maties | 08
24 March 2014
NWU Pukke | 19
NMMU Madibaz | 18

Final
7 April 2014
UCT Ikey Tigers | 39
NWU Pukke | 33

=== Semi-finals ===
24 March 2014
16:30

| UCT Ikey Tigers | 20–8 | Maties |
| Try: Lihleli Xoli 41'; Mike Botha 67'; Con: Dean Grant 41', 68' (2/2); Pen: Dean Grant 49', 60' (2/2); Cards: Richard Stewart (yellow card) 24' to 34'; Liam Slatem (yellow card) 71' | Scoreboard | Try: Louis Nel 72'; Con: Robert du Preez 73' (1/1) |

UCT Rugby Fields, Cape Town
Referee: Stephan Geldenhuys & Rodney Boneparte

24 March 2014
19:00

| NWU Pukke | 19–18 | NMMU Madibaz |
| Try: Rhyk Welgemoed 4'; Luther Obi 7'; Con: Adriaan Engelbrecht 5' (1/2); Pen: Adriaan Engelbrecht 45', 49' (2/2); Rhyno Smith 79' (1/1); Drop: Johnny Welthagen (0/1); Cards: Akker van der Merwe (yellow card) 28' to 38' | Scoreboard | Try: Chris Cloete 30'; Tythan Adams 59'; Con: Gavin Hauptfleisch 31', 60' (2/2); Drop: Jarryd Buys 68' (1/2) |

Fanie du Toit Sport Ground, Potchefstroom
Referee: Jaco Kotze & Tahla Ntshakaza

=== Final ===
7 April 2014
19:00

| NWU Pukke | 33–39 | UCT Ikey Tigers |
| Try: Rhyk Welgemoed 14'; Luther Obi 17'; Akker van der Merwe 43'; Dillon Smit 66'; Francois Robertse 72'; Con: Tiaan Dorfling 15' (1/2); Dillon Smit 67' (1/3); Pen: Dillon Smit 55' (1/1); Drop: Johnny Welthagen (0/1); Cards: Johan Deysel (yellow card) 37' to 47'; Lucky Ngcamu (yellow card) 51' to 61' | Scoreboard | Try: Huw Jones 4'; Richard Stewart 25'; Jason Klaasen 59'; Mike Botha 75'; Dean Grant 79'; Nate Nel 83'; Con: Dean Grant 75', 79' (2/5); James Alexander 84' (1/1); Cards: Lihleli Xoli (yellow card) 63' |

Fanie du Toit Sport Ground, Potchefstroom

| NWU Pukke | UCT |

| FB | 15 | Sylvian Mahuza |
| RW | 14 | Edmar Marais |
| OC | 13 | Jaap Pienaar |
| IC | 12 | Johan Deysel |
| LW | 11 | Luther Obi |
| FH | 10 | Johnny Welthagen |
| SH | 9 | Tiaan Dorfling (c) |
| N8 | 8 | Juan Language |
| OF | 7 | Henro-Pierre Swart| |
| BF | 6 | Rhyk Welgemoed |
| RL | 5 | Francois Robbertse |
| LL | 4 | Peet van der Walt |
| TP | 3 | Nhlanhla Ngcamu |
| HK | 2 | Armand van der Merwe |
| LP | 1 | Mashudu Mafela |
Replacements:
| | 16 | Marius Fourie |
| | 17 | Johan Smith |
| | 18 | Daniel Jordaan |
| | 19 | Philip de Wet |
| | 20 | Dillon Smit |
| | 21 | Rhyno Smith |
| | 22 | Lucien Cupido |
| | 23 | John-Roy Jenkinson |
Coach:
Robert du Preez

| FB | 15 | Ross Jones-Davies |
| RW | 14 | Richard Stewart |
| OC | 13 | Huw Jones |
| IC | 12 | Guy Schwikkard |
| LW | 11 | Lihleli Xoli |
| FH | 10 | Dean Grant |
| SH | 9 | Laim Slatem (c) |
| N8 | 8 | Michael Botha |
| OF | 7 | Vince Jobo |
| BF | 6 | Jason Klaasen |
| RL | 5 | James Kilroe |
| LL | 4 | Shaun McDonald |
| TP | 3 | Digby Webb |
| HK | 2 | Neil Rautenbach |
| LP | 1 | Joel Carew |
Replacements:
| | 16 | Chad Solomon |
| | 17 | Robin Murray |
| | 18 | Kyle Kriel |
| | 19 | Guy Alexander |
| | 20 | James Alexander |
| | 21 | Martin Sauls |
| | 22 | Nathan Nel |
| | 23 | David Maasch |
Coach:
Tom Dawson-Squibb

Player of the Match:
Armand van der Merwe NWU Pukke

Assistant referees:
Francois Pretorius (South Africa), Jaco Kotze (South Africa)

Television match official:
Johan Greef (South Africa)

== Players ==
=== Player statistics ===
The following table contain points which have been scored in competitive games in the 2014 Varsity Cup:

All point scorers
| No | Player | Team | T | C | P | DG | Pts |
|---|---|---|---|---|---|---|---|
| 1 | Robert du Preez | Maties | 5 | 17 | 4 | 0 | 84 |
| 2 | Dean Grant | UCT Ikey Tigers | 1 | 20 | 6 | 0 | 77 |
| 3 | Adriaan Engelbrecht | NWU Pukke | 1 | 21 | 3 | 0 | 74 |
| 4 | Gavin Hauptfleisch | NMMU Madibaz | 1 | 13 | 5 | 0 | 54 |
| 4 | Gouws Prinsloo | UFS Shimlas | 1 | 15 | 2 | 0 | 54 |
| 6 | Tian Schoeman | UP Tuks | 0 | 14 | 3 | 0 | 48 |
| 7 | Marais Schmidt | UJ | 0 | 13 | 2 | 0 | 43 |
| 8 | Chris Cloete | NMMU Madibaz | 8 | 0 | 0 | 0 | 40 |
| 9 | Sylvian Mahuza | NWU Pukke | 6 | 0 | 0 | 0 | 30 |
| 10 | Ross Jones-Davies | UCT Ikey Tigers | 5 | 0 | 0 | 0 | 25 |
| 10 | Luther Obi | NWU Pukke | 5 | 0 | 0 | 0 | 25 |
| 10 | Lihleli Xoli | UCT Ikey Tigers | 5 | 0 | 0 | 0 | 25 |
| 13 | Michael Bernardt | NMMU Madibaz | 4 | 0 | 0 | 0 | 20 |
| 13 | Tiaan Dorfling | NWU Pukke | 1 | 5 | 0 | 0 | 20 |
| 13 | Jason Klaasen | UCT Ikey Tigers | 4 | 0 | 0 | 0 | 20 |
| 13 | Shaun McDonald | UCT Ikey Tigers | 4 | 0 | 0 | 0 | 20 |
| 13 | Richard Stewart | UCT Ikey Tigers | 4 | 0 | 0 | 0 | 20 |
| 13 | Matt Torrance | Wits | 1 | 3 | 3 | 0 | 20 |
| 19 | David Antonites | UJ | 3 | 0 | 0 | 0 | 15 |
| 19 | Neil Claassen | UFS Shimlas | 3 | 0 | 0 | 0 | 15 |
| 19 | Beyers de Villiers | Maties | 3 | 0 | 0 | 0 | 15 |
| 19 | Stompie de Wet | NWU Pukke | 3 | 0 | 0 | 0 | 15 |
| 19 | Maphutha Dolo | UFS Shimlas | 3 | 0 | 0 | 0 | 15 |
| 19 | Michael Haznar | UJ | 3 | 0 | 0 | 0 | 15 |
| 19 | Niell Jordaan | UFS Shimlas | 3 | 0 | 0 | 0 | 15 |
| 19 | Francois Robertse | NWU Pukke | 3 | 0 | 0 | 0 | 15 |
| 19 | Liam Slatem | UCT Ikey Tigers | 3 | 0 | 0 | 0 | 15 |
| 19 | Dillon Smit | NWU Pukke | 2 | 1 | 1 | 0 | 15 |
| 19 | Dries Swanepoel | UP Tuks | 3 | 0 | 0 | 0 | 15 |
| 19 | Akker van der Merwe | NWU Pukke | 3 | 0 | 0 | 0 | 15 |
| 31 | Jarryd Buys | NMMU Madibaz | 0 | 4 | 0 | 1 | 14 |
| 32 | Ashlon Davids | Wits | 2 | 1 | 0 | 0 | 13 |
| 32 | Warrick Gelant | UP Tuks | 2 | 1 | 0 | 0 | 13 |
| 34 | Enrico Acker | NMMU Madibaz | 2 | 0 | 0 | 0 | 10 |
| 34 | Tythan Adams | NMMU Madibaz | 2 | 0 | 0 | 0 | 10 |
| 34 | Craig Barry | Maties | 2 | 0 | 0 | 0 | 10 |
| 34 | Mike Botha | UCT Ikey Tigers | 2 | 0 | 0 | 0 | 10 |
| 34 | Jan de Klerk | Maties | 2 | 0 | 0 | 0 | 10 |
| 34 | Jacques du Toit | UFS Shimlas | 2 | 0 | 0 | 0 | 10 |
| 34 | Joubert Engelbrecht | UFS Shimlas | 2 | 0 | 0 | 0 | 10 |
| 34 | Jason Fraser | Wits | 2 | 0 | 0 | 0 | 10 |
| 34 | Mark Hodgkiss | Maties | 2 | 0 | 0 | 0 | 10 |
| 34 | Reniel Hugo | UP Tuks | 2 | 0 | 0 | 0 | 10 |
| 34 | Huw Jones | UCT Ikey Tigers | 2 | 0 | 0 | 0 | 10 |
| 34 | Danie Jordaan | NWU Pukke | 2 | 0 | 0 | 0 | 10 |
| 34 | Johnny Kôtze | Maties | 2 | 0 | 0 | 0 | 10 |
| 34 | Juan Language | NWU Pukke | 2 | 0 | 0 | 0 | 10 |
| 34 | Wiaan Liebenberg | UP Tuks | 2 | 0 | 0 | 0 | 10 |
| 34 | Hannes Ludick | Wits | 2 | 0 | 0 | 0 | 10 |
| 34 | Tiaan Macdonald | UJ | 2 | 0 | 0 | 0 | 10 |
| 34 | Edmar Marais | NWU Pukke | 2 | 0 | 0 | 0 | 10 |
| 34 | Duncan Matthews | UP Tuks | 2 | 0 | 0 | 0 | 10 |
| 34 | Jean Nel | Maties | 2 | 0 | 0 | 0 | 10 |
| 34 | Nate Nel | UCT Ikey Tigers | 2 | 0 | 0 | 0 | 10 |
| 34 | Ruhan Nel | Wits | 2 | 0 | 0 | 0 | 10 |
| 34 | Yamkela Ngam | NMMU Madibaz | 2 | 0 | 0 | 0 | 10 |
| 34 | Divandré Strydom | UFS Shimlas | 2 | 0 | 0 | 0 | 10 |
| 34 | Sethu Tom | UFS Shimlas | 2 | 0 | 0 | 0 | 10 |
| 34 | PJ Walters | UJ | 2 | 0 | 0 | 0 | 10 |
| 34 | Rhyk Welgemoed | NWU Pukke | 2 | 0 | 0 | 0 | 10 |
| 61 | Chris Smith | Maties | 1 | 1 | 0 | 0 | 8 |
| 61 | Jaco van der Walt | UJ | 1 | 1 | 0 | 0 | 8 |
| 63 | Johnny Welthagen | NWU Pukke | 1 | 0 | 0 | 1 | 7 |
| 64 | Tim Agaba | NMMU Madibaz | 1 | 0 | 0 | 0 | 5 |
| 64 | Guy Alexander | UCT Ikey Tigers | 1 | 0 | 0 | 0 | 5 |
| 64 | Brummer Badenhorst | UP Tuks | 1 | 0 | 0 | 0 | 5 |
| 64 | Andrew Beerwinkel | UP Tuks | 1 | 0 | 0 | 0 | 5 |
| 64 | Van Zyl Botha | UJ | 1 | 0 | 0 | 0 | 5 |
| 64 | JJ Breet | Wits | 1 | 0 | 0 | 0 | 5 |
| 64 | Gideon Bruwer | UFS Shimlas | 1 | 0 | 0 | 0 | 5 |
| 64 | Brent Crossley | Wits | 1 | 0 | 0 | 0 | 5 |
| 64 | Robert de Bruyn | UJ | 1 | 0 | 0 | 0 | 5 |
| 64 | Reinier Ehlers | Maties | 1 | 0 | 0 | 0 | 5 |
| 64 | Martin Ferreira | NMMU Madibaz | 1 | 0 | 0 | 0 | 5 |
| 64 | Louis Fourie | NMMU Madibaz | 1 | 0 | 0 | 0 | 5 |
| 64 | Roy Godfrey | NMMU Madibaz | 1 | 0 | 0 | 0 | 5 |
| 64 | Rohan Janse van Rensburg | UP Tuks | 1 | 0 | 0 | 0 | 5 |
| 64 | Vince Jobo | UCT Ikey Tigers | 1 | 0 | 0 | 0 | 5 |
| 64 | JP Jonck | Wits | 1 | 0 | 0 | 0 | 5 |
| 64 | Louis Jordaan | Maties | 1 | 0 | 0 | 0 | 5 |
| 64 | Clearance Khumalo | Maties | 1 | 0 | 0 | 0 | 5 |
| 64 | Frederick Kirsten | Maties | 1 | 0 | 0 | 0 | 5 |
| 64 | Tertius Kruger | UFS Shimlas | 1 | 0 | 0 | 0 | 5 |
| 64 | Donnovan Marais | NMMU Madibaz | 1 | 0 | 0 | 0 | 5 |
| 64 | Hoffmann Maritz | NWU Pukke | 1 | 0 | 0 | 0 | 5 |
| 64 | Chris Massyn | UP Tuks | 1 | 0 | 0 | 0 | 5 |
| 64 | Oupa Mohojé | UFS Shimlas | 1 | 0 | 0 | 0 | 5 |
| 64 | Jacques Nel | UJ | 1 | 0 | 0 | 0 | 5 |
| 64 | Justin Pappin | UFS Shimlas | 1 | 0 | 0 | 0 | 5 |
| 64 | Dylan Peterson | UJ | 1 | 0 | 0 | 0 | 5 |
| 64 | Jacques Pretorius | UJ | 1 | 0 | 0 | 0 | 5 |
| 64 | Juan Schoeman | UP Tuks | 1 | 0 | 0 | 0 | 5 |
| 64 | Basil Short | UP Tuks | 1 | 0 | 0 | 0 | 5 |
| 64 | Roelof Smit | UP Tuks | 1 | 0 | 0 | 0 | 5 |
| 64 | Caleb Smith | Maties | 1 | 0 | 0 | 0 | 5 |
| 64 | Joe Smith | NWU Pukke | 1 | 0 | 0 | 0 | 5 |
| 64 | Rudolph Smith | UP Tuks | 1 | 0 | 0 | 0 | 5 |
| 64 | Jade Stighling | UP Tuks | 1 | 0 | 0 | 0 | 5 |
| 64 | HP Swart | NWU Pukke | 1 | 0 | 0 | 0 | 5 |
| 64 | Fanie van der Walt | UFS Shimlas | 1 | 0 | 0 | 0 | 5 |
| 64 | Arno van Wyk | UP Tuks | 1 | 0 | 0 | 0 | 5 |
| 64 | Jacques Vermaak | NWU Pukke | 1 | 0 | 0 | 0 | 5 |
| 64 | Harold Vorster | UJ | 1 | 0 | 0 | 0 | 5 |
| 104 | Jaun Kotzé | UJ | 0 | 0 | 0 | 2 | 4 |
| 105 | James Alexander | UCT Ikey Tigers | 0 | 1 | 0 | 0 | 3 |
| 106 | Rhyno Smith | NWU Pukke | 0 | 0 | 1 | 0 | 2 |
* Legend: T = Tries, C = Conversions, P = Penalties, DG = Drop Goals, Pts = Points

=== Squad lists ===
The teams released the following squad lists:

Maties

Forwards

- Wesley Adonis
- Justin Benn
- Lungelo Chonco
- Tertius Daniller
- Jan de Klerk
- Beyers de Villiers
- Charl de Villiers
- Renier Ehlers
- Neethling Gericke
- Ian Groenewald
- Liam Hendricks
- Nicol Heyns
- Frederick Kirsten
- Boeta Kleinhans
- Helmut Lehmann
- Koos Loubser
- Niel Oelofse
- Brendan Pitzer
- Jurg Streicher
- Wilhelm van der Sluys
- Did not play:
- Brianton Booysen
- Keith Chenoweth
- Tebogo Letlape
- Derick Linde
- Teunis Nieuwoudt
- Grant Prior
- Mark Prior
- Alistair Vermaak

Backs

- Craig Barry
- Bjorn Bernardo
- Robert du Preez
- JW Dürr
- Mark Hodgkiss
- Gerhard Jordaan
- Louis Jordaan
- Clearance Khumalo
- Johnny Kôtze
- Jean Nel
- Louis Nel
- Caleb Smith
- Chris Smith
- Did not play:
- Brandon Asher-Wood
- Ryno Eksteen
- Janco Gunter
- JP Lewis
- Warren Seals

tbc

- Jacobus de Kock
- Lars Esdar
- Dirk Kotzé

Coach

- Chris Rossouw

NMMU Madibaz

Forwards

- Tim Agaba
- André Barnard
- Greg Bauer
- Chris Cloete
- Wade Elliot
- Dexter Fahey
- Martin Ferreira
- Louis Fourie
- Roy Godfrey
- Marcel Groenewald
- Simon Kerrod
- Cameron Lindsay
- Enoch Mnyaka
- Jody Reyneke
- Nic Roebeck
- Stefan Willemse
- Did not play:
- Laurence Christie
- Hannes Huisamen
- Rob Louw
- Marzuq Maarman
- Lumko Mbane
- Arrie van der Berg
- Kewan Voysey
- Stephan Zaayman

Backs

- Enrico Acker
- Tythan Adams
- Michael Bernardt
- Fanie Booysen
- Jarryd Buys
- Aya Dlepu
- Gavin Hauptfleisch
- Andile Jho
- Devon Lailvaux
- Ivan Ludick
- Sinakho Mafu
- Donovan Marais
- Yamkela Ngam
- Matt Tweddle
- Kayle van Zyl
- Did not play:
- Ruan Allerston
- Steven Hansel
- Dwayne Kelly
- Sphu Msutwana
- Juan Smit
- Billy van Lill
- Justin van Staden

Coach

- David Maidza

NWU Pukke

Forwards

- Jaco Buys
- Stompie de Wet
- Marius Fourie
- John-Roy Jenkinson
- Danie Jordaan
- Robey Labuschagné
- Juan Language
- Mash Mafela
- Lucky Ngcamu
- Francois Robertse
- Joe Smith
- HP Swart
- Akker van der Merwe
- Peet van der Walt
- Elardus Venter
- Jacques Vermaak
- Rhyk Welgemoed
- Did not play:
- Wian Fourie
- Anton Krynauw
- SJ Niemand
- Siya November
- Marno Redelinghuys
- Ettienne Smith

Backs

- Lucian Cupido
- Johan Deysel
- Tiaan Dorfling
- Adriaan Engelbrecht
- Sylvian Mahuza
- Edmar Marais
- Hoffmann Maritz
- Akhona Nela
- Luther Obi
- Jaap Pienaar
- Dillon Smit
- Rhyno Smith
- Johnny Welthagen
- Did not play:
- Rowayne Beukman
- Warren Gilbert
- Lloyd Greeff
- Gerhard Nortier
- SW Oosthuizen
- Sarel Smith
- Marnus Tack
- Juandré Williams
- Percy Williams

Coach

- Robert du Preez

UCT Ikey Tigers

Forwards

- Guy Alexander
- Mike Botha
- Joel Carew
- Vince Jobo
- James Kilroe
- Jason Klaasen
- Kyle Kriel
- David Maasch
- Shaun McDonald
- Robin Murray
- Neil Rautenbach
- Chad Solomon
- Jan Uys
- Digby Webb
- Tino Zakeyo
- Msizi Zondi
- Did not play:
- Brad Bosman
- Deacon Chowles
- Gareth Ehret
- Keegan Ehret
- Zolani Faku
- Sean Johnstone
- Mike Kennedy
- Jade Kriel
- Sihle Mtwa
- Wade Schoor

Backs

- James Alexander
- Suwi Chibale
- Dean Grant
- Nick Holton
- Huw Jones
- Ross Jones-Davies
- Nate Nel
- Martin Sauls
- Guy Schwikkard
- Liam Slatem
- Richard Stewart
- Dave Strachan
- Lihleli Xoli
- Did not play:
- Tom Bednall
- Paul Cohen
- Ryan Dugmore
- Paul Hendry
- Trent Jenkinson
- Brendan Rodgers

Coach

- Kevin Musikanth

UFS Shimlas

Forwards

- Dolph Botha
- Gideon Bruwer
- Tienie Burger
- Neil Claassen
- Luan de Bruin
- Jacques du Toit
- Elandré Huggett
- Niell Jordaan
- Armandt Koster
- Oupa Mohojé
- Sihle Ngxabi
- Markus Odendaal
- Gerhard Olivier
- Justin Pappin
- Nick Schonert
- Joe van der Hoogt
- Vaatjie van der Merwe
- Fanie van der Walt
- Henco Venter
- Did not play:
- Marco Klopper

Backs

- AJ Coertzen
- Pieter-Steyn de Wet
- Maphutha Dolo
- Franna du Toit
- Joubert Engelbrecht
- Ludwig Erasmus
- Kay-Kay Hlongwane
- Tertius Kruger
- Kevin Luiters
- Gouws Prinsloo
- Divandré Strydom
- Sethu Tom
- Vink van der Walt
- Robbie van Schalkwyk
- Did not play:
- Marco Mason
- Zee Mkhabela
- Don Mlondobozi
- Francois Pretorius
- Arthur Williams

Coach

- Michael Horak

UJ

Forwards

- David Antonites
- Fabian Booysen
- Van Zyl Botha
- Henna Bredenkamp
- François du Toit
- Jeremy Jordaan
- Wiseman Kamanga
- Shane Kirkwood
- Tiaan Macdonald
- Devon Marthinus
- Dylan Peterson
- Ryan Plasket
- Kobus Porter
- Mark Pretorius
- Victor Sekekete
- Jannes Snyman
- JP Swanepoel
- Rynhardt van Wyk
- Did not play:
- Phanta Qinisile
- Ramon Samuels
- Lodewyk Uys

Backs

- Robert de Bruyn
- JR Esterhuizen
- Michael Haznar
- Jaun Kotzé
- Pieter Morton
- Jacques Nel
- Andries Oosthuizen
- Jacques Pretorius
- Marais Schmidt
- Jaco van der Walt
- Vian van der Watt
- Lukas van Zyl
- Harold Vorster
- PJ Walters
- Did not play:
- Kallie Erasmus
- Selom Gavor
- Adrian Vermeulen

Coach

- Skollie Janse van Rensburg

UP Tuks

Forwards

- Brummer Badenhorst
- Andrew Beerwinkel
- Leneve Damens
- Corniel Els
- Neethling Fouché
- Irné Herbst
- Reniel Hugo
- Jono Janse van Rensburg
- Jannes Kirsten
- Wiaan Liebenberg
- Chris Massyn
- Juan Schoeman
- Basil Short
- Roelof Smit
- Rudolph Smith
- Sidney Tobias
- Arno van Wyk
- Jaco Visagie
- Dennis Visser
- Did not play:
- Jarrett Crouch
- Christiaan de Bruin
- Pierre Schoeman

Backs

- Carlo Engelbrecht
- Warrick Gelant
- Rohan Janse van Rensburg
- Kefentse Mahlo
- Duncan Matthews
- Ryan Nell
- Burger Odendaal
- Jacques Rossouw
- Tian Schoeman
- Jade Stighling
- Dries Swanepoel
- Emile Temperman
- Francois Tredoux
- Did not play:
- Enver Brandt
- Riaan Britz
- Kobus Marais
- Clinton Swart
- André Warner

Coach

- Pote Human

Wits

Forwards

- Rinus Bothma
- JJ Breet
- Conor Brockschmidt
- Senna Esterhuizen
- Jason Fraser
- JP Jonck
- Ferdinand Kelly
- Ashley Kohler
- Hannes Ludick
- James Marx
- Thato Mavundla
- Devin Montgomery
- Gideon Muller
- Rendani Ramovha
- Pieter van Biljon
- Kyle Wood
- Did not play:
- KK Kgame
- Max Mhamhe
- Luvuyo Pupuma
- Cameron Shafto
- Phaka Zuma

Backs

- Riaan Arends
- Brent Crossley
- Ashlon Davids
- Mandla Dube
- Jacques Erasmus
- Divan Ferguson
- Nkuli Gamede
- Joshua Jarvis
- Ruhan Nel
- Wilton Pietersen
- Matt Torrance
- Did not play:
- Alistair Ballantyne
- Greg Blom
- Ryno Brits
- Kenneth du Plessis
- Grant Janke
- Jared Meyer
- Ish Nkolo
- Lonwabo Semane

Coach

- Andy Royle

== Referees ==
The following referees officiated matches in the 2014 Varsity Cup:

- Rodney Boneparte
- Ben Crouse
- Gerrie de Bruin
- Christie du Preez
- Daniel Fortuin
- Stephan Geldenhuys
- Quinton Immelman
- Cwengile Jadezweni
- Jaco Kotze
- Pro Legoete
- Eduan Nel
- Tahla Ntshakaza
- Francois Pretorius
- Jaco Pretorius
- Oregopotse Rametsi
- Rasta Rasivhenge
- Archie Sehlako
- Lourens van der Merwe
- Marius van der Westhuizen
- Jaco van Heerden

== Honours ==
| 2014 FNB Varsity Cup Champions: | UCT Ikey Tigers |
| Player That Rocks: | Robert du Preez, Maties |
| Forward That Rocks: | Shaun McDonald, UCT Ikey Tigers |
| Back That Rocks: | Sylvian Mahuza, NWU Pukke |
| Top Try Scorer: | Chris Cloete, NMMU Madibaz (8) |
| Top Points Scorer: | Robert du Preez, Maties (84) |

== See also ==
- Varsity Cup
- 2014 Varsity Rugby
- 2014 Varsity Shield
- 2014 SARU Community Cup
- 2014 Vodacom Cup
