= Fabian Booysen =

South African rugby union player

- Full name: Fabian Connal Frazer Booysen
- Born: 21 March 1992 (age 34) Caledon, South Africa
- Height: 1.90 m (6 ft 3 in)
- Weight: 103 kg (16 st 3 lb; 227 lb)
- School: Hoërskool Florida, Roodepoort
- University: University of Johannesburg

Rugby union career
- Position: Flanker / Number eight
Youth career
- 2009–2013: Golden Lions
Amateur team(s)
Years	Team	Apps	(Points)
2013–2014	UJ	9	(0)
Senior career
Years	Team	Apps	(Points)
2012–2017	Golden Lions XV	19 (Note: According to the SA Rugby Annual 2013, Booysen also came on as a hooker replacement in the 2012 Vodacom Cup match against the Blue Bulls. However, according to the South African Rugby Union website, it was François du Toit, whose regular position is hooker. This potential appearance has been excluded from Booysen's appearance stats.)	(25)
2012–2017	Golden Lions	26	(10)
2016	Lions	2	(0)
2018	SWD Eagles	3	(0)
- Correct as of 13 July 2018
International career
Years	Team	Apps	(Points)
2010	South Africa Schools	2	(0)
2012	South Africa Under-20	5	(0)
2013	South African Universities	1	(0)
- Correct as of 16 April 2018

Fabian Connal Frazer Booysen (born 21 March 1992) is a South African professional rugby union player who last played for the SWD Eagles in the Currie Cup and Rugby Challenge competitions. His regular position is flanker or number eight.

== Career ==
=== 2009–2010 : Craven Week and South Africa Under-18 ===
Booysen attended Hoërskool Florida in Roodepoort, which is in the catchment area of the Golden Lions. He was selected to represent them at the premier high school rugby union competition in South Africa, the Under-18 Craven Week in both the 2009 tournament held in East London and the 2010 tournament in Welkom. He scored one try in each of their matches against the Blue Bulls and the Pumas in the 2010 event and was selected in a South Africa Under-18 High Performance squad after the tournament and Booysen represented South Africa in victories over France and England.

=== 2011 : Under-19 ===
Booysen joined the Golden Lions Academy after finishing school and made ten appearances for the Golden Lions U19 side during the 2011 Under-19 Provincial Championship, scoring one try in a 25–37 defeat to their trans-Jukskei rivals the Blue Bulls U19 and helping his side finish second on the log to qualify for the semi-finals. He played off the bench in their 32–27 semi-final victory over Western Province U21s, as well as in the final, where they became champions by beating the Blue Bulls U21s 20–19. He played in the U20 tournament and the final against the Baby Blacks in 2012 as a stand-out player, which SA won, after that he never featured in any major representative teams.

=== 2012 : Vodacom Cup and South Africa Under-18 ===
Booysen made his first class debut on 10 March 2012 by coming on as a late replacement for the Golden Lions in their 2012 Vodacom Cup match against the Leopards in Potchefstroom, finishing the match on the losing side as the Leopards triumphed 23–16.

Booysen was then selected in the South Africa Under-20 squad for the 2012 IRB Junior World Championship, which was hosted in South Africa for the first time. He started their first match as the hosts got off to a bad start, losing 19–23 to Ireland in Pool B of the competition. He played off the bench as South Africa recovered to beat Italy 52–3 in their second match and started their 28–15 victory over previously-unbeaten England to finish top of the log and qualify for the semi-finals. He started their semi-final match as they easily dispatched Argentina, winning 35–3, as well as the final, which South Africa won 22–16 against New Zealand to win the competition for the first time and ending New Zealand's four-year reign as champions.

Booysen returned to domestic action for the Golden Lions U21s and made eight appearances during the 2012 Under-21 Provincial Championship. The Golden Lions finished in fifth spot on the log, failing to qualify for the semi-finals.

=== 2013–2014 : Under-21 and UJ ===
Booysen started the 2013 season representing university side UJ in the 2013 Varsity Cup. He made five appearances for the side as they finished third on the log to qualify for the semi-finals, where they suffered a 24–61 defeat to eventual champions UP Tuks.

Booysen made his first domestic senior start in the 2013 Vodacom Cup, suffering a 19–30 defeat to the Griffons in a competition that the Golden Lions would eventually go on to win, beating the Pumas 42–28 in the final.

His performances in the 2013 Varsity Cup didn't go unnoticed and Booysen was named in a South African Universities team that played a one-off match against Namibia in Windhoek. The South African Universities side ran out 50–39 winners.

Booysen made twelve appearances for the Golden Lions U21s during the 2013 Under-21 Provincial Championship, contributing one try in their 76–7 victory over Border U21 in their final round-robin match as they finished fourth to qualify for the semi-finals. He started their semi-final match against Western Province, which required extra time to separate the teams, with Western Province eventually prevailing 44–41.

Booysen's playing time in 2014 was limited to four appearances off the bench for UJ during the 2014 Varsity Cup, which saw his side struggle, finishing second last and requiring a relegation play-off series victory over UKZN Impi to remain in the competition. He was named in the Golden Lions' Vodacom Cup and Currie Cup squads, but failed to appear in any of their matches.

=== 2015 : Vodacom Cup and Currie Cup ===
Booysen returned to first class action in the 2015 Vodacom Cup, making a single appearance in their 63–10 victory over the Leopards in Johannesburg. The Golden Lions reached the semi-final of the competition, where they lost to the Pumas.

Booysen was named in the Golden Lions' squad for the 2015 Currie Cup Premier Division and was included in the starting line-up for the Golden Lions' Round Two match against the Pumas.
