= Neil Rautenbach =

South African rugby union player

- Born: 17 May 1991 (age 35) Cape Town, South Africa
- Height: 1.78 m (5 ft 10 in)
- Weight: 98 kg (15 st 6 lb; 216 lb)
- School: Paarl Boys' High School
- University: Cape Peninsula University of Technology

Rugby union career
- Position: Hooker
- Current team: Boland Cavaliers
Youth career
- 2007–2012: Western Province
Amateur team(s)
Years	Team	Apps	(Points)
2011–2014	UCT Ikey Tigers	16	(0)
Senior career
Years	Team	Apps	(Points)
2014–2015	Western Province	15	(0)
2015	Stormers	3	(0)
2015	Free State Cheetahs	4	(0)
2016	Griffons	5	(5)
2016	Free State XV	1	(5)
2016	Western Province	4	(0)
2019–present	Boland Cavaliers	12	(15)
- Correct as of 25 August 2019
International career
Years	Team	Apps	(Points)
2012	South Africa Students	2	(0)
- Correct as of 1 April 2015

Neil Rautenbach (born 17 May 1991 in Cape Town, South Africa) is a Namibian South African-born rugby union player for the Boland Cavaliers in the Currie Cup and the Rugby Challenge. His regular position is hooker.

== Career ==
=== Youth and Varsity Cup rugby ===
He represented Western Province at high school level, playing for their Under-16 side at the Grant Khomo Week in 2007 and for their Under-18 Craven Week side in 2009. He joined their academy and played for the Western Province U19 side in the 2010 Under-19 Provincial Championship and for the Western Province U21 side in the 2011 and 2012 Under-21 Provincial Championships.

He also played Varsity Cup rugby for the UCT Ikey Tigers since 2011, winning the competition with them twice in 2011 (during which he made just one appearance, but was named on the bench for the final) and 2014, when he made nine appearances and played the first 72 of the final as they secured a dramatic 39–33 comeback victory.

=== Western Province ===
He made his first class debut in the 2014 Vodacom Cup competition, starting their quarter-final match against the Pumas in Nelspruit. That turned out to be his only appearance in the competition, as Western Province lost 13–8.

He was included in their squad for the 2014 Currie Cup Premier Division and named on the bench for their Round Two clash against the Blue Bulls.

=== Free State Cheetahs ===
Rautenbach signed a contract to join the Free State Cheetahs from 1 July 2015.

=== Representative rugby ===
In October 2014, Rautenbach was called up to the Namibian national team for the first time prior to their end-of-year tour to Europe.
