= Juan Schoeman =

South African rugby union player

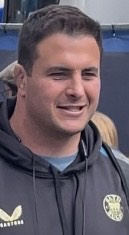
- Full name: Juan Louw Schoeman
- Born: 18 September 1991 (age 35) Pretoria, South Africa
- Height: 1.86 m (6 ft 1 in)
- Weight: 110 kg (17 st 5 lb; 243 lb)
- School: Afrikaanse Hoër Seunskool, Pretoria
- University: University of South Africa / University of Pretoria
- Notable relative: Pierre Schoeman (brother)

Rugby union career
- Position: Loosehead prop
- Current team: Bath
Youth career
- 2008–2012: Blue Bulls
Amateur team(s)
Years	Team	Apps	(Points)
2011–2015	UP Tuks	29	(20)
Senior career
Years	Team	Apps	(Points)
2011–2014	Blue Bulls	9	(0)
2015–2019	Sharks (Currie Cup)	30	(10)
2016–2019	Sharks	39	(5)
2016–2018	Sharks XV	17	(5)
2019–2020	Southern Kings	6	(0)
2020–2024	Bath	64	(5)
2024–	Golden Lions	14	(0)
2024–	Lions	19	(5)
- Correct as of 26 October 2026
International career
Years	Team	Apps	(Points)
2009	S.A. Under-18 High Performance	1	(5)
2011	South Africa Under-20	3	(0)
- Correct as of 31 July 2014

Juan Louw Schoeman (born 18 September 1991 in Pretoria, South Africa) is a South African rugby union player for the Bath in Premiership Rugby. His regular position is loosehead prop.

== Career ==
=== Youth and Varsity Cup rugby ===
He represented the Blue Bulls at various youth levels. In 2008 and 2009, he was named in the Blue Bulls Under-18 Craven Week squads.

After the 2009 tournament, he was also named in a South Africa Schools High Performance squad that played against their Namibian counterparts, with Schoeman scoring one of thirteen tries in a 93–10 demolition.

He was included in the Blue Bulls U19 squad for the Under-19 Provincial Championships in 2009 and 2010, scoring two tries in fourteen starts in 2010.

In 2011, he was selected in the South Africa Under-20 side that competed at the 2011 IRB Junior World Championship in Italy. He started their pool matches against Scotland and England, as well as their 5th-placed play-off match against Fiji, helping his side to a 104–17 victory.

Upon his return to domestic action, he played for the Blue Bulls U21 side in the 2011 and 2012 Under-21 Provincial Championships, making 22 starts in total.

He also played Varsity Cup rugby for the UP Tuks, making 25 appearances for them between 2011 and 2014.

=== Blue Bulls ===
Schoeman made his first class debut for the Blue Bulls during the 2011 Currie Cup Premier Division, shortly after his return from the 2011 IRB Junior World Championship. He played off the bench in their match against the Sharks in Durban.

However, his next appearance only came during the 2014 Vodacom Cup competition, when he started seven of their matches.

=== Sharks ===
In 2015, he was named in the Sharks squad prior to the 2015 Currie Cup Premier Division.

=== Bath ===
After a period on loan to Southern Kings. Schoeman signed for Premiership Rugby team Bath.
