= Vince Jobo =

- Full name: Vincent Thabiso Jobo
- Born: 1 February 1991 (age 35) Krugersdorp, South Africa
- Height: 1.86 m (6 ft 1 in)
- Weight: 104 kg (16 st 5 lb; 229 lb)
- School: King Edward VII School
- University: University of Johannesburg / University of Cape Town

Rugby union career
- Position: Flanker / Number eight
- Current team: New Orleans Gold
Youth career
- 2006–2011: Golden Lions
- 2012: Western Province
Amateur team(s)
Years	Team	Apps	(Points)
2013–2014	UCT Ikey Tigers	8	(5)
2017–present	Austin Blacks	0	(0)
Senior career
Years	Team	Apps	(Points)
2013	Western Province	1	(0)
2014–2015	Free State Cheetahs	5	(15)
2015	Free State XV	6	(10)
2016	Falcons	6	(0)
2016	Eastern Province Kings	6	(5)
2018–present	New Orleans Gold	0	(0)
- Correct as of 9 October 2016

Vincent Thabiso Jobo (born 1 February 1991 in Krugersdorp, South Africa) was a former South African rugby union player, and former American Major League Rugby side New Orleans Gold. His regular position was flanker or number eight.

== Career ==
=== Golden Lions / UJ ===
He represented Johannesburg-based side the Golden Lions at various youth levels while at school; he was included in their Under-16 side for the Grant Khomo Week competitions in 2006 and 2007, in 2008 he played for them at the Under-18 Academy Week and in 2009, he represented them at the Under-18 Craven Week competition.

He joined their academy and played for the Golden Lions U19 side in the 2010 Under-19 Provincial Championship and was named in the Golden Lions U21 squad for the 2011 Under-21 Provincial Championship, but did not play in any matches. He was also named in the UJ squad for the 2012 Varsity Cup competition, but failed to make any appearances.

=== Western Province / UCT Ikey Tigers ===
During 2012, Jobo moved to Cape Town where he joined Western Province. He played off the bench on six occasions for them during the 2012 Under-21 Provincial Championship, scoring a try in their match against his former side, the Golden Lions U21.

He made his first class debut for Western Province during the 2013 Vodacom Cup, playing off the bench in their match against Boland Cavaliers in Ceres, helping them to come from behind to salvage a 17–17 draw.

In 2014, he played for the UCT Ikey Tigers in the 2014 Varsity Cup competition. He played in eight matches for Ikeys during the competition, scoring a try against UJ as he helped the side reach the final. He also featured in the final against NWU Pukke in Potchefstroom, where UCT fought back from 33–15 down with five minutes to go to score a 39–33 victory.

=== Free State Cheetahs ===
He joined Bloemfontein-based side for the duration of the 2014 Currie Cup Premier Division and he was named on the bench for their Round Three clash against the Sharks.
