= Basil Short =

South African rugby union player

- Full name: Basil Gordon Short
- Born: 19 May 1991 (age 35) Vryheid, South Africa
- Height: 1.89 m (6 ft 2 1/2 in)
- Weight: 118 kg (260 lb; 18 st 8 lb)
- School: Standerton High School, Standerton
- University: University of Pretoria

Rugby union career
- Position: Prop
Youth career
- 2011–2012: Blue Bulls
Amateur team(s)
Years	Team	Apps	(Points)
2012–2014	UP Tuks	17	(15)
Senior career
Years	Team	Apps	(Points)
2012–2015	Blue Bulls	26	(10)
2015	→ Eastern Province Kings	3	(0)
2016	Boland Cavaliers	19	(5)
2017–2018	SWD Eagles	10	(0)
- Correct as of 13 July 2018

Basil Gordon Short (born 19 May 1991 in Vryheid, South Africa) is a South African rugby union player who last played for the SWD Eagles. His regular position is prop.

== Career ==
=== Youth ===
Short played at Under-21 level for the Blue Bulls in the 2011 Under-21 Provincial Championship and the 2012 Under-21 Provincial Championship competitions, helping the Blue Bulls to win both those competitions.

He also played Varsity Cup rugby for the Pretoria-based university side UP Tuks between 2012 and 2014, picking up a winner's medal in the first two seasons. He was also included in a South African Universities side in 2013.

=== Blue Bulls ===
His first class debut came during the 2012 Vodacom Cup competition. He came off the bench during the second half of their match against Griquas at Loftus Versfeld. He scored his first try in first class rugby two weeks later against Gauteng rivals the Golden Lions in the same competition and made seven appearances in total.

A further two appearances followed during the 2013 Vodacom Cup competition and an additional seven in the 2014 Vodacom Cup.

=== Boland Cavaliers ===
He joined Wellington-based side Boland Cavaliers for the 2016 season.
