= Danie Jordaan =

South African rugby union player (born 1991)

- Full name: Daniel Barend Jordaan
- Born: 25 January 1991 (age 35) Johannesburg, South Africa
- Height: 1.98 m (6 ft 6 in)
- Weight: 117 kg (18 st 6 lb; 258 lb)
- School: Hoërskool Fochville, Fochville
- University: North-West University

Rugby union career
- Position: Lock
Youth career
- 2008: Golden Lions
- 2010–2011: Blue Bulls
- 2010: → Falcons
- 2011–2012: Leopards
Amateur team(s)
Years	Team	Apps	(Points)
2012–present	NWU Pukke	24	(15)
Senior career
Years	Team	Apps	(Points)
2012–2016	Leopards	15	(0)
2014–2015	Leopards XV	5	(0)
- Correct as of 9 October 2016

Daniel Barend Jordaan (born 25 January 1991) is a South African professional rugby union player who played first class rugby with the Leopards between 2012 and 2016. His regular position is lock.

== Career ==
=== Youth ===
After representing the Golden Lions at the Under-18 Academy Week competition in 2008, he moved across the Jukskei River to join the Blue Bulls academy, but only made two appearances for the Blue Bulls U19 side in the 2010 Under-19 Provincial Championship. Jordaan also played a few matches for the Falcons U19s in the same competition. In 2011 and 2012, he represented the Leopards U21 side in the Under-21 Provincial Championship.

=== NWU Pukke / Leopards ===
After making one appearance for the Potchefstroom-based Varsity Cup side NWU Pukke in 2012, he also made his first senior appearance for provincial side the Leopards, coming on as a late replacement in their 28–31 defeat to the Falcons in Kempton Park during the 2012 Vodacom Cup, before playing at Under-21 level in the second half of the year.

Six appearances for NWU Pukke in the 2013 Varsity Cup was followed up by his first appearance in the Currie Cup competition, coming on as a replacement in their 2013 Currie Cup First Division match against the Pumas in a 20–38 defeat in Nelspruit.

Jordaan played seven times for NWU Pukke in the 2014 Varsity Cup as they reached the final of the competition, where they were beaten by the UCT Ikey Tigers, and made a further two substitute appearances in the 2014 Vodacom Cup. He didn't feature in the Leopards' 2014 Currie Cup qualification campaign, as Griquas pipped the Leopards by a single point to earn a spot in the 2014 Currie Cup Premier Division, but he did make five starts for the Leopards in the 2014 Currie Cup First Division, helping them to finish top of the log, but losing to the fourth-placed Falcons in the semi-finals.

Another seven appearances for NWU Pukke followed in the 2015 Varsity Cup, with the side emulating their 2014 performance to reach the final of the competition, where they lost to UFS Shimlas. Jordaan then featured in three matches in the 2015 Vodacom Cup, as they qualified for the quarter finals, where they were eliminated by Western Province.
