= Neil Claassen =

South African rugby union player

- Born: 26 September 1992 (age 34) Pretoria, South Africa
- Height: 1.97 m (6 ft 5 1/2 in)
- Weight: 100 kg (15 st 10 lb; 220 lb)
- School: HTS Daniel Pienaar, Uitenhage Paarl Gimnasium 2010(Paarl)
- University: Freestate

Rugby union career
- Position: Lock / Flanker
Youth career
- 2008: Eastern Province Kings
- 2011–2013: Free State Cheetahs
Amateur team(s)
Years	Team	Apps	(Points)
2014–2016	UFS Shimlas	20	(15)
Senior career
Years	Team	Apps	(Points)
2012–2016	Free State XV	16	(10)
2014	Free State Cheetahs	10	(0)
2017–2018	Griffons	30	(35)
- Correct as of 27 October 2018
International career
Years	Team	Apps	(Points)
2008	South Africa Under-16 Elite Squad		
- Correct as of 30 July 2014

Neil Claassen (born 26 September 1992 in Pretoria, South Africa) is a South African rugby union player who last played for the Griffons. His regular position is lock or flanker.

== Career ==
=== Youth and Varsity Cup rugby ===
He was a member of the Eastern Province side that participated at the Under-16 Grant Khomo Week in 2008. His performance in the tournament also earned him an inclusion in an Under-16 Elite Squad in the same year.

He played for youth sides for Bloemfontein-based side, the Free State Cheetahs. He played for the Free State U19 side in the 2011 Under-19 Provincial Championship, also captaining the side. He progressed to the Free State U21 squad and started 25 matches for them during the 2012 and 2013 Under-21 Provincial Championships, also scoring six tries for them during the 2013 competition to make him his side's top try scorer for the competition. This six-try haul also included a brace against eventual champions Western Province U21.

In 2014, he represented Varsity Cup side UFS Shimlas, scoring three tries in seven starts for the university side.

=== Free State Cheetahs ===
Claassen's first class debut came during the 2012 Vodacom Cup competition. He started two matches for the Free State XV during the competition, a 34–30 victory over the SWD Eagles and a 30–32 defeat to the Boland Cavaliers in Bredasdorp a week later. He made a further seven first class appearances during the 2013 Vodacom Cup and also scored his first try in their match against the SWD Eagles.

After his spell with UFS Shimlas in the 2014 Varsity Cup, he returned to the Free State XV side to make three appearances towards the end of the 2014 Vodacom Cup competition, weighing in with one try in their 54–17 win against the Border Bulldogs.

He was included in their Currie Cup squad for the first time prior to the 2014 Currie Cup Premier Division season.
