= Louis Fourie =

Louis Fourie may refer to:

- Louis Fourie (rugby union) (born 1991), South African rugby union player
- Louis Fourie (born 1962), South African-born Ireland cricket umpire
