= Tian Schoeman =

South African rugby union player (born 1991)

- Full name: Christian Francois Schoeman
- Born: 23 September 1991 (age 35) Pretoria, South Africa
- Height: 1.82 m (5 ft 11 1/2 in)
- Weight: 94 kg (14 st 11 lb; 207 lb)
- School: HTS John Vorster, Pretoria
- University: University of Pretoria

Rugby union career
- Position: Fly-half
- Current team: Unattached
Youth career
- 2010: Pumas
- 2011–2012: Blue Bulls
Amateur team(s)
Years	Team	Apps	(Points)
2013–2014	UP Tuks	11	(71)
Senior career
Years	Team	Apps	(Points)
2013–2016	Blue Bulls	29	(369)
2015–2017	Bulls	35	(153)
2017	Blue Bulls XV	1	(17)
2017–2018	Bordeaux	15	(42)
2018–2020	Free State Cheetahs	9	(58)
2018–2020	Cheetahs	39	(195)
2021–2022	Bath	6	(4)
2022–2023	Newcastle Falcons	17	(48)
- Correct as of 15 June 2023

Christian Francois Schoeman (born 23 September 1991 in Pretoria, South Africa) is a South African rugby union player. His regular position is fly-half.

== Career ==
=== Youth ===
Schoeman played for Witbank-based outfit the Pumas in the 2010 Under-19 Provincial Championship. He scored 69 points in just six matches for the Pumas U19 side to finish as the top scorer in Group B of the competition, 17 points ahead of Arno Poley of the Falcons U19.

In 2011, he moved back to Pretoria to join the Blue Bulls. Despite not playing for them in 2011, he made a big impact during the 2012 Under-21 Provincial Championship, contributing 115 points for the Blue Bulls U21 – third behind the Sharks U21s Fred Zeilinga and the Golden Lions U21s Marais Schmidt – to help the Blue Bulls clinch the title in this competition, scoring 14 points with the boot as they beat Western Province U21 22–13 in the final.

=== Varsity Cup ===
Schoeman represented university side UP Tuks in the 2013 Varsity Cup competition, scoring 23 points in the first four rounds of the competition before Handré Pollard was given a chance for the latter rounds of the competition, which UP Tuks eventually went on to win. He was the first-choice fly-half throughout the 2014 Varsity Cup however, scoring 48 points in his seven appearances, but failing to help his side qualify for the quarter-finals.

=== Blue Bulls ===
Schoeman was included in the Blue Bulls squad for the 2013 Currie Cup Premier Division season and was even named on the bench for their match against the Sharks, but failed to make an appearance.

At the conclusion of the 2014 Varsity Cup, he was included in the Blue Bulls 2014 Vodacom Cup squad. He made his first class debut for them in their match against Gauteng rivals Falcons and contributed 24 points to his side's 54–7 win, scoring a try and kicking five conversions and two penalties. Despite missing the first four rounds of the competition, he ended the competition in sixth place on the scorers list, contributing 60 points in five appearances.

His Currie Cup debut came during the 2014 Currie Cup Premier Division season, as he played off the bench in the second half of their match against Western Province. He kicked two late penalties but that was not enough to stop the Blue Bulls go down 23–18.

In 2015, he was also included in the Bulls squad for the 2015 Super Rugby season and he was named on the bench for their Round Three match against the Sharks in Pretoria.

=== Bordeaux ===
Schoeman joined Top 14 side Bordeaux prior to the 2017–18 Top 14 season. He scored 42 points in 15 matches for the team in his only season at the club.

=== Cheetahs ===
Schoeman returned to South Africa to join the Cheetahs prior to the 2018–19 Pro14, signing a contract with the Bloemfontein-based franchise until October 2020.

=== Bath ===
On 18 January 2021, it was confirmed that Schoeman had joined Premiership Rugby side Bath with immediate effect.

=== Newcastle Falcons ===
He played for Newcastle Falcons from 2022 to 2023.
