= Shane Kirkwood =

South African rugby union player

- Full name: Shane Monro Kirkwood
- Born: 6 September 1989 (age 37) Alberton, South Africa
- Height: 1.95 m (6 ft 5 in)
- Weight: 115 kg (18 st 2 lb; 254 lb)
- School: Hoërskool Marais Viljoen, Alberton
- University: University of Johannesburg

Rugby union career
- Position: Lock
- Current team: Pumas
Youth career
- 2007–2010: Golden Lions
Amateur team(s)
| Years | Team | Apps | (Points) |
| 2011–2014 | UJ | 31 | (15) |
Senior career
| Years | Team | Apps | (Points) |
| 2009 | Golden Lions XV | 3 | (5) |
| 2013–2019 | Falcons | 109 | (120) |
| 2019–2021 | Bourgoin | 36 | (5) |
| 2021–2025 | Pumas | 62 | (10) |
- Correct as of 10 July 2022

Shane Monro Kirkwood (born 6 September 1989) is a South African professional rugby union player for Bourgoin in the Fédérale 1 in France. He regularly plays as a lock.

== Career ==
=== Golden Lions / UJ ===
Kirkwood was selected to represent the Golden Lions at the 2007 Under-18 Craven Week tournament held in Stellenbosch. Later in the same year, he was also included in the Golden Lions U19 squad that played in the Under-19 Provincial Championship, a competition in which he also played, in 2008.

Kirkwood got his first taste of first class action during the 2009 Vodacom Cup competition when he made three appearances as a replacement for the Golden Lions. His debut came on 7 March 2009 against the Pumas in a match in Randfontein. He came on as a substitute after 54 minutes and took just 13 minutes to score his first senior try, scoring one of five tries in a 34–47 defeat. He made a further two appearances in the competition in matches against the Griffons and the Falcons. In the second half of the year, he represented the Golden Lions U21s in the 2009 Under-21 Provincial Championship, as he did in 2010 without featuring again at first class level.

Kirkwood also joined university side UJ for the 2011 Varsity Cup competition. He quickly established himself as a key player for UJ, playing in seven of their eight matches in the competition as they reached the semi-finals. Eight appearances and two tries followed in the 2012 Varsity Cup and he started all eight of their matches in the 2013 Varsity Cup, helping UJ reach the semi-finals on both occasions. He played in all seven of their matches in the 2014 Varsity Cup, where a disappointing season resulted them having to beat UKZN Impi in a relegation play-off match to retain their Varsity Cup status.

=== Falcons ===
After the 2013 Varsity Cup, Kirkwood once again became involved at provincial level, joining the Golden Lions' near-neighbours, Kempton Park-based side Falcons, for the 2013 Currie Cup First Division season. He made his Falcons debut – and his first senior match for more than four years – in their season-opening match against the Griffons. The match ended in a 30-all draw, but Kirkwood's debut was marred by a yellow card he received in the 12th minute of the match. He scored his first senior try in their third match of the season, a 37–38 defeat to the SWD Eagles in Kempton Park. He made a total of nine starts during their campaign as the Falcons disappointingly finished bottom of the log.

Despite missing part of the 2014 Vodacom Cup season due to his involvement in the Varsity Cup, Kirkwood made three appearances in the competition and also scored a try in his only start of the campaign, a 34–64 loss to eventual champions Griquas. The Falcons then participated in the 2014 Currie Cup qualification competition; the winner of the competition would qualify to the 2014 Currie Cup Premier Division, but the Falcons finished in sixth position to remain in the 2014 Currie Cup First Division. Kirkwood started all six of their qualification matches and also scored a try in their 52–34 victory against the SWD Eagles in George. He also started all of their games in the First Division, also scoring a try against the Griffons in a 36–27 win, a result that played a large part in seeing them qualify for the semi-finals of the competition. Kirkwood started the semi-final match against the Leopards in Potchefstroom, where the Falcons caused an upset by winning 31–24 to progress to the final. However, they fell just short against the Griffons in the final, losing 21–23.
