= Jason Fraser =

Zimbabwe international rugby union player

- Full name: Jason-Collin Fraser
- Born: 15 April 1991 (age 35) Amanzimtoti, South Africa
- Height: 1.96 m (6 ft 5 in)
- Weight: 108 kg (17 st 0 lb; 238 lb)
- School: Sutherland High School, Centurion
- University: Eta College

Rugby union career
- Position: Flanker / Number eight
- Current team: USO Nevers
Youth career
- 2009: Blue Bulls
- 2010: Sharks
- 2012: Golden Lions
Amateur team(s)
Years	Team	Apps	(Points)
2011–2014	Wits	21	(25)
Senior career
Years	Team	Apps	(Points)
2014	Boland Cavaliers	8	(0)
2015	Pumas	18	(15)
2016–2017	Griquas	30	(50)
2017–present	USO Nevers	154	(90)
- Correct as of 9 August 2025
International career
Years	Team	Apps	(Points)
2022-	Zimbabwe	6	(0)
- Correct as of 19 July 2025

Jason-Collin Fraser (born 15 April 1991 in Amanzimtoti, South Africa) is a South African-born Zimbabwean international rugby union player, currently playing with Nevers in the French Pro D2. His regular position is flanker or number eight.

== Career ==
=== Varsity Rugby ===
Fraser was a member of the Wits since it joined the newly formed second tier of the Varsity Rugby competition, the Varsity Shield, in 2011. In the inaugural season of the competition, Fraser helped Wits top the log after the group stage of the competition and also played in the final, where they lost 18–25 to CUT Ixias.

In the 2012 Varsity Shield competition, Fraser made eight starts and scored a try against UFH Blues as the side finished in second place, but reversed the result of the previous season, beating CUT Ixias 19–17 to win the Varsity Shield competition and win promotion to the 2013 Varsity Cup. Fraser also linked up with the Golden Lions U21 side, making one appearance for them in their 2012 Under-21 Provincial Championship match against Western Province U21.

Despite a tough season in the 2013 Varsity Cup competition that saw Wits lose all seven of their matches, he made six appearances and scored two tries in their final match against UCT Ikey Tigers to help secure Wits a four-try bonus point, the only points they picked up during the campaign. Their fortunes only marginally improved in the 2014 Varsity Cup, again finishing bottom and picking up just two losing bonus points. Fraser once again scored two tries – the second of those coming in a 15–18 defeat to Maties, Wits' narrowest defeat of the competition.

=== Boland Cavaliers ===
Fraser's performances didn't go unnoticed, however, and he signed for Wellington-based side Boland Cavaliers before their 2014 Currie Cup qualification campaign. He made his first class debut for Boland in their match against Griffons in Welkom in a 25–27 loss. He made a further appearance from the bench against the SWD Eagles before making his first start against the Falcons. Boland eventually finished fifth in the qualification competition and therefore consigned to a season in the Currie Cup First Division, with Fraser making a further five appearances in that competition as Boland finished fifth to miss out on a semi-final spot.

=== Pumas ===
In 2015, he joined Nelspruit-based outfit Pumas prior to the 2015 Vodacom Cup. He was a member of the Pumas side that won the Vodacom Cup for the first time in 2015, beating Western Province 24–7 in the final. Fraser made eight appearances during the season, scoring two tries.

=== Griquas ===
He signed a contract to join Kimberley-based side Griquas prior to the 2016 season.
