= Dylan Peterson =

Dylan Peterson may refer to:

- Dylan Peterson (rugby union) (born 1990)
- Dylan Peterson (ice hockey) (born 2002)
