= Jaun Kotzé =

South African rugby union player

- Born: 18 May 1992 (age 34) Messina, South Africa
- Height: 1.74 m (5 ft 8 1/2 in)
- Weight: 85 kg (13 st 5 lb; 187 lb)
- School: Ben Vorster, Tzaneen

Rugby union career
- Position: Fly-half / Fullback
- Current team: Beaune
Youth career
- 2011: Falcons
Amateur team(s)
Years	Team	Apps	(Points)
2012	TUT Vikings	1	(0)
2014	UJ	6	(9)
Senior career
Years	Team	Apps	(Points)
2011–2015	Falcons	73	(567)
2015–2016	Lazio	14	(76)
2017–2018	Griffons	22	(192)
2018–present	Beaune	0	(0)
- Correct as of 13 July 2018
International career
Years	Team	Apps	(Points)
2008	SA Elite Squad		
- Correct as of 18 July 2014

Jaun Kotzé (born 18 May 1992 in Musina, South Africa) is a South African rugby union player, playing with Beaune in the Fédérale 1 in France. His regular position is fly-half.

== Career ==
=== Youth and Varsity Cup rugby ===
In 2008, he was selected for the Limpopo Blue Bulls side that played at the Under-16 Grant Khomo Week tournament in Ermelo. He was subsequently selected in a South African Under-16 Elite squad.

He then joined East Rand-based outfit the Falcons. During the second half of 2011, he played for the Falcons U19 side in the 2011 Under-19 Provincial Championship, the Falcons U21 side in the 2011 Under-21 Provincial Championship and for the senior side.

He also played some Varsity Cup rugby. In 2014, he represented UJ in the Varsity Cup competition, making six appearances.

=== Falcons ===
His first class debut came in their 2011 Currie Cup First Division match against the Boland Cavaliers in Kempton Park, where he contributed eight points with the boot. He made a total of five starts for the Falcons during the competition, scoring 47 points. This included an 18-point haul in their match against the SWD Eagles in Kempton Park.

Six appearances followed in the 2012 Vodacom Cup competition, with a tally of 59 points putting him in eighth place on the scoring charts. He scored 35 points in ten appearances – mostly being used as a substitute during the 2012 Currie Cup First Division.

40 points in seven appearances followed in the 2013 Vodacom Cup before he scored 90 points for the Falcons during the 2013 Currie Cup First Division to end as their top scorer and fifth overall.

He topped the scoring charts during the 2014 Currie Cup qualification series, scoring 91 points in just six appearances, which included scoring 22 points in one match against the SWD Eagles.

=== Lazio ===
Kotzé joined Italian National Championship of Excellence side Lazio for the 2015–2016 season. He scored 76 points in 14 starts in a season that saw Lazio finish in eighth place in the competition.
