= Jacques du Toit (rugby union) =

South African rugby union player (born 1993)

- Full name: Ockert Jacobus Jacques du Toit
- Born: 19 November 1993 (age 32) Bloemfontein, South Africa
- Height: 1.84 m (6 ft 1/2 in)
- Weight: 103 kg (16 st 3 lb; 227 lb)
- School: Grey College, Bloemfontein
- University: University of the Free State

Rugby union career
- Position: Hooker
- Current team: Zebre Parma
Youth career
- 2011–2014: Free State Cheetahs
Amateur team(s)
Years	Team	Apps	(Points)
2013–2015	UFS Shimlas	12	(10)
Senior career
Years	Team	Apps	(Points)
2014–2019	Free State XV	17	(10)
2015–2019	Free State Cheetahs	34	(5)
2016–2020	Cheetahs	36	(20)
2019–2020	Southern Kings	12	(0)
2020–2021	Cheetahs	2	(0)
2021–2022	Bath	32	(15)
2022–2023	Zebre Parma	11	(15)
- Correct as of 24 Mar 2023
International career
Years	Team	Apps	(Points)
2013	South Africa Under-20	5	(5)
- Correct as of 22 Apr 2018

Ockert Jacobus Jacques du Toit (born 19 November 1993) is a South African professional rugby union player for Zebre Parma in the United Rugby Championship, and previously for Bath in Premiership Rugby. His regular position is hooker. Since retiring from professional rugby, Jacques has started a career in marketing. Today, he's the founder of Leap Digital.

== Career ==
=== Youth / Varsity Cup / Vodacom Cup ===
In 2011, Du Toit was selected to represent Free State at the premier South African high school rugby union competition, the Under-18 Craven Week tournament held in Kimberley, where he started two matches for a Free State side that was crowned unofficial champions at the tournament, beating the Golden Lions 28–17 in the main match.

After high school, Du Toit joined the Free State Cheetahs Academy at the University of the Free State and was the first-choice hooker for the Free State U19 side during the 2012 Under-19 Provincial Championship, starting ten of their matches and scoring a try in their match against the SWD U19s.

In 2012, Du Toit was selected in the UFS Shimlas squad for the 2012 Varsity Cup, making a single appearance in their match against Wits.

Du Toit was then selected in the South African Under-20 squad for the 2013 IRB Junior World Championship in France, which attempted to retain the title they won in 2012. They started in fine fashion, beating the United States 97–0 in the opening match, with Du Toit starting the match and scoring one of South Africa's 16 tries just before half-time. He also started their 31–24 win over England and their 26–19 win over the hosts France in their other pool matches. Du Toit retained his starting berth for their semi-final match against Wales, where South Africa suffered a 17–18 loss to be eliminated from the competition. Their final match in the competition was a third-place play-off against New Zealand; Du Toit played off the bench in this match, helping South Africa finish in third spot in the tournament by winning the match 41–34.

Du Toit returned to domestic action for the Free State U21s, playing in all twelve of their matches during the 2013 Under-21 Provincial Championship. He also scored a try in their match against the Leopards U21s as the Free State finished in fifth spot on the log.

Du Toit started the 2014 season again playing in the Varsity Cup for UFS Shimlas; he had a greater involvement than in 2013, making seven appearances, which included five starts and two tries in their match against NMMU Madibaz in a 34–33 victory in their final match of the regular season. They finished fifth, just missing out on a semi-final berth. He was also drafted into the Free State Cheetahs squad for the 2014 Vodacom Cup. He was an unused replacement in their match against the Eastern Province Kings in Cradock, but made his domestic first class debut a few weeks later, playing off the bench in a 77–10 victory over Kenyan invitational side Simba XV. He started eleven times in the Free State U21s' 2014 Under-21 Provincial Championship season, helping them finish in fourth spot on the log to qualify for the semi-finals, where they lost to the table-topping Western Province U21s.

Du Toit made four appearances for UFS Shimlas in latter stages of the 2015 Varsity Cup. He played in their final two matches of the round-robin phase of the competition, helping Shimlas finish in second spot on the log. He started their semi-final match against the UCT Ikey Tigers, helping them to a 21–10 victory to qualify for their first ever final. He played off the bench in the final as Shimlas ran out 63–33 winners over NWU Pukke to win the competition for the first time in their history. He again moved to the Free State XV Vodacom Cup squad at the conclusion of the Varsity Cup and made four appearances for them. This included his first start in a first class match in their 29–30 defeat to eventual finalists Western Province.

=== Free State Cheetahs ===
Du Toit was named in the Free State Cheetahs' squad for the 2015 Currie Cup Premier Division and was named on the bench for their opening match of the competition against the Blue Bulls. From 2015 to 2019, Du Toit made regular appearances in both the Super Rugby and Pro14 leagues as hooker. He played in both the 2016 and 2019 Currie Cup finals, both of which the Cheetahs won. After 5 seasons at the Free State Cheetahs, he joins the Southern Kings in Port Elizabeth, South Africa as the starting hooker.

=== Southern Kings ===
Jacques du Toit joins the Southern Kings in 2019 after they experienced a rocky Pro14 2020-19 season. After just a few months, du Toit discussions emerge that he will be announced as the Southern Kings 2020-21 captain. These plans are however hindered because of the global COVID-19 pandemic and soon after, the Southern Kings go into voluntary liquidation.

=== Bath Rugby ===
Following his time in South Africa, du Toit signed with English Premiership Rugby side Bath with immediate effect in January 2021. He was initially called to join the club as injury cover for 6 months during the 2020/21 season, but his contract was soon extended to the 2021/22 Gallagher Premiership season too. After being carried off the field in May and sustaining what seemed to be a serious ankle injury, du Toit made a miraculous recovery and was on the field again the following week. He has played an astonishing 762 minutes in 20 appearances during the 2021/22 season, making him one of the most regular faces in the Premiership league to date.

=== Zebre Parma ===
For 2022−23 season, he signed for italian team Zebre Parma in the United Rugby Championship.
