= Marius van der Westhuizen =

South African rugby union player (born 1984)

- Born: 6 January 1984 (age 42) Cape Town, South Africa
- Height: 1.79 m (5 ft 10 1/2 in)
- Weight: 78 kg (12 st 4 lb; 172 lb)
- School: Hoërskool President, Goodwood, Cape Town
- University: University of South Africa

Rugby union career
Refereeing career
Years	Competition	Apps
2011–	Vodacom Cup	14
2012–	Currie Cup	18
2013–	Sevens World Series	
2013	Rugby World Cup Sevens	
2014–	Super Rugby	4
2014	World Rugby U-20 Championship	3
2014	Commonwealth Games	
- Correct as of 18 February 2015

Marius van der Westhuizen (born 6 January 1984) is a South African professional rugby union referee, currently on the Premier Panel of the South African Rugby Referees' Association.

== Early career ==
Van Der Westhuizen was born in Cape Town, South Africa. He started his refereeing career in 2007 and refereed in matches in the Western Province leagues. In 2009, he became a member of SARRA's contenders squad and took charge of matches in the Craven Week and Under-19 Provincial Championship competitions.

Van Der Westhuizen started refereeing first-class matches in 2011, debuting in the 2011 Vodacom Cup match between the Free State Cheetahs and the Falcons in Bloemfontein. He took charge of ten matches in the 2011 Under-19 and Under-21 Provincial Championships.

2012 saw him referee in several Varsity Cup and Varsity Shield matches and take charge of three matches during the 2012 Vodacom Cup. His first Currie Cup appointment was the match between the SWD Eagles and Boland Cavaliers in George, and he also took charge of the Cavaliers' match against the Griffons in Welkom, as well as several matches in the 2012 Under-21 Provincial Championship and the match between Wales Under-18 and England Under-18.

== International ==
Van Der Westhuizen became a referee on the IRB Sevens World Series circuit, where he very quickly established himself as one of the top referees, being the man in charge of the 2013 Hong Kong Sevens final in just his third tournament. He was also named on the refereeing panel for Moscow's 2013 Rugby World Cup Sevens.

Further appointments in Varsity Rugby followed in 2013 (which included refereeing the 2013 Varsity Cup final between Maties and UP Tuks), and there were four more Vodacom Cup appearances. He officiated three matches in the 2013 Currie Cup First Division before his first Premier Division appointment for the match between the Golden Lions and Free State Cheetahs in Johannesburg, his first of five matches in the competition.

Van Der Westhuizen was named on SANZAR's referee list for the 2014 Super Rugby season and was in charge of his first Super Rugby match when the Lions met the Crusaders in Johannesburg.

Van Der Westhuizen also officiated at the 2014 Commonwealth Games in Glasgow. and at the 2014 IRB Junior World Championship, taking charge of three matches, including the 5th-place play-off semi-final between Australia and Samoa,

Van der Westhuizen refereed at the 2015 Tbilisi Cup to become the 69th test referee for South Africa.
