= Dylan Peterson (rugby union) =

South African rugby union player

- Born: 10 February 1990 (age 36) Alberton, South Africa
- Height: 1.91 m (6 ft 3 in)
- Weight: 104 kg (16 st 5 lb; 229 lb)
- School: King Edward VII School, Johannesburg
- University: University of Johannesburg

Rugby union career
- Position: Number eight / Flanker / Lock
Youth career
- 2009–2011: Golden Lions
Amateur team(s)
| Years | Team | Apps | (Points) |
| 2012–2015 | UJ | 15 | (10) |
Senior career
| Years | Team | Apps | (Points) |
| 2011 | Golden Lions XV | 1 | (0) |
| 2013 | Golden Lions XV | 3 | (0) |
| 2015–2016 | Pumas | 5 | (0) |
| 2017 | Falcons | 1 | (0) |
| 2017 | SWD Eagles | 7 | (0) |
- Correct as of 29 May 2018

Dylan Peterson (born 10 February 1990) is a South African professional rugby union player who most recently played for the SWD Eagles. He is a utility forward that can play as a flanker, number eight or lock.

== Career ==
=== Golden Lions / UJ ===
Peterson attended King Edward VII School in Johannesburg, but did not earn any provincial selection at high school level. However, after high school, he joined the Golden Lions Academy and he represented the Golden Lions U19s in the 2009 Under-19 Provincial Championship.

Peterson made his first class debut in 2011, coming on as a replacement in the Golden Lions' 25–28 defeat to the Falcons in a 2011 Currie Cup compulsory friendly match. He also made twelve appearances for the Golden Lions U21s in the 2011 Under-21 Provincial Championship, scoring four tries including a brace against Falcons U21, to help the Lions reach the semi-finals, but did not play in their semi-final match as they lost 18–47 to the Blue Bulls U21s.

In 2012, Peterson made a single appearances for UJ in the Varsity Cup. He returned to first class rugby in 2013, when he started in three matches – against the Falcons, Blue Bulls and Griffons – in the 2013 Vodacom Cup competition. The Golden Lions eventually went on to win the competition, beating the Pumas 42–28 in the final.

Peterson returned to Varsity Cup action in 2014 and played in all seven of their matches in the competition. However, after winning just one of their matches, UJ finished second-bottom on the log and had to play in a relegation play-off match against UKZN Impi to retain their Varsity Cup status. Peterson scored a try in a 42–8 victory to ensured UJ remained in the Varsity Cup for 2015. He was once again involved in their 2015 season and made six starts as they improved slightly to finish in sixth position on the log.

=== Pumas ===
Peterson joined Nelspruit-based side Pumas during the 2015 Currie Cup Premier Division season. He was included on the bench for their final match of the season against the Blue Bulls and he came on as a replacement in the second half of their 24–25 defeat to make his debut in the Currie Cup proper.
