= Shaun McDonald (rugby union) =

South African rugby union player

- Born: 9 February 1989 (age 37) Goodwood, Cape Town, South Africa
- Height: 1.92 m (6 ft 3 1/2 in)
- Weight: 117 kg (258 lb; 18 st 6 lb)
- School: Tygerberg High School
- University: Northlink College

Rugby union career
- Position: Lock / Flanker
Youth career
- 2006–2007: Western Province
- 2009–2010: Golden Lions
Amateur team(s)
Years	Team	Apps	(Points)
2011–2012	Maties	0	(0)
2012	Villagers		
2013–2014	UCT Ikey Tigers	11	(20)
Senior career
Years	Team	Apps	(Points)
2014–2015	Eastern Province Kings	5	(0)
2016	Boland Cavaliers	22	(10)
2017–2018	Griquas	15	(10)
2018	Griffons	4	(5)
- Correct as of 27 October 2018

Shaun McDonald (born 9 February 1989 in Goodwood, South Africa) is a South African rugby union player who last played for the Griffons in the Currie Cup and in the Rugby Challenge. His regular position is lock or flanker.

== Career ==
=== Youth, Varsity Cup and amateur rugby ===
While playing rugby for Tygerberg High School, McDonald was selected in Western Province's Under-18 Craven Week squad for the 2006 edition in Johannesburg and earned a selection for the same side for the 2007 competition in Stellenbosch.

In 2009, he joined the Johannesburg-based Golden Lions team. He made six appearances for them during the 2010 Under-21 Provincial Championship, playing six matches.

However, he failed to break into the senior side and he returned to Cape Town. He played club rugby for the Maties second team, Victorians He was named in the Maties squad for the 2012 Varsity Cup, but didn't make any appearances for them. Instead, after playing for rugby for Villagers, he joined the Western Cape's other Varsity Cup side, the UCT Ikey Tigers for the 2013 Varsity Cup. He made just two appearances, but returned for the 2014 Varsity Cup, where he played in nine matches for Ikeys during the competition, scoring five tries as he helped the side reach the final. McDonald featured in the final against NWU Pukke in Potchefstroom, where UCT fought back from 33 to 15 down with five minutes to go to score a sensational 39–33 victory. He was also named the "Forward That Rocks" for the competition.

=== Eastern Province Kings ===
Following his Varsity Cup performances, he was recruited by Port Elizabeth-based side the Eastern Province Kings for the 2014 Currie Cup Premier Division campaign.

He made his first class (and Currie Cup debut) for the Kings in their 60–19 loss to the Golden Lions in Johannesburg. After a further appearance off the bench in the return match against the Golden Lions, McDonald started his first Currie Cup match against Western Province. He started two more matches, but could not help his side achieve a victory in any of these matches, eventually finishing bottom of the log. He signed a two-year contract extension to remain in Port Elizabeth until the end of 2016.

=== Boland Cavaliers ===
He joined Wellington-based side Boland Cavaliers for the 2016 Currie Cup qualification series.

=== Griquas ===
He moved to Kimberley during 2016 to join Griquas.
