= Louis Fourie (rugby union) =

South African rugby union player

- Full name: Louis Johannes Fourie
- Born: 28 January 1991 (age 35) Bloemfontein, South Africa
- Height: 1.96 m (6 ft 5 in)
- Weight: 114 kg (251 lb; 17 st 13 lb)
- School: Pearson High School, Port Elizabeth
- University: Nelson Mandela Metropolitan University

Rugby union career
- Position: Lock
Youth career
- 2009–2012: Eastern Province Kings
Amateur team(s)
| Years | Team | Apps | (Points) |
| 2011–2014 | NMMU Madibaz | 24 | (10) |
Senior career
| Years | Team | Apps | (Points) |
| 2014 | Eastern Province Kings | 2 | (0) |
- Correct as of 20 February 2015

Louis Johannes Fourie (born 28 January 1991) is a South African professional rugby union player that played provincial rugby for the Eastern Province Kings and Varsity Rugby for NMMU Madibaz. His regular position is lock.

== Career ==
=== Youth / Varsity Cup ===
In 2009, Fourie was included in Eastern Province's Under-18 Craven Week squad for the tournament held in East London. After finishing school, he enrolled at Port Elizabeth university Nelson Mandela Metropolitan University. He played Varsity Cup rugby for their first team, the NMMU Madibaz for four seasons between 2011 and 2014, making 24 appearances and scoring two tries.

Fourie also became involved with the academy sides of the Eastern Province Kings. In 2011, he started all eight of the Eastern Province U21 side's matches in the 2011 Under-21 Provincial Championship, scoring tries in their matches against SWD U21 and Griffons U21 as they topped the Group B log. They won their semi-final against Pumas U21, but fell short in the final, losing 19–23 to Border U21.

Fourie made seven appearances for the side in the 2011 Under-21 Provincial Championship, once again topping the log. Fourie scored a try in their 67–5 semi-final victory over Griquas U21 and also started the final against SWD U21, this time helping them to a 24–10 victory to clinch the Group B championship.

=== Eastern Province Kings ===
After four seasons in Varsity Rugby, Fourie was included in the Eastern Province Kings squad for the 2014 Vodacom Cup competition. He made his first class debut by starting their match against the SWD Eagles in George, a game they lost 21–23, and also started the following week in a 28–21 victory over Boland Cavaliers. That was his only involvement for the Eastern Province Kings, however, as he was not named in their squad for the 2014 Currie Cup Premier Division.
