= 2014 Varsity Rugby =

The 2014 Varsity Rugby competitions were contested from 27 January to 7 April 2014. Varsity Rugby is the collective name of four rugby union competitions played between several university teams in South Africa, with the Varsity Cup being the premier competition. The 2014 season was the seventh edition of this tournament.

== Rules ==
All four 2014 Varsity Rugby competitions used a different scoring system to the regular system. Tries were worth five points as usual, but conversions were worth three points, while penalties and drop goals were only worth two points.

All Varsity Cup games also had two referees officiating each game, props' jerseys featured a special gripping patch to ensure better binding, intended to reduce collapsing scrums and the mark was extended to the entire field.

== Varsity Cup ==
The following teams competed in the 2014 Varsity Cup: Maties, NMMU Madibaz, NWU Pukke, UCT Ikey Tigers, UFS Shimlas, UJ, UP Tuks and Wits. The tournament was won by UCT Ikey Tigers, who beat NWU Pukke 39–33 in the final, while Wits were relegated to the 2015 Varsity Shield.

== Varsity Shield ==
The following teams competed in the 2014 Varsity Shield: CUT Ixias, TUT Vikings, UFH Blues, UKZN Impi and UWC. The tournament was won by CUT Ixias, who beat UKZN Impi 35–26 in the final and was subsequently promoted to the 2015 Varsity Cup.

== Promotion/relegation play-offs ==
=== 2015 Varsity Cup play-off ===
7 April 2014	UJ	42–8	UKZN Impi	Fanie du Toit Sport Ground, Potchefstroom
14:30	Try: Andries Oosthuizen 9', 63'; PJ Walters 22'; Jaun Kotzé 53'; Dylan Peterson 72'; Wiseman Kamanga 77'; Con: Marais Schmidt 23', 54', 64', 73' (4/6); Drop: Jaun Kotzé (0/1); Cards: Devon Marthinus (yellow card) 19'	Scoreboard	Try: Lwazi Ngcungama 4'; Con: Duncan Campbell 5' (1/1); Cards: Gavin Nyawata (yellow card) 62' to 72'

- UJ remain in the Varsity Cup for 2015.
- UKZN Impi remain in the Varsity Shield for 2015.

=== 2015 Varsity Shield play-off ===
19 July 2014	TUT Vikings	39–26	NWU Vaal Triangle	TUT Stadium, Pretoria
15:00	Try: Andries Truter 26'; Ricardo Burger 36'; Claude Johannes 38'; Hamish Herd 43'; Edwin Oliver 52'; Nico Smuts 58'; Con: Litha Vumisa 26', 37' (2/5); Leroy Afrika (0/1); Pen: Leroy Afrika 75' (1/1); Cards: Werner Serfontein (yellow card) 54' to 64'; Ricardo Burger (yellow card) 77'	Scoreboard	Try: David Oosthuizen 6', 12', 76'; Waylon Thompson 39'; Con: Vian Steynen 7', 53' (2/2); Dominic Cloete (0/2); Cards: Andries Pretorius (yellow card) 55'

- TUT Vikings remain in the Varsity Shield for 2015.

== Young Guns ==
=== Competition Rules ===
There were eight participating universities in the 2014 Young Guns competition. These teams were divided into two pools (the FNB pool and the Steinhoff pool) and played the other teams in the pool once over the course of the season, either home or away.

Teams received four points for a win and two points for a draw. Bonus points were awarded to teams that scored four or more tries in a game, as well as to teams that lost a match by seven points or less. Teams were ranked by log points, then points difference (points scored less points conceded).

The top two teams in each pool qualified for the title play-offs. In the semi-finals, the teams that finished first had home advantage against the teams that finished second in their respective pools. The winners of these semi-finals played each other in the final.

=== Teams ===
2014 Young Guns teams
Team	University	Stadium
Maties Juniors	Stellenbosch University	Danie Craven Stadium, Stellenbosch
NMMU Young Guns	Nelson Mandela Metropolitan University	NMMU Stadium, Port Elizabeth
NWU Pukke Young Guns	North-West University	Fanie du Toit Sport Ground, Potchefstroom
UCT Trojans	University of Cape Town	UCT Rugby Fields, Cape Town
UFS Shimlas Young Guns	University of the Free State	Shimla Park, Bloemfontein
UJ Young Guns	University of Johannesburg	UJ Stadium, Johannesburg
UP Tuks Young Guns	University of Pretoria	LC de Villiers Stadium, Pretoria
Wits Young Guns	University of the Witwatersrand	Wits Rugby Stadium, Johannesburg

=== Standings ===
The final league standings for the 2014 Varsity Cup Young Guns were:

2014 Young Guns Steinhoff Pool Log
Pos	Team	Pl	W	D	L	PF	PA	PD	TF	TA	TB	LB	Pts
1	UJ Young Guns	3	3	0	0	108	69	+39	?	?	3	0	15
2	Maties Juniors	3	2	0	1	92	44	+48	?	?	2	1	11
3	UCT Trojans	3	0	1	2	42	95	−53	?	?	1	0	3
4	NMMU Young Guns	3	0	1	2	45	79	−34	?	?	0	0	2
2014 Young Guns FNB Pool log
Pos	Team	Pl	W	D	L	PF	PA	PD	TF	TA	TB	LB	Pts
1	UP Tuks Young Guns	3	3	0	0	177	36	+141	?	?	2	0	14
2	UFS Shimlas Young Guns	3	1	1	1	172	54	+118	?	?	2	1	9
3	NWU Pukke Young Guns	3	1	1	1	139	38	+101	?	?	1	1	8
4	Wits Young Guns	3	0	0	3	2	362	−360	?	?	0	0	0
UJ Young Guns, Maties Juniors, UP Tuks Young Guns and UFS Shimlas Young Guns qualified for the semi-finals. Points breakdown: *4 points for a win *2 points for a draw *1 bonus point for a loss by seven points or less *1 bonus point for scoring four or more tries in a match

=== Fixtures and results ===
The 2014 Varsity Young Guns fixtures were as follows:

- All times are South African (GMT+2).

==== Round one ====
10 February 2014	UJ Young Guns	40–16	NMMU Young Guns	UJ Stadium, Johannesburg
16:45		Report

10 February 2014	Wits Young Guns	2–137	UP Tuks Young Guns	Wits Rugby Stadium, Johannesburg
16:45		Report

10 February 2014	Maties Juniors	42–0	UCT Trojans	UJ Stadium, Johannesburg
19:00		Report

Bye/s: NWU Pukke Young Guns, UFS Shimlas Young Guns

==== Round two ====
17 February 2014	NMMU Young Guns	13–13	UCT Trojans	NMMU Stadium, Port Elizabeth
14:30		Report

17 February 2014	UP Tuks Young Guns	28–24	UFS Shimlas Young Guns	LC de Villiers Stadium, Pretoria
16:45		Report

Bye/s: Maties Juniors, NWU Pukke Young Guns, UJ Young Guns, Wits Young Guns

==== Round three ====
24 February 2014	UCT Trojans	29–40	UJ Young Guns	UCT Rugby Fields, Cape Town
14:30		Report

24 February 2014	UFS Shimlas Young Guns	122–0	Wits Young Guns	Shimla Park, Bloemfontein
14:30		Report

Bye/s: Maties Juniors, NMMU Young Guns, NWU Pukke Young Guns, UP Tuks Young Guns

==== Round four ====
3 March 2014	Maties Juniors	26–16	NMMU Young Guns	Danie Craven Stadium, Stellenbosch
16:45		Report

3 March 2014	Wits Young Guns	0–103	NWU Pukke Young Guns	Wits Rugby Stadium, Johannesburg
19:00		Report

Bye/s: UCT Trojans, UFS Shimlas Young Guns, UJ Young Guns, UP Tuks Young Guns

==== Round five ====
10 March 2014	UP Tuks Young Guns	12–10	NWU Pukke Young Guns	LC de Villiers Stadium, Pretoria
14:30		Report

10 March 2014	UJ Young Guns	28–24	Maties Juniors	UJ Stadium, Johannesburg
16:45		Report

Bye/s: NMMU Young Guns, UCT Trojans, UFS Shimlas Young Guns, Wits Young Guns

==== Round six ====
17 March 2014	NWU Pukke Young Guns	26–26	UFS Shimlas Young Guns	Fanie du Toit Sport Ground, Potchefstroom
16:45		Report

Bye/s: Maties Juniors, NMMU Young Guns, UCT Trojans, UJ Young Guns, UP Tuks Young Guns, Wits Young Guns

==== Semi-finals ====
24 March 2014	UP Tuks Young Guns	40–24	Maties Juniors	LC de Villiers Stadium, Pretoria
14:30		Report

24 March 2014	UJ Young Guns	26–33	UFS Shimlas Young Guns	UJ Stadium, Johannesburg
17:00		Report

==== Final ====
31 March 2014	UP Tuks Young Guns	17–17 (aet)	UFS Shimlas Young Guns	LC de Villiers Stadium, Pretoria
19:00		Report

- The UFS Shimlas Young Guns beat UP Tuks Young Guns in a kick-off after the match ended in a 17–all draw after extra time.

=== Honours ===
2014 Young Guns Champions:	UFS Shimlas Young Guns

== Koshuis Rugby Championship ==
=== Competition Rules ===
There were eight participating teams in the 2014 Koshuis Rugby Championship competition, the winners of the internal leagues of each of the eight Varsity Cup teams. These teams were divided into two pools and each team played every team in their pool once over the course of the season, either home or away.

Teams received four points for a win and two points for a draw. Bonus points were awarded to teams that scored four or more tries in a game, as well as to teams that lost a match by seven points or less. Teams were ranked by log points, then points difference (points scored less points conceded).

The top two teams in each pool qualified for the semi-finals.

=== Teams ===
2014 Koshuis Rugby Championship teams
Team	University	Stadium
Cobras, UCT Ikey Tigers	University of Cape Town	UCT Rugby Fields, Cape Town
Heimat, UFS Shimlas	University of the Free State	Shimla Park, Bloemfontein
Humanities, Wits	University of the Witwatersrand	Wits Rugby Stadium, Johannesburg
Majuba, UJ	University of Johannesburg	UJ Stadium, Johannesburg
Medies, Maties	Stellenbosch University	Danie Craven Stadium, Stellenbosch
Onderstepoort, UP Tuks	University of Pretoria	LC de Villiers Stadium, Pretoria
Oppidani, NMMU Madibaz	Nelson Mandela Metropolitan University	NMMU Stadium, Port Elizabeth
Patria, NWU Pukke	North-West University	Fanie du Toit Sport Ground, Potchefstroom

=== Standings ===
The league standings for the 2014 Koshuis Rugby Championship were:

2014 Koshuis Rugby Championship log
Pos	Team	Pl	W	D	L	PF	PA	PD	TF	TA	TB	LB	Pts
* Legend: Pos = Position, Pl = Played, W = Won, D = Drawn, L = Lost, PF = Points for, PA = Points against, PD = Points difference, TF = Tries for, TA = Tries against, TB = Try bonus points, LB = Losing bonus points, Pts = Log points Mopanie and Vishuis qualified to the final. Points breakdown: *4 points for a win *2 points for a draw *1 bonus point for a loss by seven points or less *1 bonus point for scoring four or more tries in a match

=== Fixtures and results ===
The 2014 Koshuis Rugby Championship fixtures were as follows:

- All times are South African (GMT+2).

==== Round one ====
17 February 2014	Oppidani	15–65	Medies	NMMU Stadium, Port Elizabeth
16:45		Report

17 February 2014	Majuba	31–8	Humanities	UJ Stadium, Johannesburg
19:00		Report

Bye/s: Cobras, Heimat, Onderstepoort, Patria

==== Round two ====
24 February 2014	Heimat	55–16	Humanities	Shimla Park, Bloemfontein
16:45		Report

24 February 2014	Oppidani	0–39	Patria	NMMU Stadium, Port Elizabeth
16:45		Report

Bye/s: Cobras, Majuba, Medies, Onderstepoort

==== Round three ====
3 March 2014	Majuba	13–28	Cobras	UJ Stadium, Johannesburg
16:45		Report

3 March 2014	Onderstepoort	11–13	Patria	LC de Villiers Stadium, Pretoria
16:45		Report

Bye/s: Heimat, Humanities, Medies, Oppidani

==== Round four ====
10 March 2014	Onderstepoort	–	Oppidani	LC de Villiers Stadium, Pretoria
14:30		Report

10 March 2014	Cobras	0–37	Heimat	UCT Rugby Fields, Cape Town
14:45		Report

10 March 2014	Patria	24–22	Medies	Fanie du Toit Sport Ground, Potchefstroom
19:00		Report

Bye/s: Humanities, Majuba

==== Round five ====
17 March 2014	Medies	23–12	Onderstepoort	Danie Craven Stadium, Stellenbosch
		Report

17 March 2014	Humanities	13–34	Cobras	Wits Rugby Stadium, Johannesburg
		Report

17 March 2014	Heimat	47–16	Majuba	Shimla Park, Bloemfontein
		Report

Bye/s: Oppidani, Patria

==== Semi-finals ====
24 March 2014	Patria	52–16	Cobras	Fanie du Toit Sport Ground, Potchefstroom
16:30		Report

24 March 2014	Heimat	31–16	Medies	Shimla Park, Bloemfontein
17:00		Report

==== Final ====
7 April 2014	Patria	12–20	Heimat	Fanie du Toit Sport Ground, Potchefstroom
16:45		Report

=== Honours ===
2014 Koshuis Rugby Championship Champions:	Heimat

== See also ==
- Varsity Cup
- 2014 Currie Cup Premier Division
- 2014 Currie Cup First Division
- 2014 Vodacom Cup
