= Jaco van Heerden =

South African rugby union referee (born 1983)

- Born: Daniel Jaco van Heerden; 26 January 1983 (age 43)
- Height: 1.88 m (6 ft 2 in)
- Weight: 89 kg (14 st 0 lb; 196 lb)
- School: Hoërskool Waterkloof, Pretoria
- University: University of Pretoria

Rugby union career
Refereeing career
Years	Competition	Apps
2013–2015	Vodacom Cup	10
2013–2017	Currie Cup	34
2015–2017	Super Rugby	20
2016–2017	International	3
- Correct as of 26 November 2017

Daniel Jaco van Heerden (born 26 January 1983) is a former South African rugby union referee that served on the Premier Panel of the South African Rugby Referees' Association between 2014 and 2017.

He retired from refereeing at the end of the 2017 season to concentrate on his career as a Supreme Court advocate.

== Career ==
He started refereeing first class matches in 2013, making his debut in the 2013 Vodacom Cup match between the Griffons and the Griquas in Welkom, the first of five matches during the competition. His first Currie Cup appointment was the match between the Pumas and Griffons in Nelspruit during the 2013 Currie Cup First Division.

During the 2014 Currie Cup Premier Division, he took charge of his first Premier Division clash, officiating the trans-Jukskei clash between the Golden Lions and the Blue Bulls in Johannesburg. He also officiated two matches in France in October 2014, a Rugby Pro D2 match between Béziers and Biarritz, as well as a Top 14 match between Stade Français and Racing Métro.

He was named on SANZAR's referee list for the 2015 Super Rugby season and was in charge of his first Super Rugby match when the Bulls met the Sharks in Pretoria.
