= 2011 Under-21 Provincial Championship =

South African rugby union tournament

- Champions: Blue Bulls
- Runners-up: Sharks

The 2011 ABSA Under-21 Provincial Championship was contested from 15 July to 29 October 2011. The tournament featured the Under-21 players from the fourteen provincial rugby unions in South Africa.

== Competition ==
=== Division A ===
There were seven participating teams in the 2011 ABSA Under-21 Provincial Championship Division A. These teams played each other twice over the course of the season, once at home and once away.

Teams received four points for a win and two points for a draw. Bonus points were awarded to teams that scored 4 or more tries in a game, as well as to teams that lost a match by 7 points or less. Teams were ranked by points, then points difference (points scored less points conceded).

The top 4 teams qualified for the title play-offs. In the semi-finals, the team that finished first had home advantage against the team that finished fourth, while the team that finished second had home advantage against the team that finished third. The winners of these semi-finals played each other in the final, at the same venue as the 2011 Currie Cup Premier Division Final.

The bottom team in Division A played a play-off game at home against the winner of the Division B final for a place in Division A in 2012.

=== Division B ===
There were seven participating teams in the 2011 ABSA Under-21 Provincial Championship Division B. These teams played each other once over the course of the season, either at home or away.

Teams received four points for a win and two points for a draw. Bonus points were awarded to teams that scored 4 or more tries in a game, as well as to teams that lost a match by 7 points or less. Teams were ranked by points, then points difference (points scored less points conceded).

The top 4 teams qualified for the title play-offs. In the semi-finals, the team that finished first had home advantage against the team that finished fourth, while the team that finished second had home advantage against the team that finished third. The winners of these semi-finals played each other in the final, at the same venue as the 2011 Currie Cup First Division Final.

The winner of the final played a play-off game away from home against the bottom team in Division A for a place in Division A in 2012.

== Teams ==
Location of teams in 2011 ABSA Under-21 Provincial Championship
Division A
Division B

=== Team listing ===
The following teams will take part in the 2011 ABSA Under-21 Provincial Championship competition:

Division A
Team	Stadium/s
Blue Bulls	Loftus Versfeld, Pretoria
Falcons	Barnard Stadium, Kempton Park
Falcons	Bosman Stadium, Brakpan
Free State Cheetahs	Free State Stadium, Bloemfontein
Golden Lions	Coca-Cola Park, Johannesburg
Leopards	Profert Olën Park, Potchefstroom
Leopards	Royal Bafokeng Stadium, Phokeng
Sharks	Mr Price Kings Park, Durban
Western Province	Newlands Stadium, Cape Town

Division B
Team	Stadium/s
Boland Cavaliers	Boland Stadium, Wellington
Border Bulldogs	Buffalo City Stadium, East London
Eastern Province Kings	Nelson Mandela Bay Stadium, Port Elizabeth
Griquas	Griqua Park, Kimberley
Griffons	North West Stadium, Welkom
Pumas	Mbombela Stadium, Mbombela
Pumas	Puma Stadium, Witbank
SWD Eagles	Outeniqua Park, George

== Division A ==
=== Table ===
2011 Under-21 Provincial Championship Division A Table
	Team	Played	Won	Drawn	Lost	Points For	Points Against	Points Difference	Tries For	Tries Against	Try Bonus	Losing Bonus	Points
1	Blue Bulls	12	10	0	2	544	252	+292	61	30	7	1	48
2	Western Province	12	9	0	3	493	238	+255	69	24	8	3	47
3	Sharks	12	8	1	3	482	265	+217	63	28	6	1	41
4	Golden Lions	12	7	1	4	477	311	+166	63	36	6	2	38
5	Free State Cheetahs	12	3	0	9	394	388	+6	50	41	6	3	21
6	Leopards	12	4	0	8	327	548	-221	42	78	3	1	20
7	Falcons	12	0	0	12	153	868	-715	20	131	1	0	1
The top 4 teams qualified for the semi-finals. The bottom team will play in a relegation play-off game. Points breakdown: *4 points for a win *2 points for a draw *1 bonus point for a loss by seven points or less *1 bonus point for scoring four or more tries in a match

=== Fixtures and results ===
- Fixtures are subject to change.
- All times are South African (GMT+2).

==== Regular season ====
===== Round one =====
2011-07-15	Golden Lions	70–3	Falcons	Coca-Cola Park, Johannesburg
16:40		Scoreboard

2011-07-16	Free State Cheetahs	31–33	Leopards	Free State Stadium, Bloemfontein
12:50		Scoreboard

2011-07-16	Sharks	18–25	Blue Bulls	Mr Price Kings Park, Durban
14:40		Scoreboard

===== Round two =====
2011-07-22	Leopards	17–67	Western Province	Profert Olën Park, Potchefstroom
17:00		Scoreboard

2011-07-23	Blue Bulls	47–7	Free State Cheetahs	Loftus Versfeld, Pretoria
14:40		Scoreboard

2011-07-23	Falcons	23–68	Sharks	Bosman Stadium, Brakpan
15:00		Scoreboard

===== Round three =====
2011-07-30	Western Province	28–22	Blue Bulls	Newlands Stadium, Cape Town
		Scoreboard

2011-07-30	Sharks	43–6	Free State Cheetahs	Mr Price Kings Park, Durban
13:00		Scoreboard

2011-07-30	Golden Lions	97–0	Leopards	Coca-Cola Park, Johannesburg
14:30		Scoreboard

===== Round four =====
2011-08-05	Leopards	45–14	Falcons	Profert Olën Park, Potchefstroom
17:00		Scoreboard

2011-08-06	Free State Cheetahs	18–29	Western Province	Free State Stadium, Bloemfontein
12:40		Scoreboard

2011-08-06	Blue Bulls	75–22	Golden Lions	Loftus Versfeld, Pretoria
14:30		Scoreboard

===== Round five =====
2011-08-12	Western Province	32–16	Sharks	Newlands Stadium, Cape Town
16:40		Scoreboard

2011-08-13	Falcons	12–48	Blue Bulls	Barnard Stadium, Kempton Park
17:00		Scoreboard

2011-08-13	Golden Lions	41–32	Free State Cheetahs	Coca-Cola Park, Johannesburg
16:30		Scoreboard

===== Round six =====
2011-08-19	Western Province	18–17	Golden Lions	Newlands Stadium, Cape Town
16:30		Scoreboard

2011-08-19	Sharks	71–17	Leopards	Mr Price Kings Park, Durban
17:00		Scoreboard

2011-08-20	Free State Cheetahs	70–21	Falcons	Free State Stadium, Bloemfontein
12:50		Scoreboard

===== Round seven =====
2011-08-26	Leopards	14–41	Blue Bulls	Royal Bafokeng Stadium, Phokeng
16:40		Scoreboard

2011-08-27	Golden Lions	18–24	Sharks	Coca-Cola Park, Johannesburg
14:30		Scoreboard

2011-08-27	Falcons	3–81	Western Province	Barnard Stadium, Kempton Park
15:00		Scoreboard

===== Round eight =====
2011-09-02	Falcons	20–45	Golden Lions	Barnard Stadium, Kempton Park
17:00		Scoreboard

2011-09-03	Leopards	38–37	Free State Cheetahs	Profert Olën Park, Potchefstroom
14:00		Scoreboard

2011-09-03	Blue Bulls	37–28	Sharks	Loftus Versfeld, Pretoria
14:40		Scoreboard

===== Round nine =====
2011-09-10	Sharks	88–10	Falcons	Mr Price Kings Park, Durban
13:00		Scoreboard

2011-09-10	Western Province	39–13	Leopards	Newlands Stadium, Cape Town
13:45		Scoreboard

2011-09-10	Free State Cheetahs	26–16	Blue Bulls	Free State Stadium, Bloemfontein
14:45		Scoreboard

===== Round ten =====
2011-09-16	Leopards	20–44	Golden Lions	Profert Olën Park, Potchefstroom
17:05		Scoreboard

2011-09-17	Free State Cheetahs	21–43	Sharks	Free State Stadium, Bloemfontein
12:50		Scoreboard

2011-09-17	Blue Bulls	38–37	Western Province	Loftus Versfeld, Pretoria
14:30		Scoreboard

===== Round eleven =====
2011-09-24	Golden Lions	21–33	Blue Bulls	Coca-Cola Park, Johannesburg
12:30		Scoreboard

2011-09-24	Falcons	26–72	Leopards	Barnard Stadium, Kempton Park
13:00		Scoreboard

2011-09-24	Western Province	34–29	Free State Cheetahs	Newlands Stadium, Cape Town
14:40		Scoreboard

===== Round twelve =====
2011-09-30	Blue Bulls	113–14	Falcons	Loftus Versfeld, Pretoria
16:40		Scoreboard

2011-10-01	Free State Cheetahs	22–36	Golden Lions	Free State Stadium, Bloemfontein
12:50		Scoreboard

2011-10-01	Sharks	23–17	Western Province	Mr Price Kings Park, Durban
14:40		Scoreboard

===== Round thirteen =====
2011-10-07	Falcons	7–95	Free State Cheetahs	Barnard Stadium, Kempton Park
15:00		Scoreboard

2011-10-08	Golden Lions	42–38	Western Province	Coca-Cola Park, Johannesburg
14:30		Scoreboard

2011-10-08	Leopards	33–34	Sharks	Royal Bafokeng Stadium, Phokeng
17:45		Scoreboard

===== Round fourteen =====
2011-10-14	Blue Bulls	49–25	Leopards	Loftus Versfeld, Pretoria
16:45		Scoreboard

2011-10-15	Western Province	73–0	Falcons	Newlands Stadium, Cape Town
14:40		Scoreboard

2011-10-15	Sharks	26–26	Golden Lions	Mr Price Kings Park, Durban
17:00		Scoreboard

==== Play-off games ====
===== Semi-finals =====
2011-10-21	Blue Bulls	47–18	Golden Lions	Loftus Versfeld, Pretoria
17:00		Scoreboard

2011-10-21	Western Province	12–19	Sharks	Florida Park, Parow
18:00		Scoreboard

===== Final =====
2011-10-29	Blue Bulls	43–30	Sharks	Coca-Cola Park, Johannesburg
14:30		Scoreboard

== Division B ==
=== Table ===
2011 Under-21 Provincial Championship Division B Table
	Team	Played	Won	Drawn	Lost	Points For	Points Against	Points Difference	Tries For	Tries Against	Try Bonus	Losing Bonus	Points
1	Eastern Province Kings	6	6	0	0	241	143	+98	28	17	4	0	28
2	Border Bulldogs	6	5	0	1	188	109	+79	21	14	3	0	23
3	Griquas	6	4	0	2	161	160	+1	19	19	3	1	20
4	Pumas	6	2	0	4	188	173	+15	26	17	4	3	15
5	Boland Cavaliers	6	2	0	4	136	199	-63	19	24	2	1	11
6	Griffons	6	1	0	5	163	215	-52	22	28	3	3	10
7	SWD Eagles	6	1	0	5	112	190	-78	12	28	1	1	6
The top 4 teams qualify for the semi-finals. The title play-off winner play in a promotion play-off game. Points breakdown: *4 points for a win *2 points for a draw *1 bonus point for a loss by seven points or less *1 bonus point for scoring four or more tries in a match

=== Fixtures and results ===
- Fixtures are subject to change.
- All times are South African (GMT+2).

==== Regular season ====
===== Round one =====
2011-08-06	Griquas	35–33	Pumas	Griqua Park, Kimberley
16:40		Scoreboard

===== Round two =====
2011-08-12	Pumas	36–34	Griffons	Puma Stadium, Witbank
15:00		Scoreboard

===== Round three =====
2011-08-20	Pumas	27–30	Border Bulldogs	Puma Stadium, Witbank
15:00		Scoreboard

===== Round four =====
2011-08-26	Border Bulldogs	36–12	Boland Cavaliers	Buffalo City Stadium, East London
14:30		Scoreboard

2011-08-26	SWD Eagles	7–36	Eastern Province Kings	Outeniqua Park, George
15:30		Scoreboard

2011-08-27	Griffons	24–31	Griquas	North West Stadium, Welkom
14:45		Scoreboard

===== Round five =====
2011-09-02	Eastern Province Kings	29–21	Border Bulldogs	Nelson Mandela Bay Stadium, Port Elizabeth
16:15		Scoreboard

2011-09-02	Pumas	45–10	SWD Eagles	Mbombela Stadium, Mbombela
16:40		Scoreboard

2011-09-03	Boland Cavaliers	23–21	Griffons	Boland Stadium, Wellington
14:00		Scoreboard

===== Round six =====
2011-09-09	Border Bulldogs	41–10	SWD Eagles	Buffalo City Stadium, East London
14:40		Scoreboard

2011-09-10	Griquas	35–27	Boland Cavaliers	Griqua Park, Kimberley
12:30		Scoreboard

2011-09-10	Griffons	40–66	Eastern Province Kings	North West Stadium, Welkom
13:00		Scoreboard

===== Round seven =====
2011-09-16	Eastern Province Kings	39–20	Griquas	Nelson Mandela Bay Stadium, Port Elizabeth
16:15		Scoreboard

2011-09-16	SWD Eagles	16–27	Griffons	Outeniqua Park, George
17:00		Scoreboard

2011-09-17	Boland Cavaliers	28–23	Pumas	Boland Stadium, Wellington
10:50		Scoreboard

===== Round eight =====
2011-09-23	Boland Cavaliers	31–35	Eastern Province Kings	Boland Stadium, Wellington
12:30		Scoreboard

2011-09-24	Griquas	26–20	SWD Eagles	Griqua Park, Kimberley
12:30		Scoreboard

2011-09-24	Griffons	17–43	Border Bulldogs	North West Stadium, Welkom
13:00		Scoreboard

===== Round nine =====
2011-09-30	SWD Eagles	49–15	Boland Cavaliers	Outeniqua Park, George
15:00		Scoreboard

2011-09-30	Border Bulldogs	17–14	Griquas	Buffalo City Stadium, East London
17:00		Scoreboard

2011-10-01	Eastern Province Kings	36–24	Pumas	Zwide Stadium, Ibhayi
15:00		Scoreboard

==== Play-Off Games ====
===== Semi-finals =====
2011-10-07	Eastern Province Kings	23–13	Pumas	Nelson Mandela Bay Stadium, Port Elizabeth
15:30		Scoreboard

2011-10-07	Border Bulldogs	24–14	Griquas	Buffalo City Stadium, East London
18:40		Scoreboard

===== Final =====
2011-10-14	Border Bulldogs	23–19	Eastern Province Kings	Boland Stadium, Wellington
13:30		Scoreboard

== Promotion/relegation play-off ==
2011-10-21	Falcons	20–22	Border Bulldogs	Barnard Stadium, Kempton Park
17:00		Scoreboard

Border Bulldogs were promoted to Division A. Falcons were relegated to Division B.

== See also ==
- 2011 Currie Cup Premier Division
- 2011 Currie Cup First Division
- 2011 Vodacom Cup
- 2011 Under-19 Provincial Championship
