= 2012 Under-21 Provincial Championship =

- Champions: Blue Bulls

The 2012 ABSA Under-21 Provincial Championship will be contested from 13 July to 27 October 2012. The tournament will feature the Under-21 players from the fourteen provincial rugby unions in South Africa.

== Competition ==
=== Division A ===
There are seven participating teams in the 2012 ABSA Under-21 Provincial Championship Division A. These teams will play each other twice over the course of the season, once at home and once away.

Teams will receive four points for a win and two points for a draw. Bonus points are awarded to teams that score 4 or more tries in a game, as well as to teams that lose a match by 7 points or less. Teams are ranked by points, then points difference (points scored less points conceded).

The top 4 teams will qualify for the title play-offs. In the semi-finals, the team that finish first has home advantage against the team that finish fourth, while the team that finish second has home advantage against the team that finish third. The winners of these semi-finals will play each other in the final, at the same venue as the 2012 Currie Cup Premier Division Final.

The bottom team in Division A will play a play-off game at home against the winner of the Division B final for a place in Division A in 2013.

=== Division B ===
There are seven participating teams in the 2012 ABSA Under-21 Provincial Championship Division B. These teams will play each other once over the course of the season, either at home or away.

Teams will receive four points for a win and two points for a draw. Bonus points are awarded to teams that score 4 or more tries in a game, as well as to teams that lose a match by 7 points or less. Teams are ranked by points, then points difference (points scored less points conceded).

The top 4 teams will qualify for the title play-offs. In the semi-finals, the team that finish first has home advantage against the team that finish fourth, while the team that finish second has home advantage against the team that finish third. The winners of these semi-finals will play each other in the final, at the same venue as the 2012 Currie Cup First Division Final.

The winner of the final will play a play-off game away from home against the bottom team in Division A for a place in Division A in 2013.

== Teams ==
Location of teams in 2012 ABSA Under-21 Provincial Championship
Division A
Division B

=== Team Listing ===
The following teams will take part in the 2012 ABSA Under-21 Provincial Championship competition:

Division A
Team	Stadium/s
Blue Bulls	Loftus Versfeld, Pretoria
Border Bulldogs	Buffalo City Stadium, East London
Free State Cheetahs	Free State Stadium, Bloemfontein
Golden Lions	Ellis Park Stadium, Johannesburg
Leopards	Olën Park, Potchefstroom
Sharks	Kings Park Stadium, Durban
Western Province	Newlands Stadium, Cape Town

Division B
Team	Stadium/s
Boland Cavaliers	Boland Stadium, Wellington
Eastern Province Kings	Nelson Mandela Bay Stadium, Port Elizabeth
Falcons	Barnard Stadium, Kempton Park
Griquas	Griqua Park, Kimberley
Griffons	North West Stadium, Welkom
Pumas	Mbombela Stadium, Mbombela
Pumas	Puma Stadium, Witbank
SWD Eagles	Outeniqua Park, George

== Division A ==
=== Table ===
2012 Under-21 Provincial Championship Division A table
Pos	Team	Pld	W	D	L	PF	PA	PD	TF	TA	TB	LB	Pts	Qualification
1	Blue Bulls	12	10	0	2	445	274	+171	51	30	8	2	50	Semi-finals
2	Sharks	12	9	0	3	376	302	+74	36	34	5	1	42	Semi-finals
3	Western Province	12	8	0	4	376	308	+68	49	36	7	2	41	Semi-finals
4	Free State Cheetahs	12	4	1	7	333	355	−22	42	37	7	3	28	Semi-finals
5	Golden Lions	12	4	1	7	352	324	+28	41	37	4	5	27	
6	Leopards	12	4	0	8	323	397	−74	42	50	7	4	27	
7	Border Bulldogs	12	2	0	10	250	495	−245	29	66	1	0	9	Relegation play-off

Rules for classification: 4 points for a win; 2 points for a draw; 1 bonus point for a loss by seven points or less; 1 bonus point for scoring four or more tries in a match.

=== Fixtures and results ===
- Fixtures are subject to change.
- All times are South African (GMT+2).

==== Regular season ====
===== Round one =====
13 July 2012	Border Bulldogs	28 – 23	Blue Bulls	Buffalo City Stadium, East London
19:00		Scoreboard		Referee: Rodney Boneparte

14 July 2012	Free State Cheetahs	28 – 0	Leopards	Shimla Park, Bloemfontein
13:00		Scoreboard		Referee: Jaco van Heerden

14 July 2012	Golden Lions	19 – 25	Western Province	UJ Stadium, Johannesburg
15:00		Scoreboard		Referee: Ben Crouse

Bye/s: Sharks

===== Round two =====
20 July 2012	Blue Bulls	28 – 25	Golden Lions	Loftus Versfeld, Pretoria
16:45		Scoreboard		Referee: Pieter Janse van Vuuren

20 July 2012	Sharks	31 – 9	Free State Cheetahs	Kings Park Stadium, Durban
18:00		Scoreboard		Referee: Lusanda Jam

21 July 2012	Leopards	27 – 29	Border Bulldogs	Olën Park, Potchefstroom
13:00		Scoreboard		Referee: Tiaan Jonker

Bye/s: Western Province

===== Round three =====
27 July 2012	Border Bulldogs	24 – 52	Sharks	Buffalo City Stadium, East London
17:05		Scoreboard		Referee: Dilbert November

28 July 2012	Western Province	23 – 35	Blue Bulls	Newlands Stadium, Cape Town
14:45		Scoreboard		Referee: Lusanda Jam

28 July 2012	Golden Lions	28 – 36	Leopards	Ellis Park Stadium, Johannesburg
17:00		Scoreboard		Referee: Gerrie de Bruin

Bye/s: Free State Cheetahs

===== Round four =====
3 August 2012	Sharks	19 – 15	Golden Lions	Kings Park Stadium, Durban
17:30		Scoreboard		Referee: Marius van der Westhuizen

4 August 2012	Free State Cheetahs	49 – 35	Border Bulldogs	Free State Stadium, Bloemfontein
11:50		Scoreboard		Referee: Tiaan Jonker

4 August 2012	Leopards	20 – 31	Western Province	Olën Park, Potchefstroom
13:00		Scoreboard		Referee: Pro Legoete

Bye/s: Blue Bulls

===== Round Five =====
10 August 2012	Blue Bulls	44 – 22	Leopards	Loftus Versfeld, Pretoria
16:45		Scoreboard		Referee: Matt Kemp

11 August 2012	Golden Lions	27 – 32	Free State Cheetahs	Ellis Park Stadium, Johannesburg
14:45		Scoreboard		Referee: Joey Salmans

11 August 2012	Western Province	14 – 18	Sharks	Newlands Stadium, Cape Town
16:45		Scoreboard		Referee: Rodney Boneparte

Bye/s: Border Bulldogs

===== Round Six =====
17 August 2012	Free State Cheetahs	31 – 36	Western Province	Free State Stadium, Bloemfontein
17:05		Scoreboard		Referee: Jaco van Heerden

17 August 2012	Border Bulldogs	13 – 22	Golden Lions	Buffalo City Stadium, East London
17:15		Scoreboard		Referee: Rodney Boneparte

18 August 2012	Sharks	19 – 34	Blue Bulls	Kings Park Stadium, Durban
16:45		Scoreboard		Referee: Tiaan Jonker

Bye/s: Leopards

===== Round Seven =====
25 August 2012	Leopards	35 – 40	Sharks	Olën Park, Potchefstroom
13:00		Scoreboard		Referee: Gerrie de Bruin

25 August 2012	Western Province	31 – 17	Border Bulldogs	Newlands Stadium, Cape Town
15:30		Scoreboard		Referee: Rasta Rasivhenge

25 August 2012	Blue Bulls	41 – 13	Free State Cheetahs	Loftus Versfeld, Pretoria
16:45		Scoreboard		Referee: Marius van der Westhuizen

Bye/s: Golden Lions

===== Round Eight =====
31 August 2012	Blue Bulls	57 – 21	Border Bulldogs	Loftus Versfeld, Pretoria
16:45		Scoreboard		Referee: Quinton Immelman

1 September 2012	Leopards	32 – 25	Free State Cheetahs	Olën Park, Potchefstroom
12:45		Scoreboard		Referee: Jaco van Heerden

1 September 2012	Western Province	27 – 28	Golden Lions	Newlands Stadium, Cape Town
16:45		Scoreboard		Referee: Archie Sehlako

Bye/s: Sharks

===== Round Nine =====
7 September 2012	Border Bulldogs	20 – 29	Leopards	Buffalo City Stadium, East London
17:05		Scoreboard		Referee: Tiaan Jonker

8 September 2012	Free State Cheetahs	28 – 40	Sharks	Free State Stadium, Bloemfontein
16:45		Scoreboard		Referee: François Groenewald

8 September 2012	Golden Lions	21 – 29	Blue Bulls	Ellis Park Stadium, Johannesburg
17:00		Scoreboard		Referee: Lusanda Jam

Bye/s: Western Province

===== Round Ten =====
14 September 2012	Leopards	37 – 36	Golden Lions	Olën Park, Potchefstroom
17:05		Scoreboard		Referee: Marius van der Westhuizen

14 September 2012	Blue Bulls	29 – 34	Western Province	Newlands Stadium, Cape Town
18:45		Scoreboard		Referee: Quinton Immelman

15 September 2012	Sharks	38 – 23	Border Bulldogs	Kings Park Stadium, Durban
21:15		Scoreboard		Referee: Jaco van Heerden

Bye/s: Free State Cheetahs

===== Round Eleven =====
21 September 2012	Border Bulldogs	8 – 29	Free State Cheetahs	Buffalo City Stadium, East London
17:15		Scoreboard		Referee: Matt Kemp

22 September 2012	Western Province	39 – 34	Leopards	Newlands Stadium, Cape Town
12:45		Scoreboard		Referee: Lusanda Jam

22 September 2012	Golden Lions	32 – 31	Sharks	Ellis Park Stadium, Johannesburg
16:45		Scoreboard		Referee: Gerrie de Bruin

Bye/s: Blue Bulls

===== Round Twelve =====
28 September 2012	Sharks	27 – 6	Western Province	Kings Park Stadium, Durban
16:45		Scoreboard		Referee: Ben Crouse

28 September 2012	Leopards	27 – 33	Blue Bulls	Olën Park, Potchefstroom
17:00		Scoreboard		Referee: Lourens van der Merwe

29 September 2012	Free State Cheetahs	32 – 32	Golden Lions	Free State Stadium, Bloemfontein
11:45		Scoreboard		Referee: Marius van der Westhuizen

Bye/s: Border Bulldogs

===== Round Thirteen =====
5 October 2012	Blue Bulls	61 – 17	Sharks	Loftus Versfeld, Pretoria
16:45		Scoreboard		Referee: Tiaan Jonker

5 October 2012	Golden Lions	67 – 15	Border Bulldogs	Ellis Park Stadium, Johannesburg
17:00		Scoreboard		Referee: Gerrie de Bruin

6 October 2012	Western Province	39 – 33	Free State Cheetahs	Newlands Stadium, Cape Town
15:30		Scoreboard		Referee: Ben Crouse

Bye/s: Leopards

===== Round Fourteen =====
12 October 2012	Sharks	44 – 21	Leopards	Kings Park Stadium, Durban
16:45		Scoreboard		Referee: Ben Crouse

12 October 2012	Border Bulldogs	17 – 71	Western Province	Buffalo City Stadium, East London
17:00		Scoreboard		Referee: Archie Sehlako

13 October 2012	Free State Cheetahs	24 – 31	Blue Bulls	Free State Stadium, Bloemfontein
14:45		Scoreboard		Referee: Tiaan Jonker

Bye/s: Golden Lions

==== Play-off games ====
===== Semi-finals =====
20 October 2012	Sharks	18 – 19	Western Province	Kings Park Stadium, Durban
14:05		Scoreboard		Referee: Ben Crouse

20 October 2012	Blue Bulls	50 – 24	Free State Cheetahs	Loftus Versfeld, Pretoria
17:00		Scoreboard		Referee: Marius van der Westhuizen

===== Final =====
27 October 2012	Western Province	13 – 22	Blue Bulls	Kings Park Stadium, Durban
14:00		Scoreboard		Referee: Lourens van der Merwe

== Division B ==
=== Table ===
2012 Under-21 Provincial Championship Division B table
Pos	Team	Pld	W	D	L	PF	PA	PD	TF	TA	TB	LB	Pts	Qualification
1	Eastern Province Kings	6	6	0	0	295	76	+219	40	8	5	0	29	Semi-Finals
2	SWD Eagles	6	4	0	2	179	123	+56	19	13	3	1	20	Semi-Finals
3	Pumas	6	3	1	2	143	171	−28	19	21	3	1	18	Semi-Finals
4	Griquas	6	3	0	3	154	140	+14	20	13	3	2	17	Semi-Finals
5	Falcons	6	3	1	2	157	195	−38	19	28	3	0	17	
6	Boland Cavaliers	6	1	0	5	111	194	−83	12	26	2	2	8	
7	Griffons	6	0	0	6	123	263	−140	17	37	2	2	4	

Rules for classification: 4 points for a win; 2 points for a draw; 1 bonus point for a loss by seven points or less; 1 bonus point for scoring four or more tries in a match.
The title play-off winner play in a promotion play-off game.

=== Fixtures and results ===
- Fixtures are subject to change.
- All times are South African (GMT+2).

==== Regular season ====
===== Round one =====
17 August 2012	Eastern Province Kings	61 – 10	Boland Cavaliers	Nelson Mandela Bay Stadium, Port Elizabeth
16:30		Scoreboard		Referee: Quinton Immelman

17 August 2012	Pumas	14 – 16	Griquas	Mbombela Stadium, Mbombela
16:30		Scoreboard		Referee: Eduan Nel

17 August 2012	Griffons	27 – 31	Falcons	North West Stadium, Welkom
18:00		Scoreboard		Referee: Jaco Kotze

Bye/s: SWD Eagles

===== Round two =====
24 August 2012	Boland Cavaliers	20 – 24	Pumas	Boland Park, Worcester
12:50		Scoreboard		Referee: Cwengile Jadezweni

24 August 2012	SWD Eagles	22 – 31	Eastern Province Kings	Outeniqua Park, George
17:05		Scoreboard		Referee: Daniel Fortuin

25 August 2012	Griquas	40 – 14	Griffons	Griqua Park, Kimberley
12:45		Scoreboard		Referee: Pieter Janse van Vuuren

Bye/s: Falcons

===== Round three =====
1 September 2012	Pumas	32 – 27	SWD Eagles	Puma Stadium, Witbank
12:30		Scoreboard		Referee: Stephan Geldenhuys

31 August 2012	Boland Cavaliers	16 – 21	Griquas	Hugenote Hoërskool
16:00		Scoreboard		Referee: Dilbert November

1 September 2012	Falcons	14 – 46	Eastern Province Kings	John Vorster Stadium, Nigel
15:00		Scoreboard		Referee: Renier Vermeulen

Bye/s: Griffons

===== Round four =====
7 September 2012	SWD Eagles	15 – 10	Griquas	Outeniqua Park, George
17:15		Scoreboard		Referee: Mlungiseli Mdashe

8 September 2012	Falcons	27 – 27	Pumas	Barnard Stadium, Kempton Park
12:40		Scoreboard		Referee: Stephan Geldenhuys

8 September 2012	Griffons	12 – 30	Boland Cavaliers	North West Stadium, Welkom
13:40		Scoreboard		Referee: Oregopotse Rametsi

Bye/s: Eastern Province Kings

===== Round Five =====
14 September 2012	Eastern Province Kings	73 – 3	Griffons	Nelson Mandela Bay Stadium, Port Elizabeth
16:30		Scoreboard		Referee: Gerrie de Bruin

15 September 2012	Griquas	36 – 38	Falcons	Griqua Park, Kimberley
12:45		Scoreboard		Referee: Pro Legoete

15 September 2012	Boland Cavaliers	13 – 39	SWD Eagles	Boland Stadium, Wellington
13:50		Scoreboard		Referee: François Groenewald

Bye/s: Pumas

===== Round Six =====
21 September 2012	Eastern Province Kings	43 – 3	Pumas	Nelson Mandela Bay Stadium, Port Elizabeth
17:05		Scoreboard		Referee: François Groenewald

22 September 2012	Falcons	37 – 29	Boland Cavaliers	Barnard Stadium, Kempton Park
12:30		Scoreboard		Referee: Eduan Nel

22 September 2012	Griffons	27 – 46	SWD Eagles	North West Stadium, Welkom
13:20		Scoreboard		Referee: Jaco Kotze

Bye/s: Griquas

===== Round Seven =====
28 September 2012	Pumas	43 – 40	Griffons	Puma Stadium, Witbank
14:30		Scoreboard		Referee: Francois Pretorius

28 September 2012	SWD Eagles	30 – 10	Falcons	Outeniqua Park, George
15:00		Scoreboard		Referee: Joey Salmans

29 September 2012	Griquas	31 – 43	Eastern Province Kings	Griqua Park, Kimberley
15:30		Scoreboard		Referee: Daniel Fortuin

Bye/s: Boland Cavaliers

==== Play-off games ====
===== Semi-finals =====
5 October 2012	Eastern Province Kings	67 – 5	Griquas	Nelson Mandela Bay Stadium, Port Elizabeth
16:30		Scoreboard		Referee: Stephan Geldenhuys

6 October 2012	SWD Eagles	61 – 13	Pumas	Outeniqua Park, George
15:00		Scoreboard		Referee: Rodney Boneparte

===== Final =====
13 October 2012	Eastern Province Kings	24 – 10	SWD Eagles	Nelson Mandela Bay Stadium, Port Elizabeth
12:00		Scoreboard		Referee: Daniel Fortuin

== Promotion/relegation play-off ==
19 October 2012	Border Bulldogs	21 – 15	Eastern Province Kings	Buffalo City Stadium, East London
17:00		Scoreboard		Referee: Quinton Immelman

- Border Bulldogs remain in Division A.
- Eastern Province Kings remain in Division B.

== See also ==
- 2012 Currie Cup Premier Division
- 2012 Currie Cup First Division
- 2012 Vodacom Cup
- 2012 Under-19 Provincial Championship
