= Coetzenburg Stadium =

Sports venue in Stellenbosch, South Africa

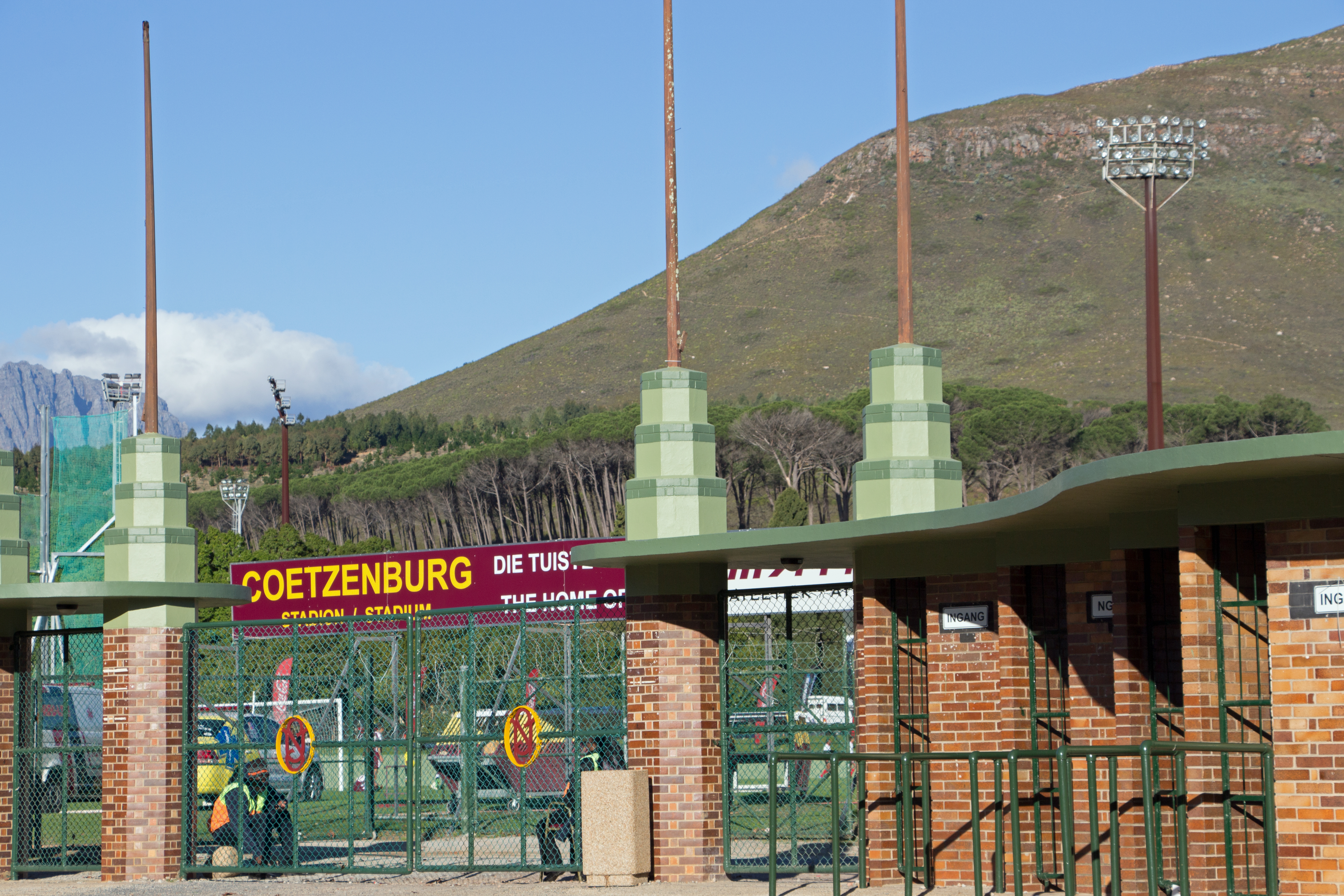
- Entrance to the stadium
- Interactive map of Coetzenburg Stadium
- Location: Stellenbosch
- Coordinates: 33.940°S 18.870°E
- Owner: Stellenbosch University
- Operator: Stellenbosch University
- Capacity: 8,000
- Surface: Grass

Tenants
- Stellenbosch University; Stellenbosch FC; Santos FC

Coetzenburg Stadium is a multi-sports venue in Stellenbosch, South Africa, on a portion of the old Coetsenburg Estate which was founded by Dirk Coetsee in 1682 after a grant of land from the Dutch Governor of the Cape Colony Simon van der Stel. The stadium is owned by the Stellenbosch University.

The stadium is used by both Stellenbosch F.C. and Stellenbosch University.

It is adjacent to the Danie Craven Stadium.

== See also ==
- Coetsenburg
- Dirk Coetsee
- Stellenbosch Mountain
- Assegaaibosch
