= Danie Craven Stadium =

Rugby stadium in Stellenbosch, South Africa

- Interactive map of Danie Craven Stadium
- Full name: Danie Craven Stadium
- Location: Stellenbosch, South Africa
- Coordinates: 33°56′24″S 18°52′25″E
- Owner: Stellenbosch University
- Capacity: 16,000
- Surface: Grass

Construction
- Opened: 1979

Tenants
- Stellenbosch University; Stellenbosch F.C.

The Danie Craven Stadium is a rugby union stadium in Stellenbosch, South Africa. Built in 1979, it is part of the Stellenbosch University's sport facilities. The stadium was named after rugby administrator and Springbok scrum half Danie Craven. The stadium holds 16,000 people.

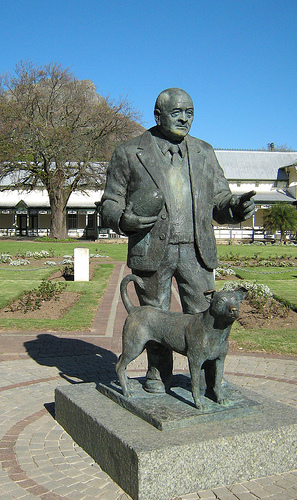
Danie Craven Statue

The stadium was built on a portion of the old Coetsenburg Estate which was founded by Dirk Coetsee in 1682 after a grant of land from the Dutch Governor of the Cape Colony Simon van der Stel.

The Danie Craven Stadium has mostly been used for rugby matches. The stadium played host to several games of the Varsity Cup, South Africa's premier inter-university rugby tournament since 2008. In the first three years of the Varsity Cup (2008–2010) the final also took place at the stadium. In 2008 the final was played between Maties (Stellenbosch University) and the Ikey Tigers (University of Cape Town). In 2009 the final was played between Maties and Pukke (North-West University). In 2010, the final was – again – played between the Maties and the Ikey Tigers. The Maties won these three tournaments. Subsequently the Varsity Cup final has been played in this stadium in 2013 (Maties lost to University of Pretoria Tuks), 2016 (Maties lost to Pukke), 2018 and 2019 (Maties beat Pukke and Tuks respectively).

In 2020, soccer club Stellenbosch F.C. started using the stadium for most of its matches played at home.

In the 1995 Rugby World Cup, the stadium hosted the game between Australia and Romania on 3 June.

The stadium also played host to the 2007 Touch Football World Cup where it saw Australia claim the title of World Champions for another four years.

== Sponsorship ==
In August 2026, Stellenbosch University and Maties Rugby Club signed a naming deal with financial firm Salt EB, with the stadium to be renamed "The Danie Craven Stadium powered by Salt EB".

== See also ==
- Coetsenburg
- Dirk Coetsee
- Stellenbosch Mountain
- Assegaaibosch
