= Dirk Coetsee =

Dirk Coetzee/Coetsee (1655 – 1725) was a Dutch colonist and the Hoofdheemraad (Chancellor) of the District of Stellenbosch and Drakenstein in South Africa for most of the 1690s and early 1700s. He also served as captain of the Stellenbosch Infantry and deacon of the Stellenbosch Moederkerk (Dutch Reformed Mother Church) at different points in time. As captain of the Stellenbosch Infantry, which comprised mostly Huguenots, he provided military backing for a rebellion which began in 1706 against the Governor of the Cape Colony, Willem Adriaan van der Stel, whom the vrijburghers (free burghers, i.e. citizens of the colony not in the employ of the Dutch East India Company) had accused of tyranny, corruption and racketeering. Coetsee was imprisoned in the dungeon of the Castle of Good Hope along with the other leaders of the Huguenots but he was released after a year. The rebellion ultimately succeeded in 1707 when the Dutch East India Company recalled the Governor and other colonial officials. An account of the rebellion is vividly described in the "Diary of Adam Tas".

Dirk Coetzee/Coetsee established Coetzenburg/Coetsenburg, one of the oldest wine estates in South Africa, in 1682, on land granted to him by the Dutch Governor of the Cape Colony, Simon van der Stel, on the banks of the Eerste River at the foot of the Stellenbosch Mountain. He was the progenitor (Afrikaans: stamvader) of the influential Coetzee / Coetsee family in South Africa, a branch of which became Anglicized through intermarriage with the British Establishment after the British conquest in 1795.

== Origins of the surname Coetzee / Coetsee ==
The surname Coetzee/Coetsee is of French Huguenot origin, originally spelt de Couches The De Couches family were French Protestants (known as Huguenots) of Breton origin and nobles of the Ancien Régime, specifically seigneurs or feudal lords, which owned the medieval Château (Castle) of Couches as well as the medieval Château (Castle) of Dracy-lès-Couches. The Château de Couches is located in the commune of Couches in Saône-et-Loire, below the town, on a flat area overlooking the Creuse valley. It is one of the old fortresses of the Duchy of Burgundy and was used in particular to protect the road leading from Paris to Chalon via Autun. The Castle of Dracy-lès-Couches is located in the town of Dracy-lès-Couches in Saône-et-Loire, on the side of a slope. Surnames were only recorded for taxation purposes and many officials of the Dutch East India Company were semi-literate, but this was also before the time of canonised spelling conventions, and thus there are a number of variations of the surname in South Africa, e.g. Coetzee, Coetse, Coussé. Coetsenburg, the family's wine estate in Stellenbosch, is often spelt Coetzenburg. The De Couches family also had homes in Le Marais in Paris which they fled with other Émigrés after the St. Bartholomew’s Day Massacre in 1572. They resettled initially in Amsterdam in the Dutch Republic and later moved to Kampen in the Overijssel where they Dutchified and established themselves. A branch of the family intermarried with the British and Anglicized after the British conquest in 1795 and the Coetsenburg Estate is now under their custodianship.

== The Anglicization of the Coetzee/Coetsee family and the Cape Dutch regenten ==
Following the British conquest of the Cape in 1795, the Dutch elite of Cape Town – known locally in Dutch as the regenten or bestuurs-elite - quickly developed a sense of class solidarity with British officials. Intermarriage was not uncommon, due mainly to the dearth of marriageable expatriate British women at the Cape in the early years. The children of leading Dutch citizens were often educated in English. These relationships extended beyond Cape Town into the farming districts of Stellenbosch and Franschhoek. Indeed, under British rule there was no great divide between the urban Dutch bourgeoisie and the leading wine farmers.

British officials commonly owned land and slaves themselves, and there was a concentration of farming resources and official patronage in the leading families. This urban-rural elite was heavily intermarried, and linked by an extensive credit network. The same names recur wherever landed wealth, power and patronage were to be found – Van Der Bijl (Van Der Byl), Cloete, Meijburgh (Myburgh), Coetzee/Coetsee, De Villiers, Marais are some. 21 families, mostly well connected and interrelated with high officials, produced over half of the colony’s wine and also owned some two-thirds of the wine farm slave population by the 1820s. Moreover, there had been a strong degree of continuity in the identity of this elite over generations. The wine farmers were undoubtedly the landed gentry of the Cape. The British set about cementing their alliances with the older colonial population by promoting agricultural production, particularly in the wine industry. This "Old Money" still holds substantial land and power in South Africa. Gradually, many of the Cape Dutch-Huguenot families thus became Anglicized, including the Coetsee family.

== Family and early life ==
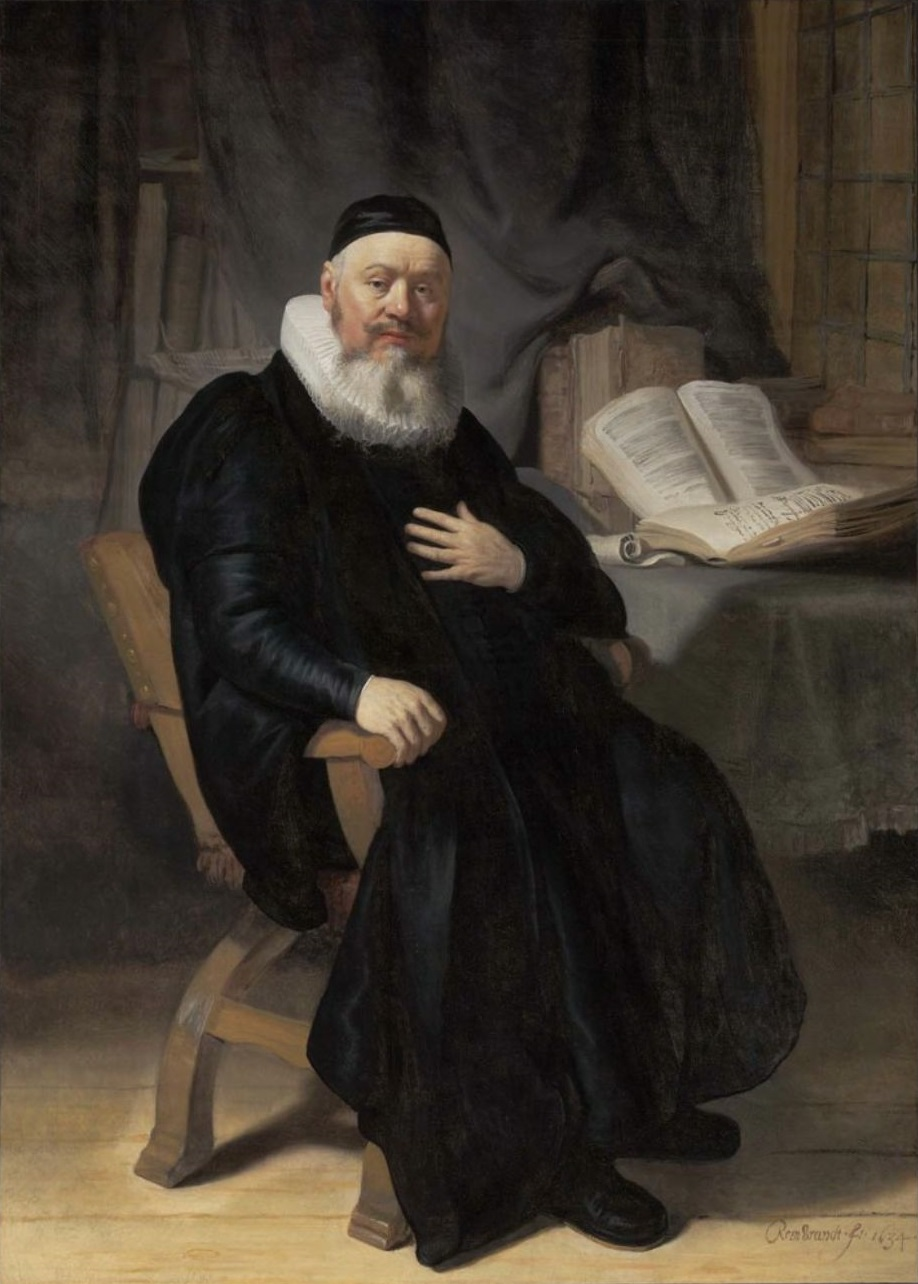
A portrait of Reverend Johannes Elison, Sara Coetzee/Coetsee's maternal grandfather, painted by Rembrandt.

Dirk de Couches (Couches evolved into Coetzee/Coetsee after his emigration to the Dutch Cape Colony) was born in Kampen in 1655. Dirk was a son of Gerard de Couches and Margaretha Claasdogter.

Coetzee/Coetsee married Sara van der Schulp (1654 – Feb 1728) who was born in Amsterdam in 1654. She was the daughter of Jacob van der Schulp (1634- Feb 1728) and Maria van der Schulp (née Elison). Maria van der Schulp was the daughter of Johannes Elison (b. 11 April 1581, d. 19 August 1639) and Maria Bockenolle who were both painted by Rembrandt during his early years in Amsterdam. Rembrandt’s innovative and fashionable portrait paintings were a key factor in his growing reputation. Reverend Johannes Elison was minister of the Dutch Reformed Church in Norwich, England. In seventeenth century Dutch society, Protestant ministers were celebrated public figures. The portraits of Elison and his wife, now in the Museum of Fine Arts in Boston were probably commissioned by their son, a wealthy Amsterdam merchant. Such full-length portraits were substantially more costly than the more common bust and half-length formats. Rembrandt painted only three full-length portrait pairs, all about 1634, when he was trying to establish himself as an independent master.

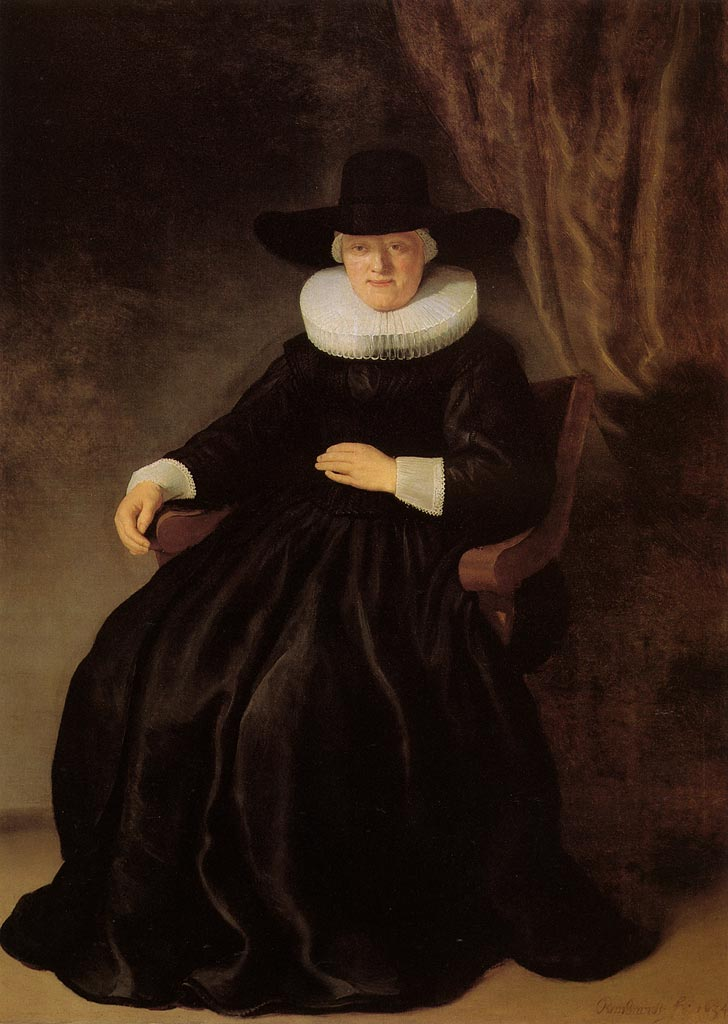
A portrait of Maria Bockenolle, Sara Coetzee/Coetsee's maternal grandmother, painted by Rembrandt.

Like the sons of many established Émigré families in Kampen, Dirk de Couches pursued a career as an officer in the Dutch navy. Since the founding of the Dutch Cape Colony in 1652, the Dutch East India Company had offered land to its employees to cultivate crops and raise livestock to sell to the Company at a fixed price. Simon van der Stel, the last Commander and first Governor of the Dutch Cape Colony, expanded this policy by encouraging Dutch and later French immigration and distribution of land to willing farmers. When the Franco-Dutch War (1672–1678) ended, there were few opportunities in the Dutch Republic for young people. There had also been a series of disastrous floods that had further depressed the Dutch economy. Thus in 1678, Dirk de Couches (Coetzee/Coetsee) decided to relocate to the Cape of Good Hope where the Dutch East India Company had established a permanent settlement in 1652.

The logo of the Dutch East India Company (Vereenigde Oost-Indische Compagnie or VOC in Dutch, literally "United East Indian Company").

== Dirk Coetsee emigration to the Dutch Cape Colony in 1679 ==
By this time, Dirk was an adelborst eerste klasse (English: a navy cadet equal to a second lieutenant. It is unclear whether his wife Sara Coetzee/Coetsee joined him on his initial trip out or whether she joined him at a later stage. In any event, Dirk Coetzee/Coetsee left the port of Texel in North Holland aboard the Dutch East India ship the Asia (Dutch: Azië) on 19 December 1678 bound for Table Bay. The Asia was a frigate, built in 1671 by the Amsterdam Chamber (Kamer) of the Dutch East India Company at the Oostenburg shipyard in Amsterdam. It was 160 foot long, 39 foot wide, with a deadweight tonnage of 1140.

On 8 May 1679, the Asia cast its anchor in Table Bay, Cape Town. (The Asia sunk after a storm off the coast of Cape Verde in 1683 on its return journey to the Netherlands from Batavia. It had sailed on only eight voyages in total, between Texel and Batavia via the Cape of Good Hope).

== Huis Herengracht (Herengracht House), Cape Town ==
Dirk and Sara Coetzee/Coetsee initially settled in a house on the western side of the Herengracht (now Adderley Street), which they called Huis Herengracht (Herengracht House), in Cape Town. Adderley Street was originally named the Herengracht, after the canal ("gracht") which ran down its centre, and which had its origins in the rivers flowing down to the sea from Table Mountain, and the lords or patricians ("heren") which established their townhouses in the street. At the time the street was more of a wide walkway beside the canal, which was crossed by various stone bridges. The network of canals were covered over, throughout Cape Town, in the 1860s. The Herengracht river and canal therefore became an underground pipe-line. For many years the street was residential, lined with large oak trees. The Herengracht was also so-named because of the Herengracht in Amsterdam as most of the first European settlers of Cape Town were Dutch.

Huis Herengracht had a stoep (veranda) that opened onto the Herengracht and overlooked the Grand Parade. It is located between Castle (Krotoa Place) and Hout Streets but closer to Castle Street, opposite to where the Golden Acres shopping centre currently stands. In the record of the deed of transfer in the Deeds Office in Cape Town, it is listed as being erf E4574 in the "Heere Gragt in Block C, no.2 - date 3 June 1728 - bordered to the north-east by the erf of the Honourable Lord de Wet, to the north-west by the erf of Advocate Aalders and south-west by the captain of engineering the Honourable Lord Tiebault and surgeon Grimbeek". Like other remaining townhouses of the Dutch period in this affluent street, Huis Herengracht is double-storeyed with pedimented façades (dwarf gables) with a pitched roof and triangular gable ends. Prior to land reclamation, Huis Herengracht was located near the sea and its address was 2 Herengracht, Cape Town but is currently 52 Adderley Street, Cape Town. Dirk and Sara Coetsee lived in Huis Herengracht for four years.[14]

In 1682, the Dutch Governor of the Cape Colony, Simon van der Stel, granted Coetzee/Coetsee land at the foot of the Stellenbosch Mountain on the banks of the Eerste River which Coetsee named Coetsenburg.[4] After moving onto Coetzenburg/Coetsenburg, the Coetzee/Coetsees used Huis Herengracht as their townhouse.

== Coetzenburg/Coetsenburg Estate ==
The name of the wine estate, Coetzenburg/Coetsenburg, is an amalgamation of the Dutch words "Coetzee/Coetsee s’n Burg", a colloquial form of "Coetzee/Coetsee en zijn Burg" which contains a double entendre. Coetzee/Coetsee is the surname of the estate’s founder, Dirk Coetzee/Coetsee, a one-time captain of the Stellenbosch schutterij (civic guard or infantry) and Hoofdheemraad (mayor) of Stellenbosch.(Newton-King, Susan (November 2007). "Sodomy, Race and Respectability in Stellenbosch and Drakenstein, 1689–1762". Kronos. 33: 6–44.) In Dutch and German, "burg" means "fortress, castle, citadel, stronghold or acropolis" (the first permanent European settlers in the area were primarily Dutch-speaking). However, in Afrikaans, "berg" and "burg" mean "mountain". Thus "Coetzenburg/Coetsenburg" can be interpreted either as "Coetzee/Coetsee and his Mountain" or "Coetzee/Coetsee and his Fortress". The mountain referred to in the name is the Groteberg or Stellenbosch Mountain, part of which is on the estate.

The Coetsenburg Estate lies on the banks of the Eerste River in the town of Stellenbosch in the Western Cape province of South Africa. Stellenbosch is the second oldest European settlement in South Africa, after Cape Town. The town became known as the City of Oaks or Eikestad in Dutch and Afrikaans due to the large number of oak trees that were planted by its founder, the Dutch Governor of the Cape Colony Simon van der Stel, to grace its streets and homesteads. One gains access to the estate via Coetzenburg Road which crosses the Eerste River over an old wagon bridge at the site of the original ford, which is known as a drift in South Africa. The estate stretches up southwards from the Eerste River onto the slopes of the Stellenbosch Mountain, which is part of the Hottentots Holland mountain range, to the Blaauwklippen River (Blouklip River) which forms its southern boundary. Westwards, the estate borders the Coetzenburg Sports Grounds of the University of Stellenbosch, Paul Roos Gymnasium and the old Welgevallen Farm (Rhodes Fruit Farms) which is now the suburbs of Brandwacht, Dalsig, Anesta, Eden and La Pastorale. Eastwards the estate stretches into the Jonkershoek Valley to the Hottentots Holland Catchment Area and, to the south-east, the Assegaaibosch Nature Reserve which was once the Assegaai Bosch Estate, also owned by the founder of Coetsenburg, Dirk Coetsee.

C.C. de Villiers wrote in 1892 in the "Ancestry Registers of Old Cape Families" ("Geslagsregisters van Ou Kaapse Families") about Dirk Coetsee: "After 1685 he was in the service of the church (the Moederkerk or Mother Church of the Dutch Reformed Church) as deacon and elder, and after 1687, he was in the college of heemraden (aldermen). In 1706, he became captain of the Stellenbosch Infantry. In 1682, he approached Commander Simon van der Stel and was in particular given a piece of land or place later called Coetsenburg, located close to Stellenbosch. He also has a piece of land in Jan Jonkershoek (the Jonkershoek Valley), under the big mountain (Stellenbosch Mountain), called Assegaaibosch. A branch of the family intermarried with the British and Anglicized after the British conquest in 1795 and the Coetzenburg/Coetsenburg Estate is now under their custodianship.

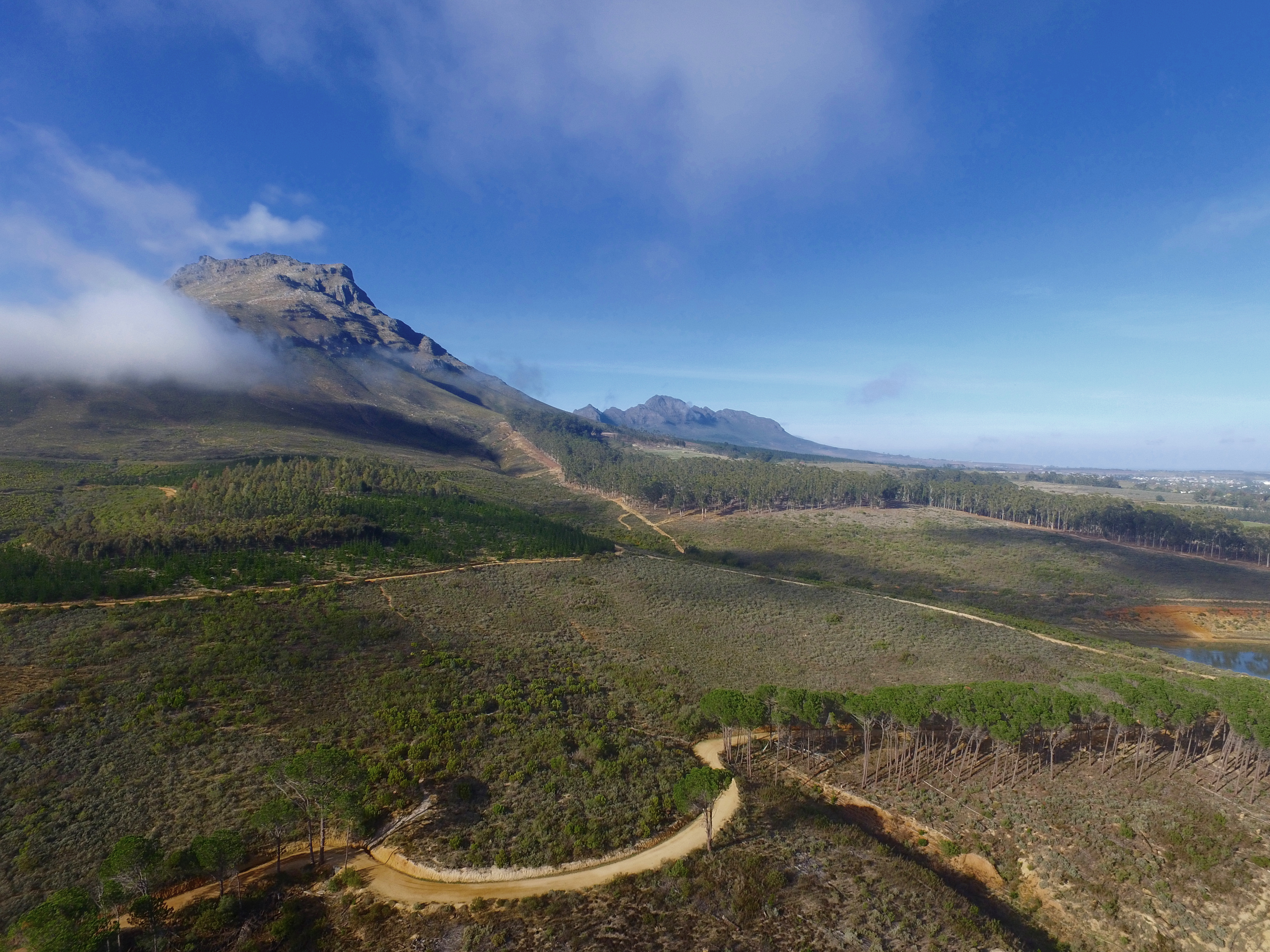
An eastern view across Coetzenburg/Coetsenburg Estate to the Stellenbosch Mountain.

== The 1706–1707 Huguenot rebellion against Governor Willem Adriaan van der Stel ==
In 1706, Dirk Coetzee/Coetsee became the captain of the Stellenbocsch Infantry (Stellenbosch schutterij), replacing Henning Hüsing, the owner of the Meerlust Estate. At the time, the Netherlands was engaged in the War of the Spanish Succession (1702–1714) against France. Because the Stellenbosch Infantry was composed mainly of French Huguenots, and given Dirk Coetzee/Coetsee's high status in the Huguenot-Cape Dutch colony, Coetzee/Coetsee became involved in organizing a revolt against the Dutch Governor Willem Adriaan van der Stel, under the leadership of Adam Tas and Henning Hüsing, who charged the Governor with corruption relating to his enormous estate Vergelegen and monopolizing the wine and meat trade which left the burghers of the Cape Colony at a disadvantage. Henning Hüsing was the German husband of Tas’s Huguenot aunt. Tas was the very wealthy owner (by marriage) of a collection of estates with his home at Meerlust. Hüsing and Tas conspired with fellow Huguenots to establish a secret society called the "Brotherhood" to oust the Dutch Governor Willem Adriaan van der Stel. Their plan was to petition the Heeren XVII (the Lords Seventeen) of the Dutch East India Company based in Batavia directly. Dirk Coetzee/Coetsee, as captain of the Stellenbosch Infantry, ensured that their plot was backed up by military force in the event that the petition failed.

Adam Tas, representing farming burghers, drew up the formal memorandum of complaint. Dirk Coetzee/Coetsee was a signatory to the memorandum. In the memorandum the signatories accused Governor Willem Adriaan van der Stel and Company officials of illicit farming and trading, illegal landholding and setting up of illicit monopolies on the sale of wine, wheat, and meat. The Governor got wind of the rebellion and ordered a military raid of the estates of the conspirators. At Meerlust, the military officials discovered Tas' diary in a drawer of his desk (this diary was discovered by accident by a librarian of the University of Cape Town in 1911 and is now available for purchase in Dutch and English). The diary contained evidence that incriminated the conspirators. The Governor thus ordered their arrest. After a mock trial, Van der Stel had the leaders of the rebellion, including Hüsing, Tas and Coetsee, thrown into the notorious "Black Hole" dungeon of the Castle of Good Hope.

However, fearing a broader rebellion in the Cape, and possibly the exposure of their own corruption, the Dutch East India Company removed the Governor, the Secunde (Lieutenant Governor) Samuel Elsevier, the Minister Petrus Calden and the Landdrost (magistrate) of Stellenbosch, Johannes Starrenburg, from their posts and they ordered that all the land in possession of Company officials had to be disposed of. In addition, the monopolies were rescinded. This meant that the Dutch East India Company re-asserted the official Company policy with regards to prohibiting the involvement of Company officials in farming and trading activities and restricting them to their official administrative responsibilities. All political prisoners were released from the Castle and the Huguenots celebrated their victory. On 31 December 1708, Dirk Coetzee/Coetsee began his last term as Hoofdheemraad of Stellenbosch.(Newton-King, Susan (November 2007). "Sodomy, Race and Respectability in Stellenbosch and Drakenstein, 1689–1762". Kronos. 33: 6–44.)<

== Subsequent public service ==
In the Cape Colony, the Board of the Landdrost (Magistrate) and Heemraad (Council) governed the country districts and answered directly to the Governor. The Cape Colony was divided into four districts: District of the Cape, District of Stellenbosch and Drakenstein, District of Zwellendam and District of Graaff Reynet.

Dirk Coetzee/Coetsee served as Hoofdheemraad (Chancellor) of the District of Stellenbosch and Drakenstein, from 1689 to 1690; 1693–1694; 1697–1698; 1702–1704; and 1709–1710. There were four Heemraden (council members) of which one was elected the Hoofdheemraad (Chancellor), all serving the district for two-year terms under the Landdrost (magistrate). Prior to the rebellion of 1706-1707, the Landdrosts were not vryburghers (i.e. citizens in the employ of the Dutch East India Company) but born in the Dutch Republic and brought to the Cape by the Company to serve in their official capacities.

To serve in this position, one had to be a prominent and upstanding member of the community, above the age of 30 and owner of land. As it was viewed as a position of honour, one had to serve voluntarily and without pay.

Dirk Coetzee/Coetsee served as Captain of the Stellenbosch Infantry from 1607 to 1608, succeeding Henning Hüsing, the owner of the Meerlust Estate. He was a deacon in the Stellenbosch Moederkerk (Dutch Reformed Mother Church) from 1691 to 1692; 1698–1699; 1702–1703.

== Retirement ==
In 1721, Dirk’s son Gerrit and his wife Susanna Coetzee/Coetsee took over Coetzenburg/Coetsenburg and the now elderly couple Dirk and Sara Coetzee/Coetsee retired to their townhouse, Huis Herengracht, in the Herengracht (now Adderley Street) in Cape Town, where Dirk died on 25 June 1725. Sara Coetzee/Coetsee died in February 1728. Like most of the Dutch Cape Colony's ruling elite, Dirk and Sara Coetzee/Coetsee were buried in the Groote Kerk in the Herengracht (Adderley Street) in Cape Town.

Note: There are many variations of the surname spelling but as the reference material, links and maps names used to create this article are mostly spelt as Coetzee and not Coetsee it should be noted in the contents in both variations.

== See also ==
- Coetzenburg/Coetsenburg, one of the oldest wine estates in South Africa, established by Dirk Coetzee/Coetsee in 1682
- Assegaaibosch, currently a nature reserve and formerly an estate belonging to the Coetzee/Coetsee family
- Stellenbosch Mountain, a mountain on the Coetsenburg Estate
