= Coetsenburg =

Historic wine estate in South Africa

Coordinates: 33°56′25″S 18°52′12″E

Coetzenburg is an historic wine estate and one of the oldest estates in South Africa, established in 1682. It is located at the foot of the Stellenbosch Mountain, which forms part of the estate, in the town of Stellenbosch, 31 miles (50 km) east of Cape Town, in the Cape Winelands of the Western Cape Province. The estate has historically been owned by the Coetsee family and is currently not open to the public. The north-western portion of the original estate is now the Coetzenburg Sports Grounds which belongs to the Stellenbosch University.

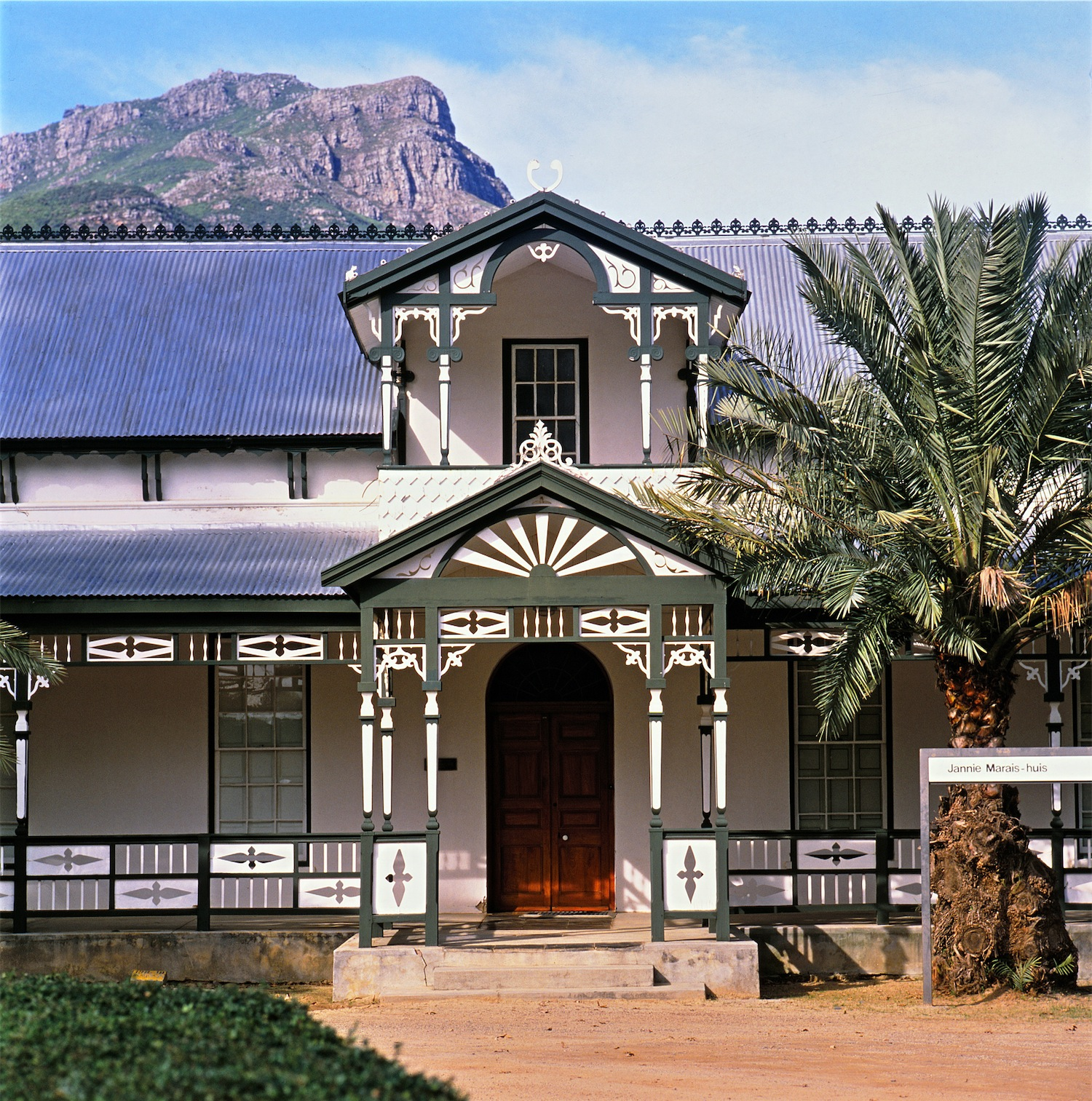
Jannie Marais House at Coetzenburg Estate

== Name ==
Coetzenburg is owned by the Coetsee family which is Cape Dutch (specifically French Huguenot) in origin. Over the past centuries, the family intermarried with members of the British Establishment and, like another prominent Cape Dutch family, the Van Der Byls (Van Der Bijls), are now predominantly English-speaking. The name of the estate, Coetzenburg, is an amalgamation of the Dutch words “Coetsee s’n Burg”, a colloquial form of “Coetsee en zijn Burg”. Coetsee is the surname of the estate's founder, Dirk Coetsee, the Hoofdheemraad (Chancellor) of the District of Stellenbosch and Drakenstein through much of the 1690s and early 1700s and captain of the Stellenbosch Infantry. In Dutch and German, “burg” means “fortress, castle, citadel, stronghold or acropolis” (the first permanent European settlers in the area were primarily Dutch-speaking). Thus “Coetzenburg” means “Coetsee and his Fortress”. The incorrect form "Coetsenberg" refers to the Stellenbosch Mountain which is situated partly on Coetzenburg Estate.

The surname Coetsee is of French Huguenot origin, originally spelt de Couches. The De Couches family, which is Breton, were nobles of the Ancien Régime, seigneurs or feudal lords, which owned the medieval Château (Castle) of Couches as well as the medieval Château (Castle) of Dracy-lès-Couches. The Château de Couches is located in the commune of Couches in Saône-et-Loire, below the town, on a flat area overlooking the Creuse valley. It is one of the old fortresses of the Duchy of Burgundy and was used in particular to protect the road leading from Paris to Chalon via Autun. The Castle of Dracy-lès-Couches is located in the town of Dracy-lès-Couches in Saône-et-Loire, on the side of a slope. The family also had homes in Le Marais, Paris, which they fled after the St. Bartholomew's Day Massacre, and settled first in Amsterdam in the Dutch Republic, before moving to Kampen in the Overijssel where they Dutchified. Dirk Coetsee left the Netherlands in 1679 aboard the Asia, a Dutch East India Company ship, and settled initially in Huis Herengracht (Herengracht House) in the Herengracht (now Adderley Street) between Hout and Krotoa Place (Castle) Streets, Cape Town, in the Dutch Cape Colony before the Dutch Governor of the Cape Colony Simon van der Stel granted him land in 1682 which he named Coetzenburg.

Since surnames were only recorded for taxation purposes and many officials of the Dutch East India Company were illiterate, the surname was regularly misspelled in registries and other official records and thus there are a number of variations of the surname in South Africa, e.g. Coetzee, Coetse, Coussé. Coetzenburg is often incorrectly spelt Coetzenburg. A branch of the Coetsee family became Anglicized through intermarriage after the British conquest of the Dutch Cape Colony in 1795 and Coetzenburg is now under their custodianship.

== Location ==
The Coetzenburg Estate lies on the banks of the Eerste River at the foot of the Stellenbosch Mountain in the town of Stellenbosch in the Western Cape province of South Africa. Stellenbosch is part of the Cape Winelands and is renowned for its viticulture, orchards and picturesque mountain scenery. Stellenbosch is the second oldest European settlement in South Africa, after Cape Town. The town became known as the City of Oaks or Eikestad in Dutch and Afrikaans due to the large number of oak trees that were planted by its founder, the Dutch Governor of the Cape Colony Simon van der Stel, to grace its streets and homesteads. One gains access to the estate via Coetzenburg Road which crosses the Eerste River over an old wagon bridge at the site of the original ford, which is known as a drift in South Africa. The estate stretches all the way up southwards from the Eerste River onto the slopes of the Stellenbosch Mountain, which is part of the Hottentots Holland range, to the Blaauwklippen River which forms its southern boundary. Westwards, the estate borders the Coetzenburg Sports Grounds of the University of Stellenbosch, Paul Roos Gymnasium and the old Welgevallen Farm (one of the farms that formed part of Rhodes Fruit Farms) which is now the suburbs of Brandwacht, Dalsig, Anesta, Eden and La Pastorale. Eastwards the estate stretches into the Jonkershoek Valley to the Hottentots-Holland Catchment Area and, to the south-east, the Assegaaibosch Nature Reserve which was once the Assegaaibosch Estate, also owned by the founder of Coetzenburg, Dirk Coetsee.

== History ==
In the early 1680s, Simon van der Stel, the Dutch Governor of the Cape Colony, granted land to white settlers on the banks of the Eerste and Berg Rivers in and around what would become the towns of Stellenbosch and Franschhoek. The settlers were tasked with cultivating crops and raising livestock to supply ships of the Dutch East India Company as they rounded the Cape Peninsula en route to trade in the East Indies. In 1682, Simon van der Stel granted land at the foot of the Stellenbosch Mountain to the captain of the Stellenbosch Infantry and progenitor of the Coetsee family in South Africa, Dirk Coetsee, who established one of the oldest wine estates in South Africa, Coetzenburg, on the land. Coetsee built the Coetzenburg Manor House which is now a national monument not open to the public. In the same year, Van Der Stel promised land higher up in the Jonkershoek Valley to Dirk Coetsee. Coetsee named this land Assegaaibosch (due to the abundance of assegai trees; Assegaaibosch means "Assegai forest") and used it primarily for grazing. Coetsee later built the Assegaaibosch Manor House, a traditional Cape Dutch-styled house, which is now a national monument. Van der Stel also granted two other estates to Dirk Coetsee: Uiterwyk (“Outer ward”) in Bottelary in 1699, and Zonquasdrift (from “Zonqua” which means San and drift in Dutch) in Tulbagh in 1714.

== Past owners ==
Past owners of Coetzenburg, apart from the founder Dirk Coetsee and his son Gerrit Coetsee, include Andries Christoffel Van Der Byl and Johannes Henoch "Jannie" Marais.

Andries Christoffel van der Byl of the prominent Van Der Byl family, which were interrelated with the Coetsee family and owned wine estates like Groot Constantia, Groote Schuur, Schoongezicht (now Lanzerac) and currently the Irene Estate in Pretoria (amongst others), was born in 1825, the son of PG van der Byl. He married twice: in 1847 to Gezina Wilhelmina Constantia Marais, the daughter of Charles Gerhardus Marais of the wine estate Old Nectar in the Jonkershoek Valley (one child 1848); married again in 1869 Sara Christina Munnik Cloete.

Jannie Marais was the grandson of Charles Gerhardus Marais. He was born on Coetzenburg in 1851. In 1880, along with his brothers he combined several mining companies to establish the Kimberley Central Mining Company which later merged with De Beers Consolidated Mines. He was a member of the Cape parliament from 1899 till his death. He owned the Lion Distillery (now Van Rhyn's Distillery) on Vlottenburg Estate and the Malmesbury Voogdy en Assuransiemaatskappy. In 1915, he co-founded Naspers and established Die Burger newspaper. He bequeathed £100,000 to establish the University of Stellenbosch and a scholarship scheme which continues today.

== See also ==
- Dirk Coetsee, the founder of the Coetzenburg Estate
- Assegaaibosch Estate, also founded by Dirk Coetsee
