= Disa begleyi =

Scientific classification
- Kingdom: Plantae
- Clade: Tracheophytes
- Clade: Angiosperms
- Clade: Monocots
- Order: Asparagales
- Family: Orchidaceae
- Subfamily: Orchidoideae
- Genus: Disa
- Species: D. begleyi

Binomial name
- Disa begleyi L.Bolus

Species of flowering plant

Disa begleyi is a perennial plant and geophyte belonging to the genus Disa and is part of the fynbos. The species is endemic to the Western Cape and occurs at Jonkershoek and Elgin. The plant has a distribution area of less than 500 km2 and grows on open slopes at approximately 1 200 m above sea level. The plant is considered rare.
