= Jan Marais statue =

Statue at Stellenbosch University

The Jan Marais statue
- Artist: Coert Steynberg
- Year: 1950
- Subject: Johannes Henoch Marais
- Location: Stellenbosch; 33.932887°S 18.8638513°E

The Jan Marais statue is situated in Stellenbosch, South Africa, and is located on the Rooiplein within the Stellenbosch University's campus.

== History ==
The Jan Marais statue was sculpted by Coert Steynberg and erected in 1950.

== Background ==
Philanthropist Johannes Henoch Marais, also known as Jan Marais, was born in Stellenbosch on 8 September 1851. In 1870, he set out with three of his brothers to pursue his fortune on the diamond fields near the Vaal and Orange Rivers. This led to them becoming major shareholders in the company De Beers Consolidated Diamond Mines. Jan Marais came back to Stellenbosch as a rich man and later went on to buy the Coetzenburg farm from his mother. He soon established himself in a forefront position as a leading figure in Stellenbosch. He became the first representative of Stellenbosch to serve in the House of Assembly and remained a parliamentary member till his death. In 1915, Jan Marais passed away and bequeathed £100 000 (R100 million) towards the establishment of Stellenbosch University. His testament also influenced the founding of the Jan Marais National Fund (HJMNF), which still continuously awards about R20 million every year towards a number of different developmental projects in South Africa in support of the Afrikaans language. In addition, he also funded a considerable sum of money for the start-up of Nasionale Pers (Naspers).

=== Statue ===
Stellenbosch university recognizes the sustainable financial contribution that philanthropist Jan Marais made towards the establishment of the university in 1915, which is the reason for the erection of the statue in 1950. The statue is placed in the centre of the main campus, where a multitude of students from different social and cultural backgrounds continuously walk past it every day.

== Aim for removing the statue ==
=== Decolonisation of universities in South Africa ===
It has been reported that non-white university students still encounter the social structures of colonialism and white privilege on a daily basis. This idea led to the #FeesMustFall campaign that erupted on university campuses throughout South Africa in 2015. The student uprisings were primarily focused on decolonizing higher education institutional structures, granting formally underrepresented populations equal access to higher education, and decolonizing university curricula.

University institutional hierarchies are dominated by white academics. White people only make up 7.8% of the South African population overall, however, 74% of the permanent academic staff at the top South African universities are white. These statistics reveal the cause of the protests in 2015, as research evidence supports that the opportunities for employment are still believed to be only available to those who benefited from colonialism.

=== Protests for removing the statue ===
Statues and other visual symbols can evoke a variety of emotions and feelings in people, especially in a nation with a history of apartheid-related division and difficult circumstances. During the #FeesMustFall movement in 2015, statues at universities such as the Jan Marias statue situated on the Rooiplein in Stellenbosch came under increasing scrutiny. Student groups expressed their displeasure with the Jan Marais statue during the height of the #FeesMustFall movement. This was done by setting fire and throwing clay and sand at the pedestal of the statue. The protest aimed to raise awareness and reflect on the presence of the statues from a colonial past within South African university campuses. The statue of Marais was the target figure as he is regarded as a symbol of white supremacy that looms over the campus and upholds an ongoing legacy of segregation and colonization. The protests never lead to the removal of the statue in 2015 and the statue still remains intact on the Stellenbosch campus.
