= Assegaaibosch Nature Reserve =

Historic estate in the Western Cape, South Africa

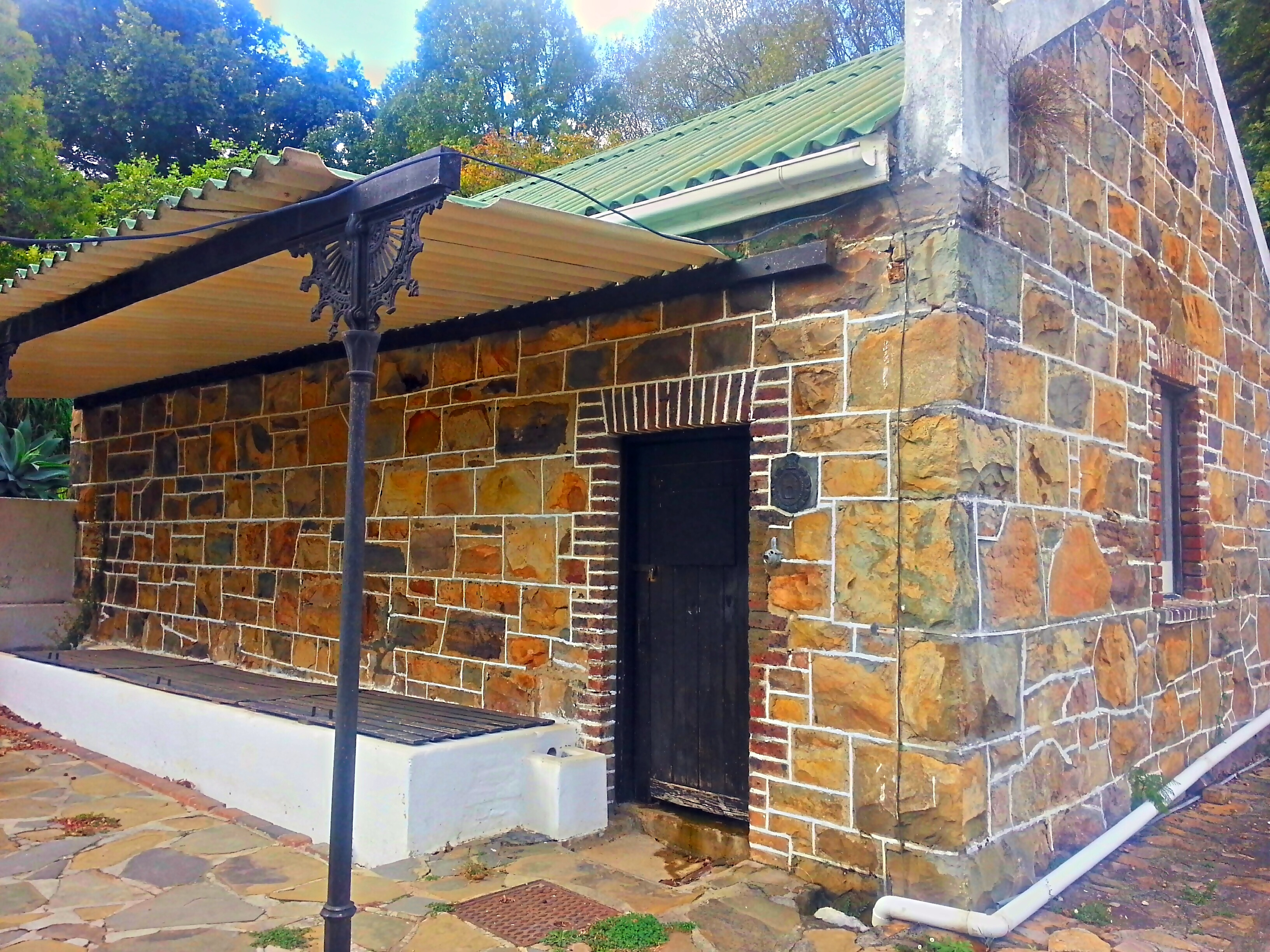
- The trout hatchery in Assegaaibosch

- Location within Western Cape
- Location: Western Cape, South Africa
- Nearest city: Stellenbosch
- Coordinates: 33°58′0″S 18°55′30″E
- Area: 204 ha (500 acres)
- Governing body: CapeNature
- Website: www.capenature.co.za/reserves/assegaaibosch-nature-reserve/

Assegaaibosch Nature Reserve is a historic estate and currently a CapeNature nature reserve and World Heritage Site situated in the Jonkershoek Valley near Stellenbosch in the Western Cape province of South Africa. The historic estate was established by Dirk Coetsee, the progenitor of the Coetsee family in South Africa.

== Name ==
'Assegaaibosch' means 'Forest of Assegaai' in Dutch and Afrikaans, referring to the large number of Assegaai (Curtisia) trees on the estate. An assegaai is a traditional African weapon usually carved from Curtisia wood.

== Location ==
Assegaaibosch is located south-east of Coetsenburg, on the north-eastern slopes of the Stellenbosch Mountain, which forms its southern boundary, in the Jonkershoek Valley stretching down to the banks of the Eerste River which forms its northern boundary below. It is about 9 km (5.6 mi) from Stellenbosch, and 204 ha (500 acres) in size.

== History ==
In the early 1680s, Simon van der Stel, the Dutch Governor of the Cape Colony, granted land to white settlers on the banks of the Eerste and Berg Rivers in and around what would become the towns of Stellenbosch and Franschhoek. The settlers were tasked with cultivating crops and raising livestock to supply ships of the Dutch East India Company as they rounded the Cape Peninsula en route to trade in the East Indies. In 1682, Simon van der Stel granted land at the foot of the Stellenbosch Mountain to the captain of the Stellenbosch Infantry, Dirk Coetsee, who established one of the oldest wine estates in South Africa, Coetsenburg, on the land. In the same year, Van Der Stel promised land higher up in the Jonkershoek Valley to Dirk Coetsee. Coetsee named this land Assegaaibosch (due to the abundance of assegaai trees; Assegaaibosch means "Assegai forest") and used it primarily for livestock.

Dirk Coetsee later built the Assegaaibosch Manor House, a traditional Cape Dutch-styled house, which is now a national monument. Though the Coetsee family certainly used the farm since the early 1680s, the only record registers the property in 1755 in the name of Dirk's son, Gerrit Coetsee. Van der Stel also granted two other estates to Coetsee: Uiterwyk (“Outer ward”) in Bottelary in 1699, and Zonquasdrift (from “Zonqua” which means San and drift) in Tulbagh in 1714. Over the years, the farm changed hands a number of times. The huge old oak trees were planted by Wouter Eduard Wium, who was granted the land by Lord Charles Somerset in 1806, with the special provision that he plant oaks in the area. In 1893, the land next to Assegaaibosch was used to establish a trout hatchery.

By the early twentieth century, Assegaaibosch had become quite run down. In 1960, the Cape Provincial Administration purchased Assegaaibosch, and the house was renovated. It is now a national monument and is used as a guest house.

The sturdy stone trout-hatching house also still stands today, although trout is no longer bred here, as it is an exotic species. CapeNature uses the property as a conservation station. The original hatching house is a national monument.

== See also ==
- Dirk Coetsee, the founder of Assegaaibosch Estate
- Coetsenburg, also founded by Dirk Coetsee, in 1682
