= Jannie Marais =

South African mining magnate, politician and philanthropist

Personal details
- Born: Johannes Henoch Marais; 8 September 1851 Coetsenburg Estate, Stellenbosch, Cape Colony
- Died: 30 May 1915 (aged 63) Thermal springs, Montagu, Cape Province
- Resting place: Papegaaiberg, Stellenbosch, South Africa
- Spouse: Elizabeth (Bessie) Johanna Hendrika de Villiers

Johannes Henoch Marais (8 September 1851 – 30 May 1915) was a South African mining magnate, politician and philanthropist who co-founded the multibillion-dollar media conglomerate Naspers and the University of Stellenbosch. He was affectionately known as Jannie in Dutch.

== Early life and career ==
Marais was born on 8 September 1851 on the wine estate Coetsenburg in Stellenbosch, the youngest of ten children. He was educated at the Stellenbosch Gymnasium. In 1870, at the age of 19, he joined 3 of his older brothers who were prospecting for diamonds along the Vaal River. The following year, they went to New Rush, as Kimberley was then known. There, Marais earned a fortune. In 1880, he combined several mining interests to form the Kimberley Central Mining Company in which his brothers also had valuable shares. Later, the mining concern merged with De Beers Consolidated Mines and the brothers gained substantial interests in the company.

Jannie Marais returned to Coetsenburg in 1892 a very rich man. He purchased the estate from his widowed mother and began diversified farming. At the age of 55 he married 38-year-old Elizabeth (Bessie) de Villiers from Paarl. In 1899, he became a member of the Cape parliament and later, when the Union of South Africa was established in 1910, a member of the national parliament. He remained a parliamentary member till his death. Marais also served on various boards such as the Stellenbosch University Hospital and Divisional Council. His business interests also included the Lion Distillery (now Van Ryn's Distillery of Distell Group Limited) on the Vlottenburg estate and the Malmesbury Voogdy-en Assuransiemaatskappy.

== Later career and philanthropy ==
On 12 May 1914, along with sixteen other men, Jannie Marais attended a meeting at Heemstede, the house of the banker Hendrik Bergh in Stellenbosch. At the meeting, they agreed to establish a company which was registered the following year as De Nationale Pers Beperkt (Dutch for the National Press Limited). Soon thereafter, it was renamed in Afrikaans, Die Nasionale Pers Beperkt, and in 1998, Naspers which is an abbreviation of Die Nasionale Pers Beperkt. Jannie Marais put up most of its funding. Their purpose was to create a publishing and printing company: "For the free unimpeded expression of public opinion on all major issues in our country; the commercial and service imperative must complement each other." (Dutch: "Voor de vrije onbelemmerde uiting van die volksmening aangaande alle belangrike vraagstukken in ons land; kommersiële en diensimperatief moet mekaar aanvul.") The company's first project was the establishment of the Afrikaans newspaper Die Burger. Today, Naspers is a broad-based multi-national internet and media group, offering services in more than 130 countries with a market cap of $114 billion.

In 1915, Jannie Marais bequeathed £100,000 (worth about £12 million today) to establish the University of Stellenbosch. On his death in 1915, Marais and his wife had no children. He donated some of his money to Die Instituut vir Dowes en Blindes (English: The Institute for the Deaf and Blind) in Worcester and the Kindersendinghuis (English: Orphanage) in Cape Town. The rest of his estate established Het Jan Marais Nationale Fonds (English: The Jan Marais National Fund), a scholarship trust which continues to support thousands of students. Jannie Marais died on 30 May 1915 at the hot springs of Montagu. He is buried on the summit of the Papegaaiberg in Stellenbosch.

== See also ==
- Jan Marais statue
