= Stellenbosch Mountain =

Mountain in South Africa

Coordinates: 33°58′11″S 18°54′03″E

Stellenbosch Mountain (Afrikaans: Stellenboschberg or Die Groteberg) is a mountain forming a prominent landmark overlooking the town of Stellenbosch in the Western Cape Province of South Africa. The mountain forms part of the Coetsenburg Estate, the Jonkershoek Nature Reserve, the Assegaaibosch Nature Reserve and the larger Hottentots-Holland Mountains Catchment Area.

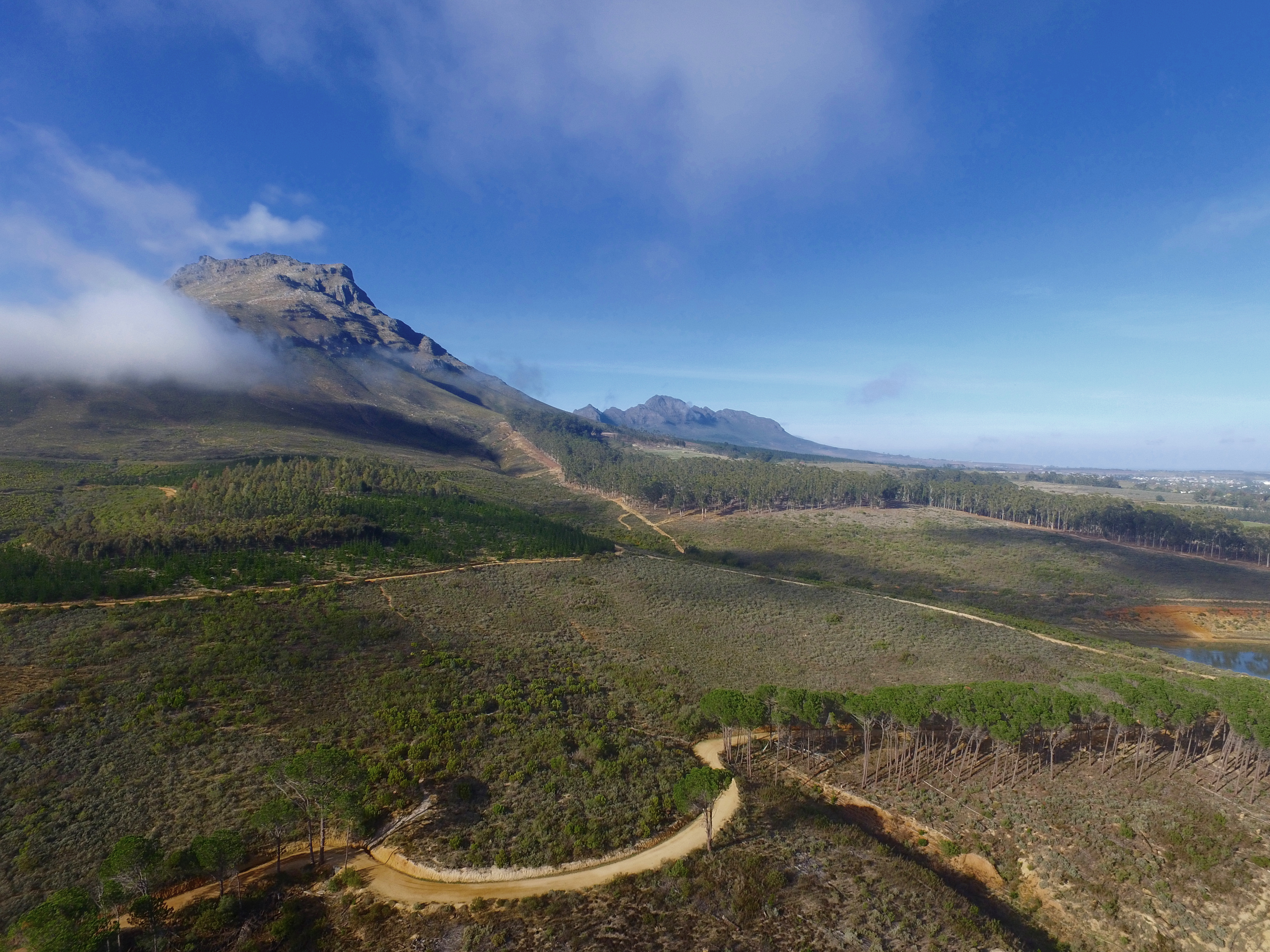
An eastern view of Stellenbosch Mountain

== Geology ==
The peak of Stellenbosch Mountain is 1,156m. The source of the Blaauwklippen (Blouklip) River is near the peak. The range is primarily composed of Table Mountain Sandstone. The climate is typically Mediterranean; warm and temperate, classified as Csb by the Köppen-Geiger system. However, it is generally much cooler and more verdant than other areas in the Western Cape, with annual precipitation at 802mm in the lowlands. There is a strong orographic gradient and annual precipitation on the peaks can reach to more than 3000mm annually. The area has an average temperature of 16.4 °C. In winter, there is much more rainfall than in summer. Snow is not unusual on the peak during winter. The Hottentots Holland Mountains, of which the Stellenbosch Mountain is a peak, are considered the hub of the Cape floristic region with the most biodiversity in the entire fynbos biome. The surrounding lowlands have rich alluvial soils supporting viticulture and other deciduous fruit farms.

== Wildlife ==
The Jonkershoek Mountains, of which Stellenbosch Mountain is a peak, are home to leopards, caracals, klipspringer, Chacma baboons, honey badgers and mongooses, however, all but the baboons are very secretive. Birdlife includes kingfishers, black eagles, African fish eagles, spotted eagle owls, sugarbirds, orange-breasted sunbirds and protea seedeaters. Venomous snakes include the Cape cobra, puff adder, berg adder, boomslang, rinkhals, and black spitting cobra.

== Coetsenburg Estate ==
Most of the northern and eastern aspects of the Stellenbosch Mountain lie on the Coetsenburg Estate which is not open to the public. The estate, which was founded by Dirk Coetsee in 1682, is owned by the influential Anglo-Huguenot Coetsee family.

== Painting ==
A famous painting of Stellenbosch Mountain, titled "Stellenbosberg" (sic) by Jacobus Hendrik Pierneef (1886-1957) sold at auction by Strauss & Co. auctioneers for 612,700ZAR
