= Johannes Elison =

Dutch cleric painted by Rembrandt (1581–1639)

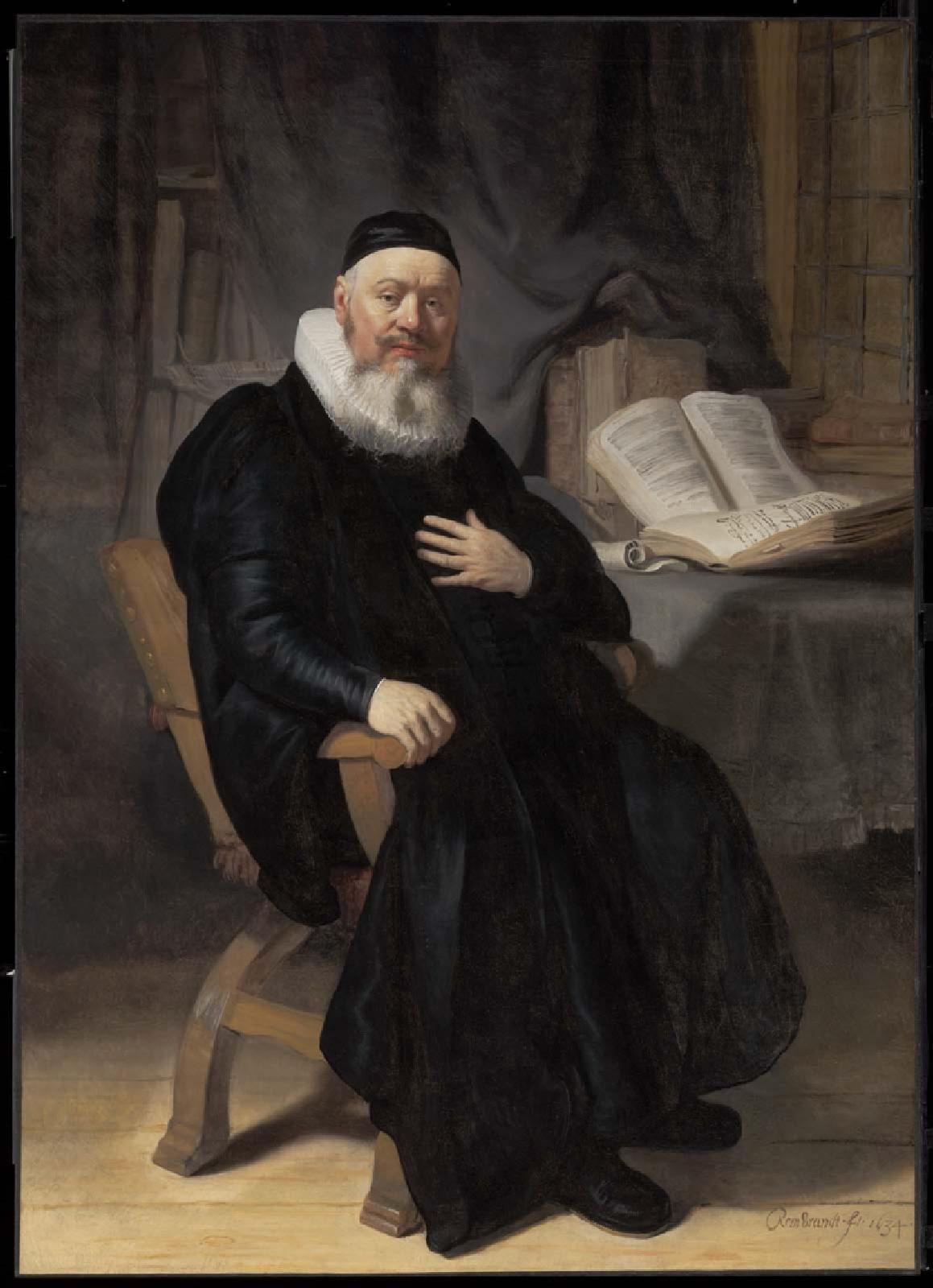
- Elison painted by Rembrandt in 1634
- Born: 11 April 1581; Amsterdam, Netherlands
- Died: 19 August 1639 (aged 58); Norwich, England
- Resting place: Amsterdam, Netherlands
- Other names: John Elison
- Occupation: Reverend
- Organization: Dutch Reformed Church
- Known for: Being painted by Rembrandt
- Spouse: Maijken (Mary) Bockenolle (m. before 1606)
- Children: 7, including Johannes Elison the Younger

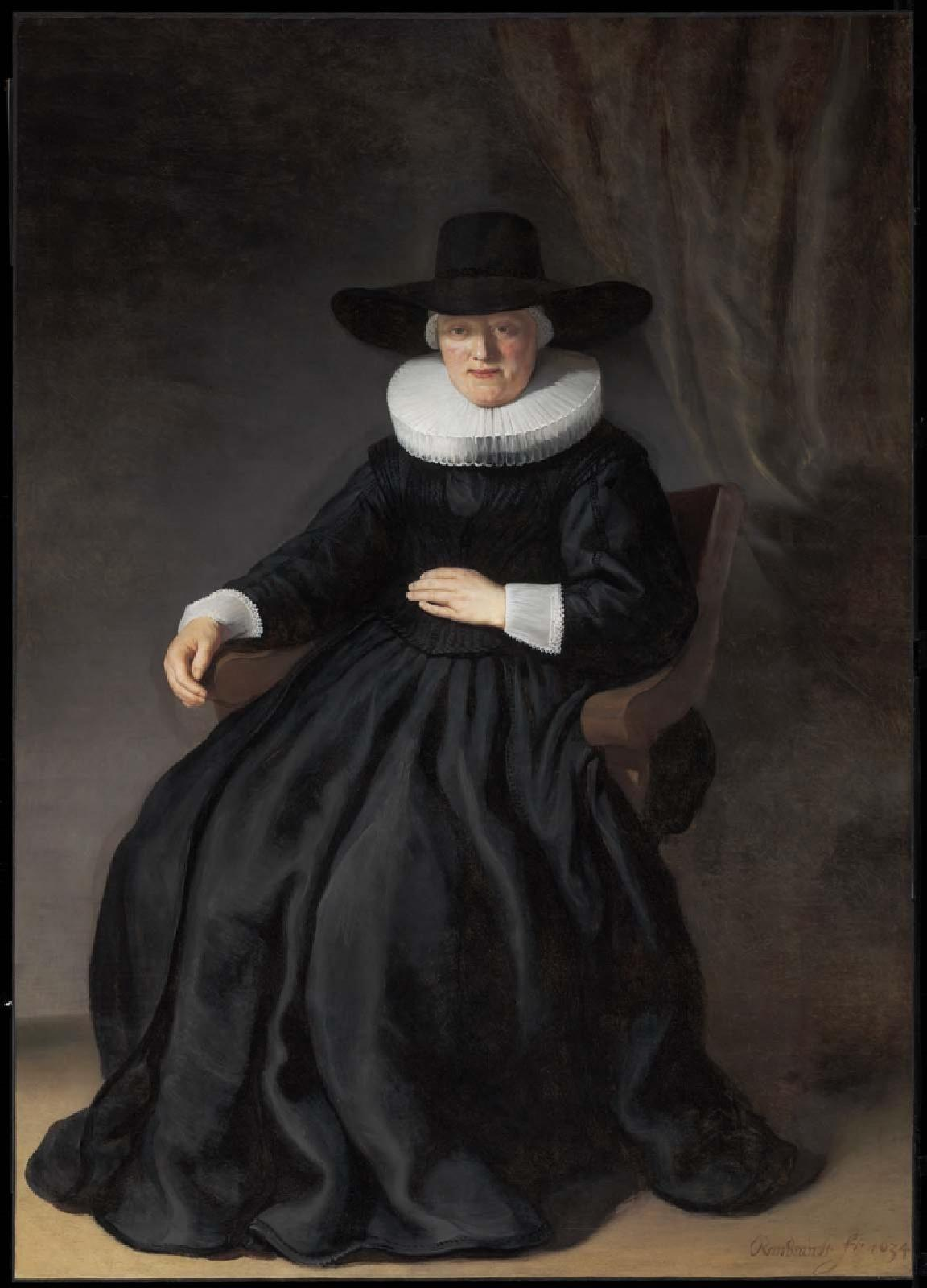
Johannes' wife, Maria (Maijken or Mary).

Johannes Elison (11 April 1581, Amsterdam, Holland – 19 August 1639, Norwich, Norfolk, England) was a Dutch Reverend who was painted by Rembrandt Van Rijn in 1634. He enrolled in Leiden University at the age of seventeen in 1598. He was the minister of the Dutch Reformed Church in Norfolk, England. The portrait by Rembrandt was likely commissioned by Elison's son, Johannes Elison Jr., who was a wealthy merchant in Norwich.
