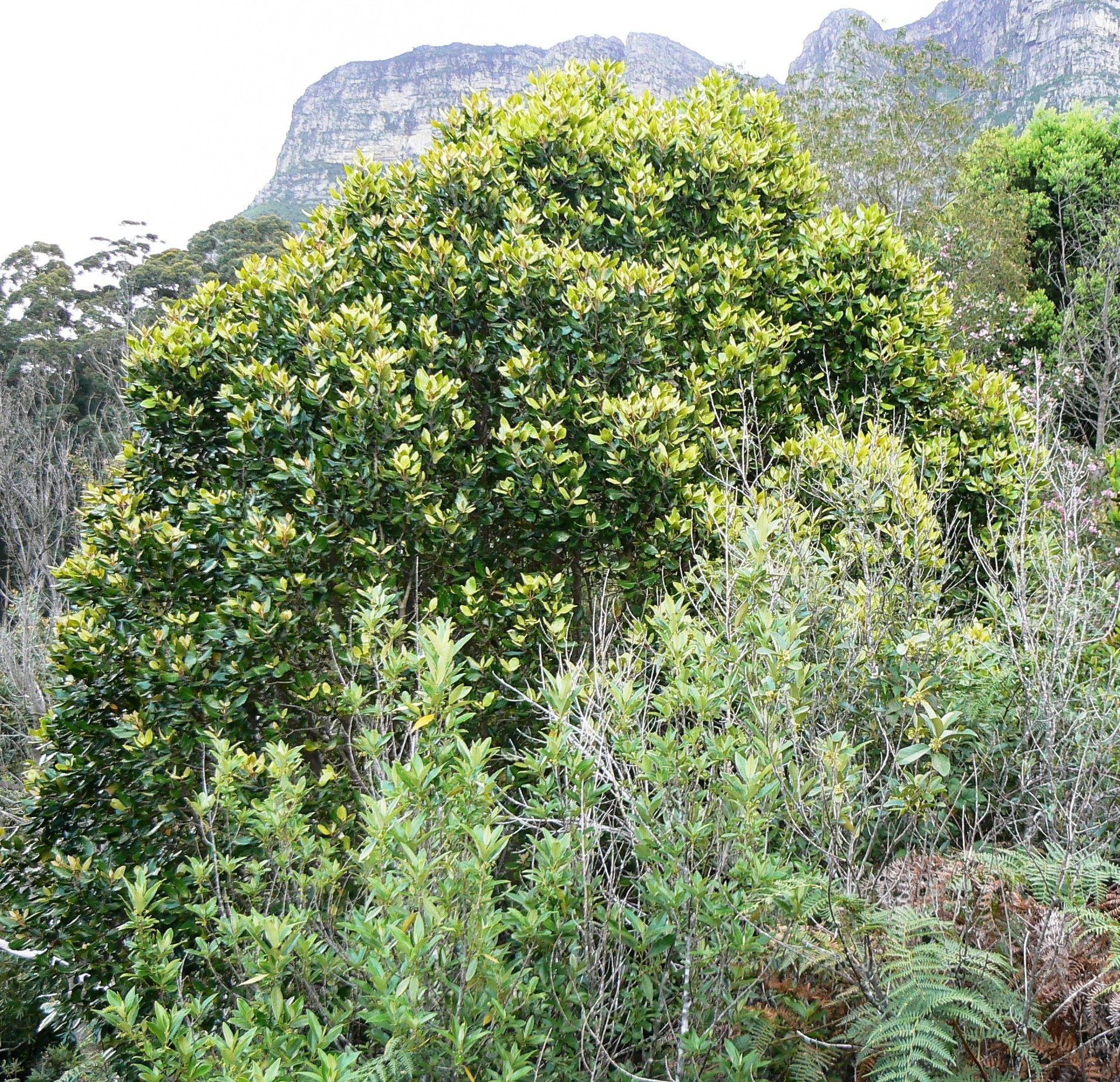

Conservation status
- Near Threatened (IUCN 3.1)

Scientific classification
- Kingdom: Plantae
- Clade: Embryophytes
- Clade: Tracheophytes
- Clade: Spermatophytes
- Clade: Angiosperms
- Clade: Eudicots
- Clade: Asterids
- Order: Cornales
- Family: Curtisiaceae; Takht.
- Genus: Curtisia; Aiton
- Species: C. dentata

Binomial name
- Curtisia dentata (Burm.f.) C.A.Sm.

= Curtisia =

Genus of trees

Curtisia dentata (commonly known as the Assegai tree or Cape lancewood, Afrikaans: Assegaai, Xhosa: Umgxina, Zulu: Umagunda) is a flowering tree from Southern Africa. It is the sole species in genus Curtisia, which was originally classed as a type of "dogwood" (Cornaceae), but is now placed in its own unique family Curtisiaceae.

It is increasingly popular as an ornamental tree for gardens, with dark glossy foliage and sprays of pure white berries. The bark of this tree is a very popular component of traditional African medicine, leading to overexploitation and a decline in the species in some areas of South Africa. The tree is protected in South Africa.

== Name ==
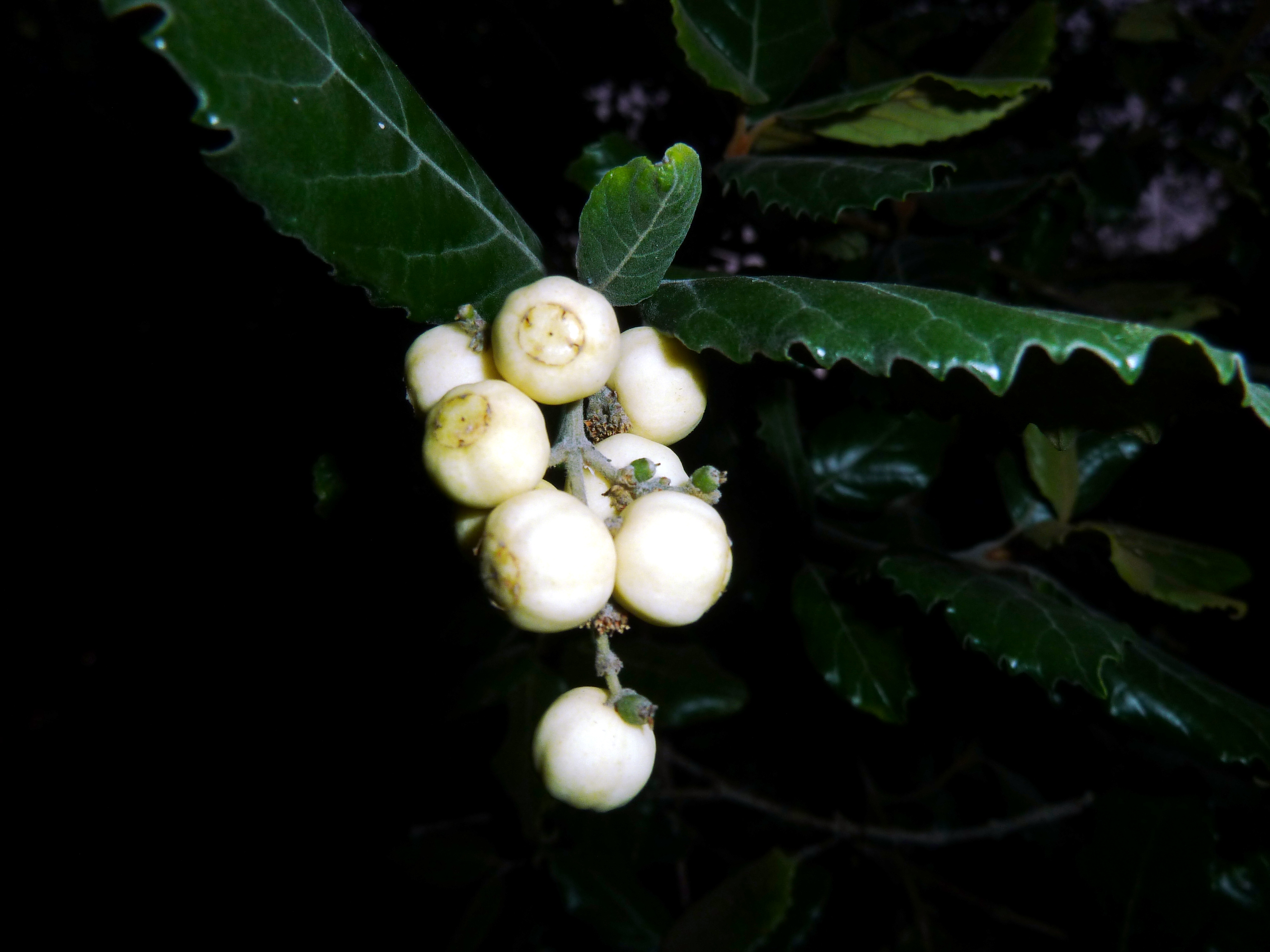
Curtisia fruits

This tree gets its common name from the African spear – the Zulu Assegai – which was traditionally made from this tree's strong wood. The Zulu would intentionally damage the tree's main trunk, causing the tree to coppice from its base. The straight, strong shoots of the coppice were used for the shafts of the spears.

Its genus name, "Curtisia", is from the botanist William Curtis (founder of The Botanical Magazine) and "dentata" is simply the Latin for "toothed", referring to the slightly serrated margins of its leaves.

== Appearance ==
A medium to tall evergreen tree (up to 15 m (49 ft) in height), usually immediately recognizable due to the striking contrast between its dark, glossy foliage and its sprays of cream-white berries. It has a clean, unbuttressed bole and the bark is smooth and grey or cinnamon-coloured. The leaves have pointed tips and toothed edges, and are arranged in opposite pairs. The leaf surface is smooth and dark glossy green, while the stalks and the twigs are covered in silky reddish hair. Very young growth is also velvety to the touch and bronze-gold in colour. The tiny flowers are cream-coloured and velvety, but relatively inconspicuous.

The tree bears dense clusters of small, white berries. They generally appear in winter and are pure white (sometimes tinged with pink or red). They remain on the tree for a long time and can be very decorative.

== Distribution ==
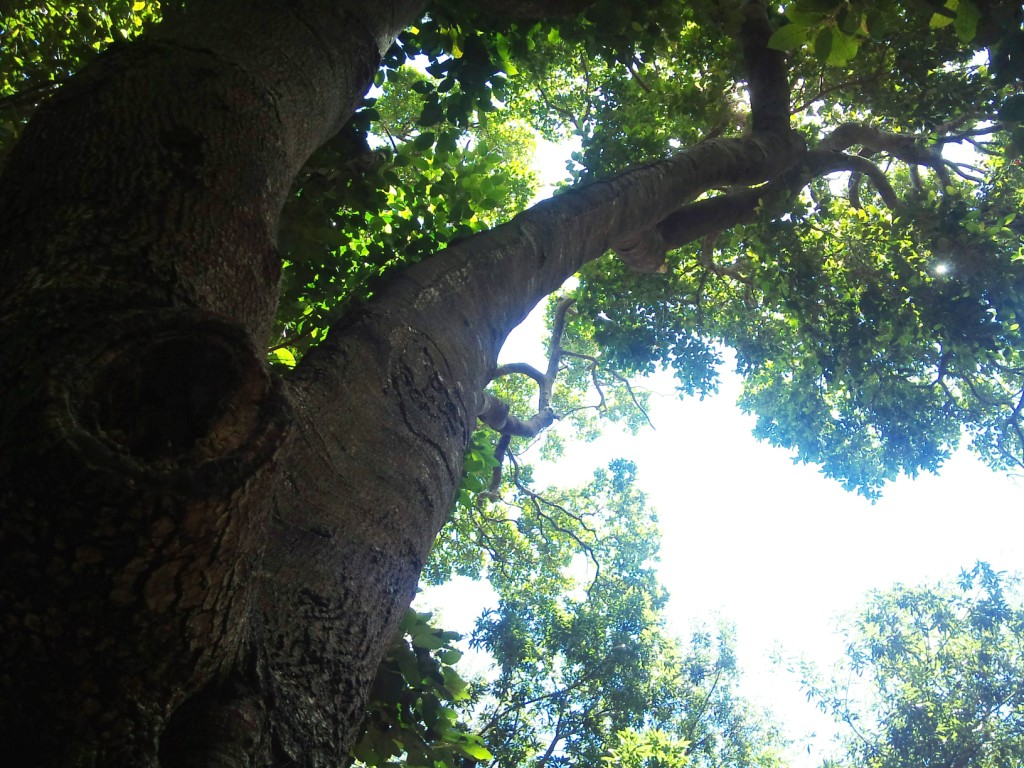
Large Assegai tree, growing wild in Cape forests

The Assegai tree grows in the forests of South Africa and Eswatini, ranging from sea level to 1,800 m (5,900 ft) elevation, and from Cape Town in the south to Limpopo province in the north. It also grows in Afromontane forest in the Eastern Highlands along the border of Zimbabwe and Mozambique, and Mount Gorongosa in Mozambique. In deep Afromontane forest it grows into a tall tree, but on open mountain slopes and by the coast it remains a small bushy tree. Curtisia has been in decline in some areas, as its bark is highly valued for traditional medicine. It is now a Protected Tree in South Africa.

== Growing Curtisia dentata ==
The Assegai tree is attractive, fast-growing and hardy. When planted alone, it grows into a shapely, evergreen tree. Planted in a row it makes an attractive, tall, leafy hedge and it grows especially dense and bushy when planted in the sun. However, it can be grown in light shade as well as full sun, and its roots are non-invasive so it can also be planted near to buildings. It does not create much leaf litter, and it is storm-firm due to its deep roots and tough branches. The tree's edible (but bitter) berries also attract birds to the garden.

The bark of this tree is widely used as a traditional medicine for curing stomach ailments and diarrhoea. It is also reputed to be an aphrodisiac. Due to this, the tree is often overexploited and even effectively exterminated from some parts of the country.

The Assegai is best propagated by seed. Remove the fleshing covering of its white berries and plant them in moist soil. Germination takes a few weeks and seedlings grow rapidly, though they should be kept well-watered and out of direct sunlight. It is sensitive to frost and drought, although established trees can survive both.

== Gallery ==
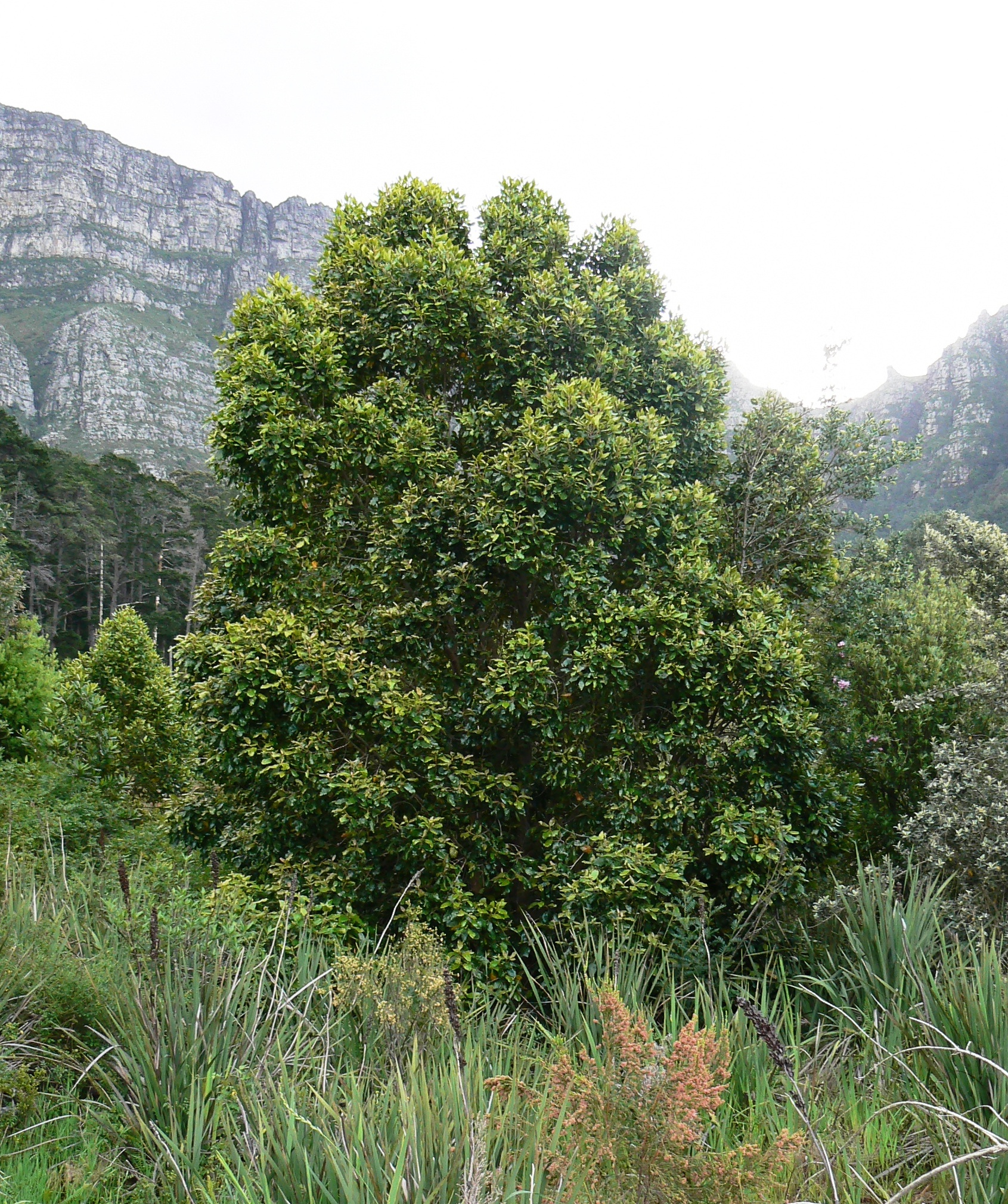
A medium-sized specimen growing in Cape Town.

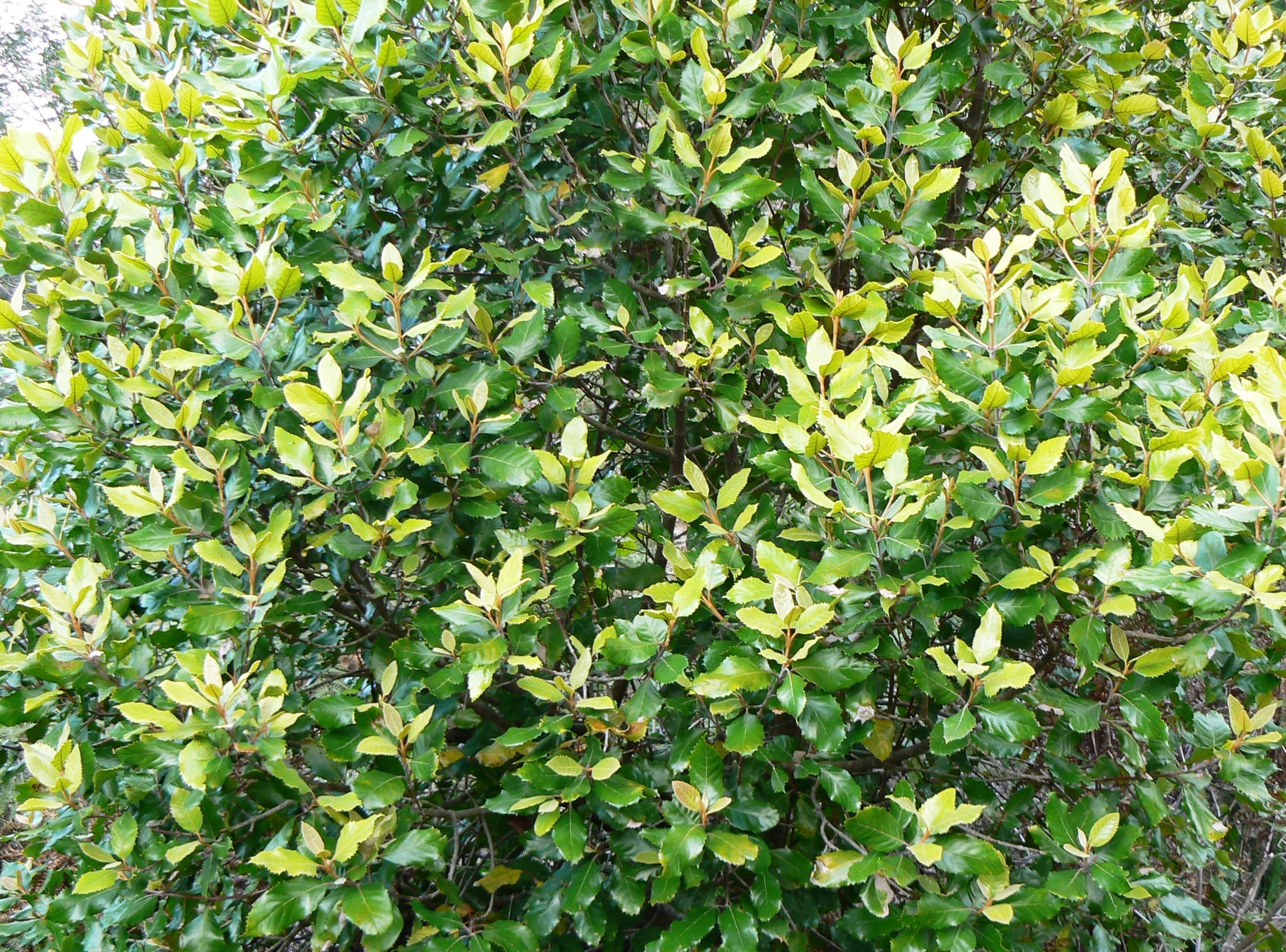
Curtisia dentata makes a good hedge or screen.

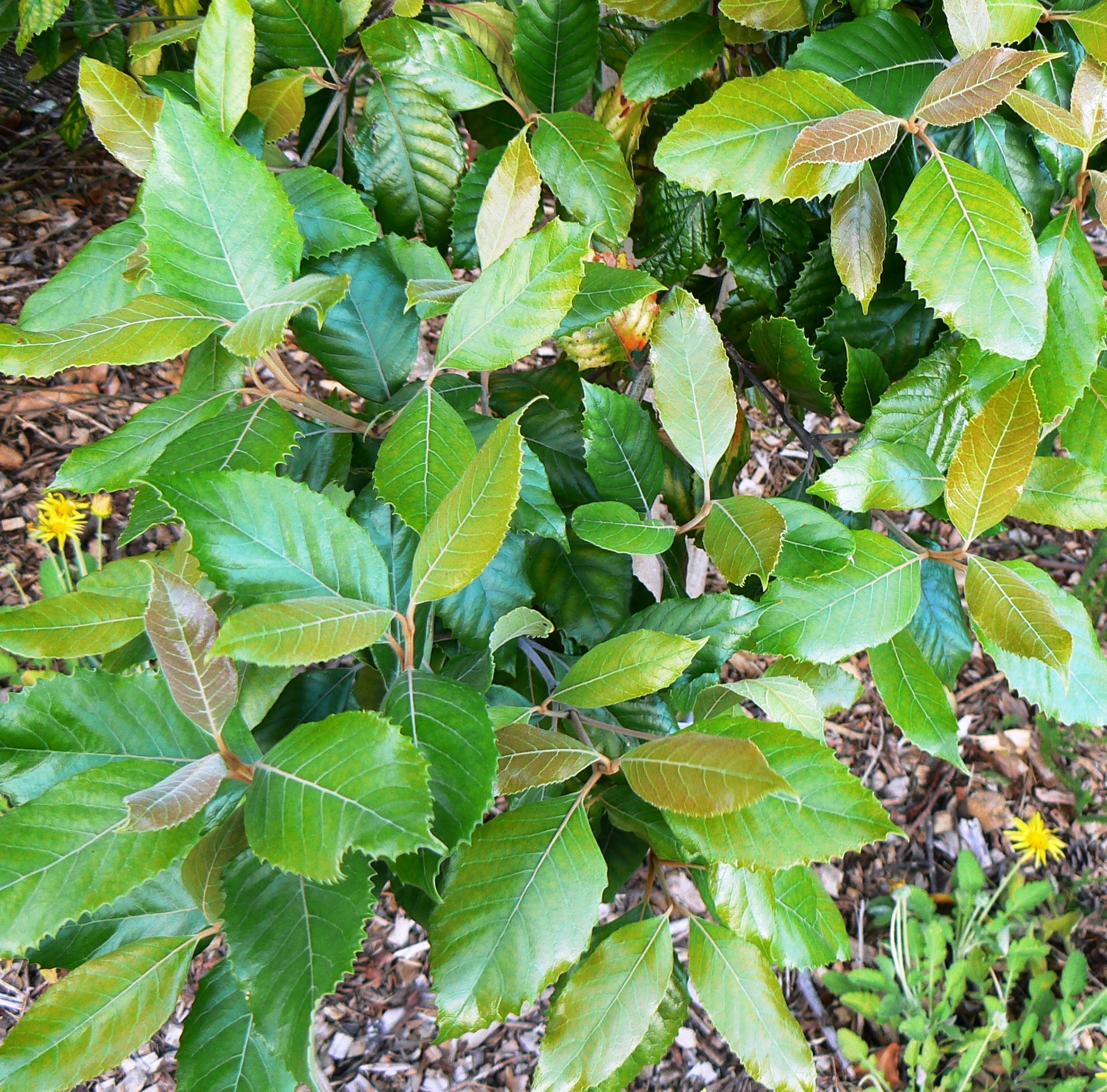
The multi-coloured foliage.

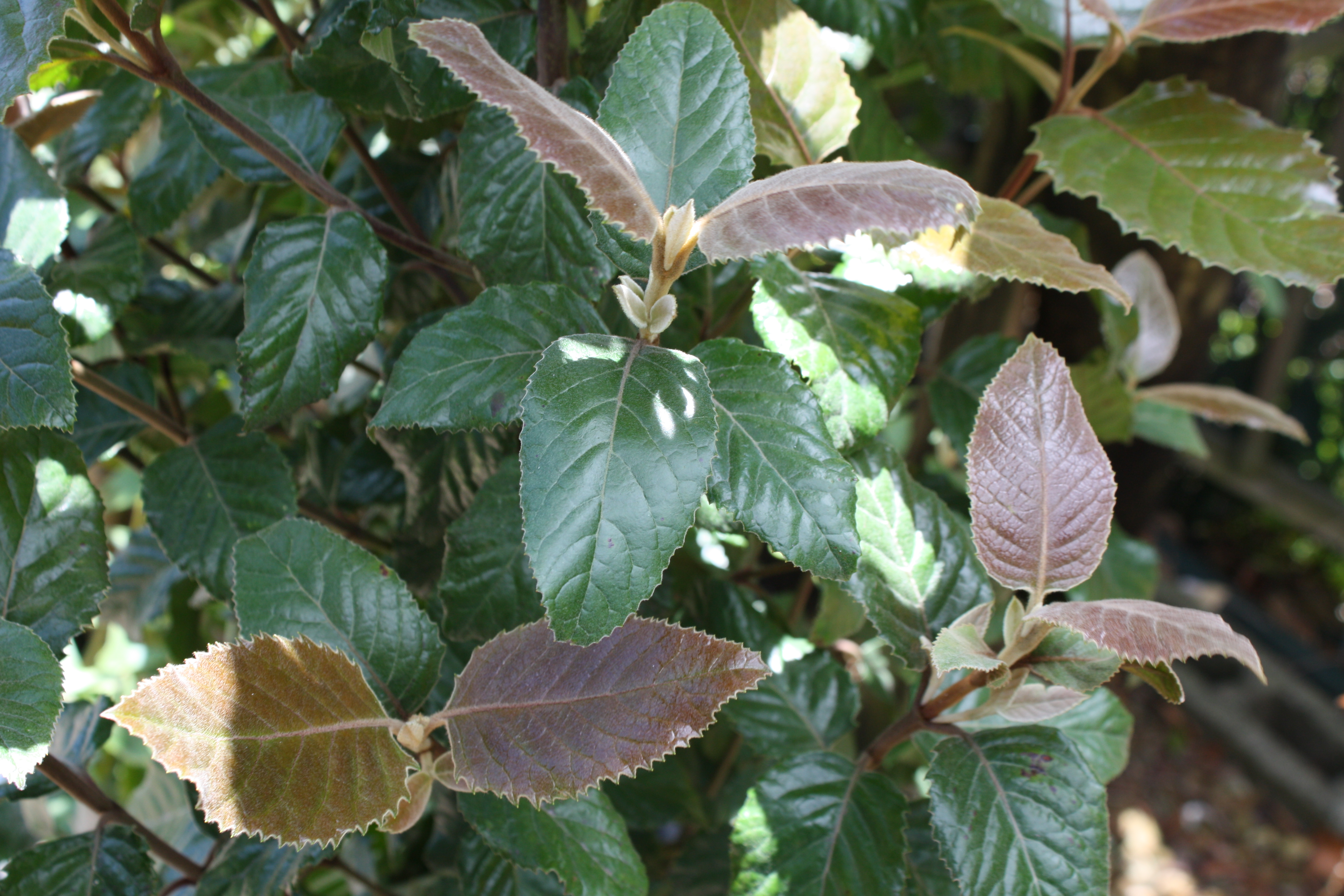
Detail of leaves.

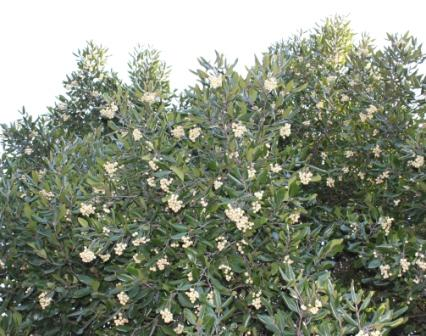
The distinctive white berries

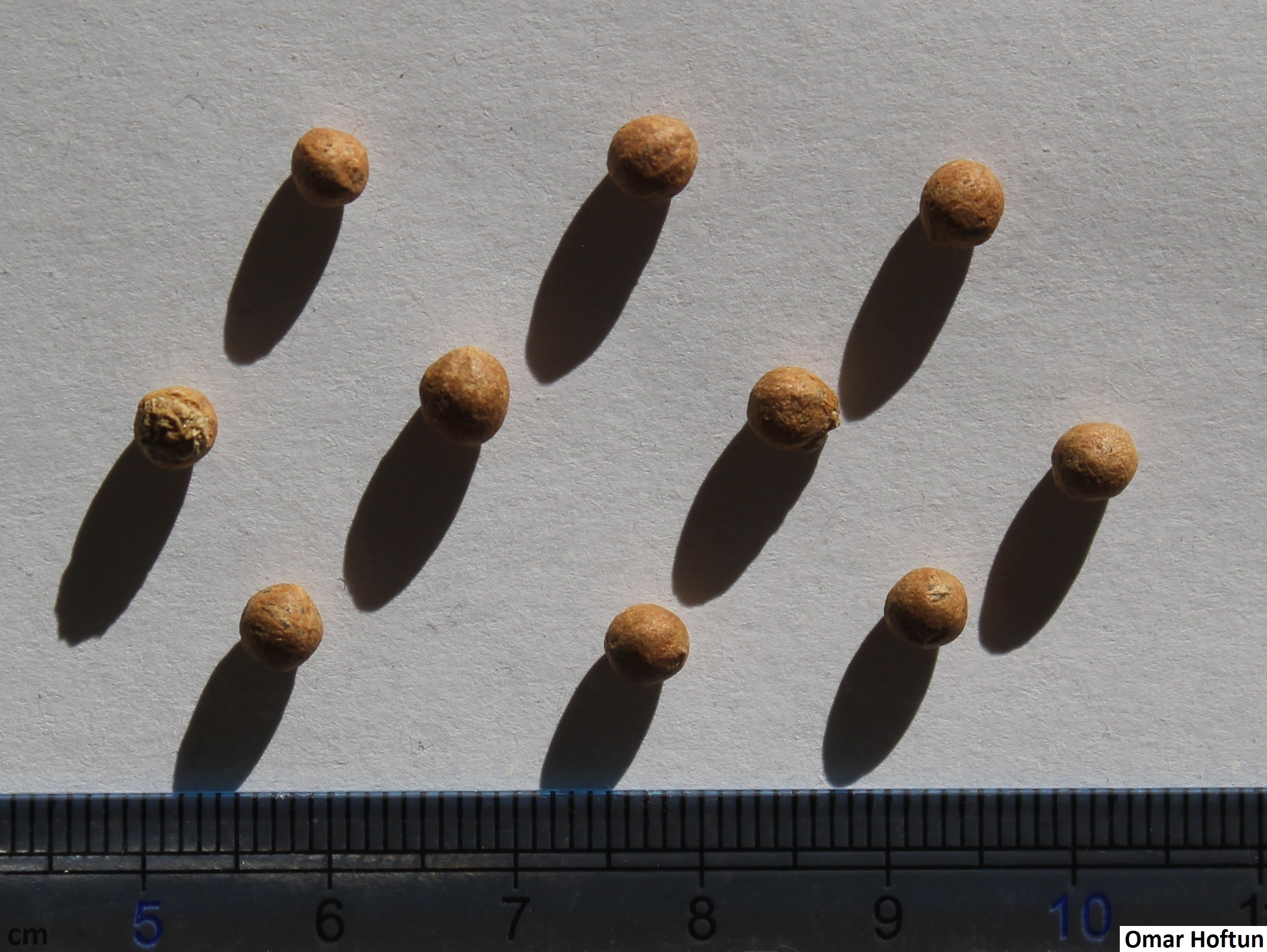
Curtisia dentata seeds.

== See also ==
- List of Southern African indigenous trees
