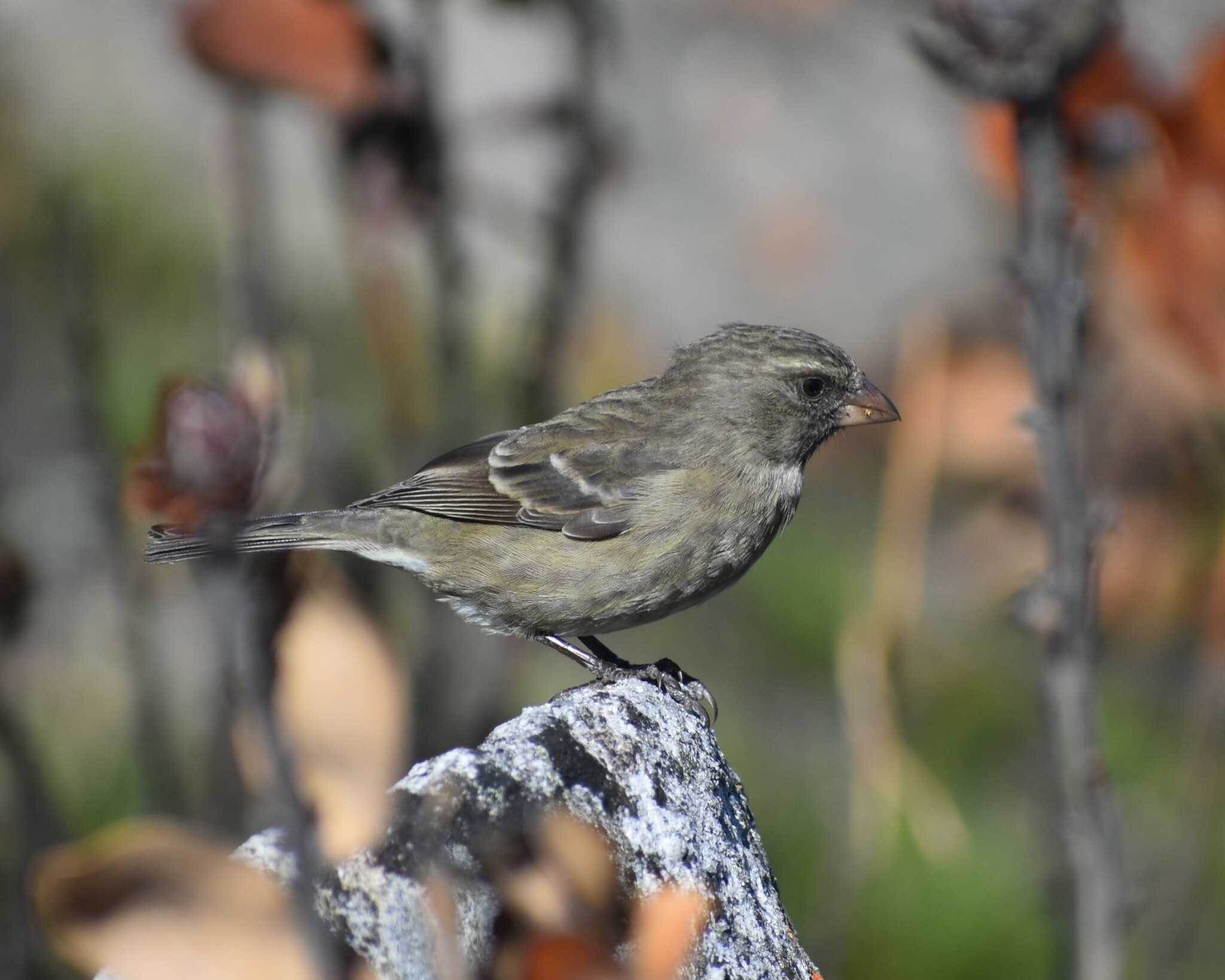

Conservation status
- Near Threatened (IUCN 3.1)

Scientific classification
- Kingdom: Animalia
- Phylum: Chordata
- Class: Aves
- Order: Passeriformes
- Family: Fringillidae
- Subfamily: Carduelinae
- Genus: Crithagra
- Species: C. leucoptera

Binomial name
- Crithagra leucoptera Sharpe, 1871

Synonyms
- Serinus leucopterus

= Protea canary =

Species of bird

The protea canary (Crithagra leucoptera), also known as the protea seedeater, white-winged seedeater or Layard's seedeater, is a small passerine bird in the finch family.

== Taxonomy ==
The protea canary was formerly placed in the genus Serinus but phylogenetic analysis using mitochondrial and nuclear DNA sequences found that the genus was polyphyletic. The genus was therefore split and a number of species including the protea canary were moved to the resurrected genus Crithagra.

== Description ==
The protea canary is 15–16 cm in length with a large pale bill. The adult has grey-brown upperparts, a black chin, white throat and two thin buff wing bars. The underparts are buff with light streaking. The sexes are similar, but young birds are more heavily streaked below than the adults.

The call of the protea canary is a trilled tree-lee-loo or a sweet. The song is a loud medley of warbles and trills, with much mimicry.

== Distribution and habitat ==
It is an endemic resident breeder in the Western Cape Province, South Africa. This species is found in mature protea scrub, tangled valley thickets and forests in the mountains of the Western Cape Province. Its range does not reach the coast.

== Behaviour ==
The protea canary builds an open cup nest from thin stems and other plant material and lined with plant down. It is placed in a dense bush.

The protea canary is less gregarious than other canaries. It tends to be found singly or in pairs, or occasionally in small groups. It is a shy and retiring bird which stays in thick vegetation. When it flies, it soon dives back into cover. It feeds on seeds, (particularly those of proteas, Othonna amplericaules and Rhus anarcardia) and some fruit, nectar and shoots. Insects are occasionally eaten.
