= Jonkershoek Nature Reserve =

Nature reserve in the Western Cape of South Africa

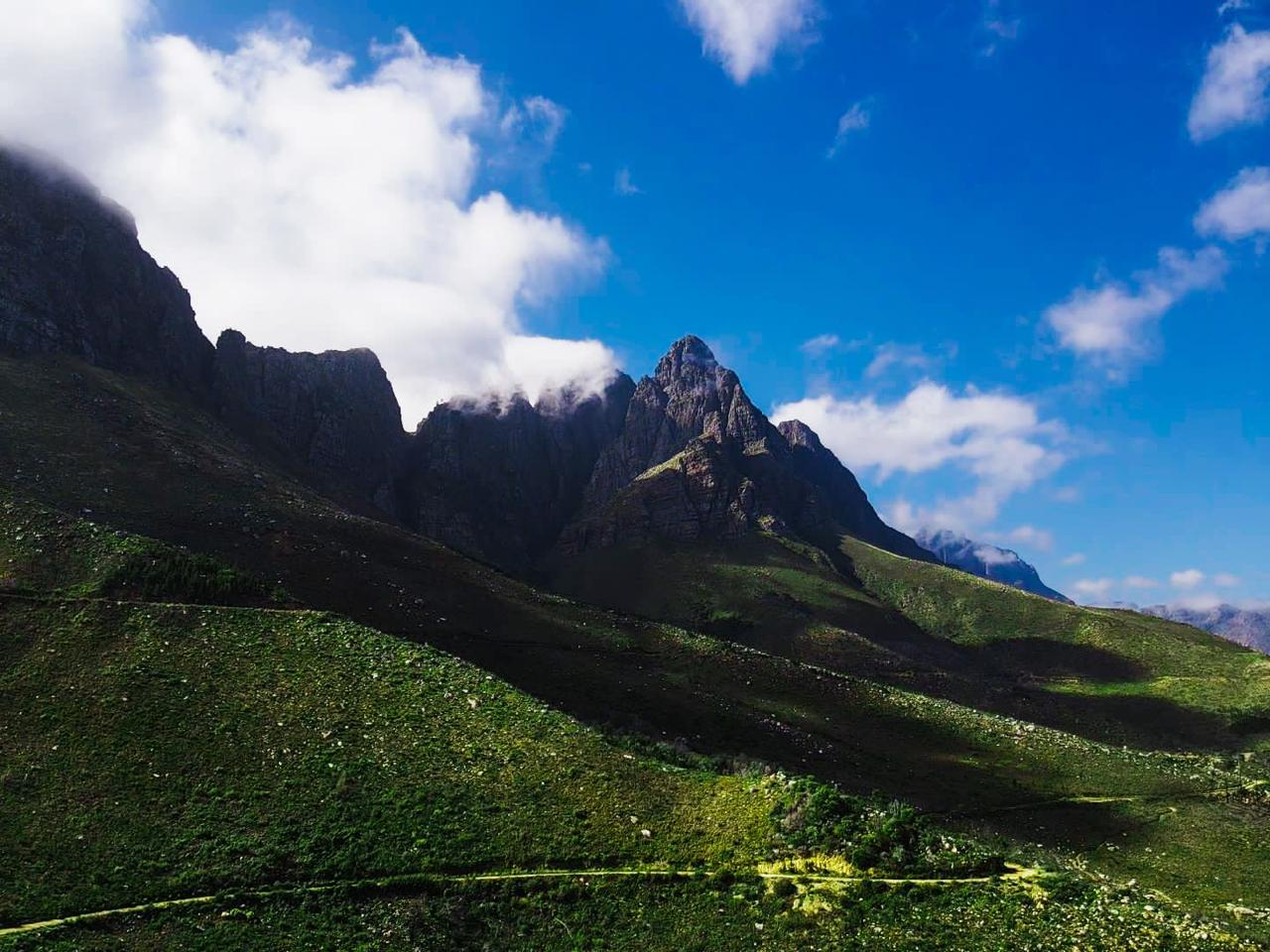
- Jonkershoek Mountain in 2026
- Interactive map of Jonkershoek Nature Reserve
- Location: Western Cape, South Africa
- Nearest city: Stellenbosch
- Coordinates: 33°58′10″S 18°56′10″E
- Area: 11,000 ha (27,000 acres; 110 km^{2}; 42 sq mi)
- Administrator: CapeNature
- Website: Jonkershoek Nature Reserve - CapeNature

Jonkershoek Nature Reserve is a CapeNature nature reserve located approximately 10 km (6 mi) south-east of the town of Stellenbosch in the Western Cape province of South Africa. It covers an area of approximately 11,000 hectares (27,000 acres; 110 km^{2}; 42 sq mi).

== Description ==
The reserve lies north of the Hottentots-Holland Mountains within the Hottentots-Holland Mountain Catchment Area and it contains the smaller Assegaaibosch Nature Reserve. It includes the Jonkershoek Mountains and portions of the upper Jonkershoek valley. The Eerste River and Berg River have their origins in these mountains, the former also flowing through the Jonkershoek valley on its way to False Bay.

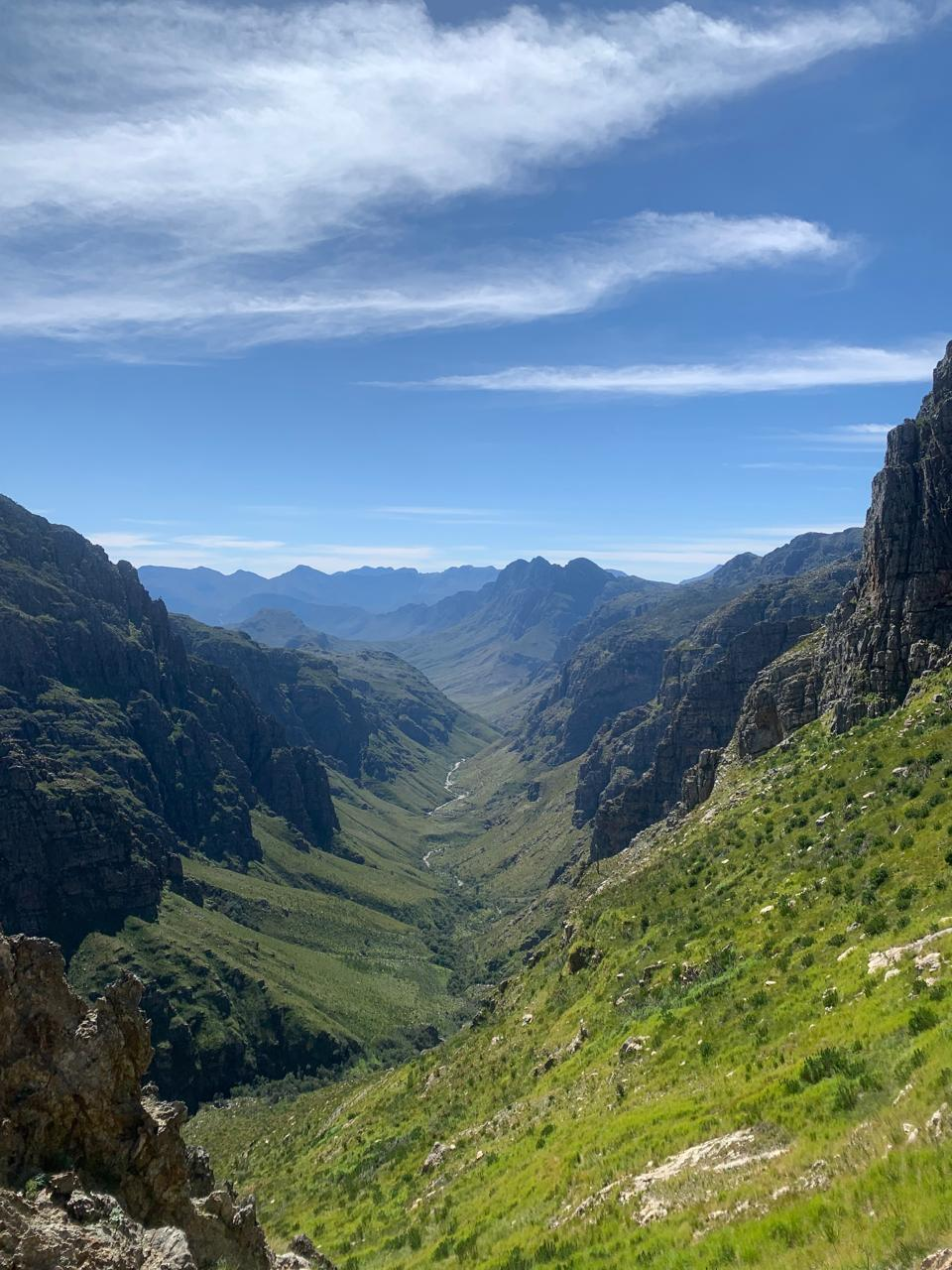
Panorama Route Jonkershoek

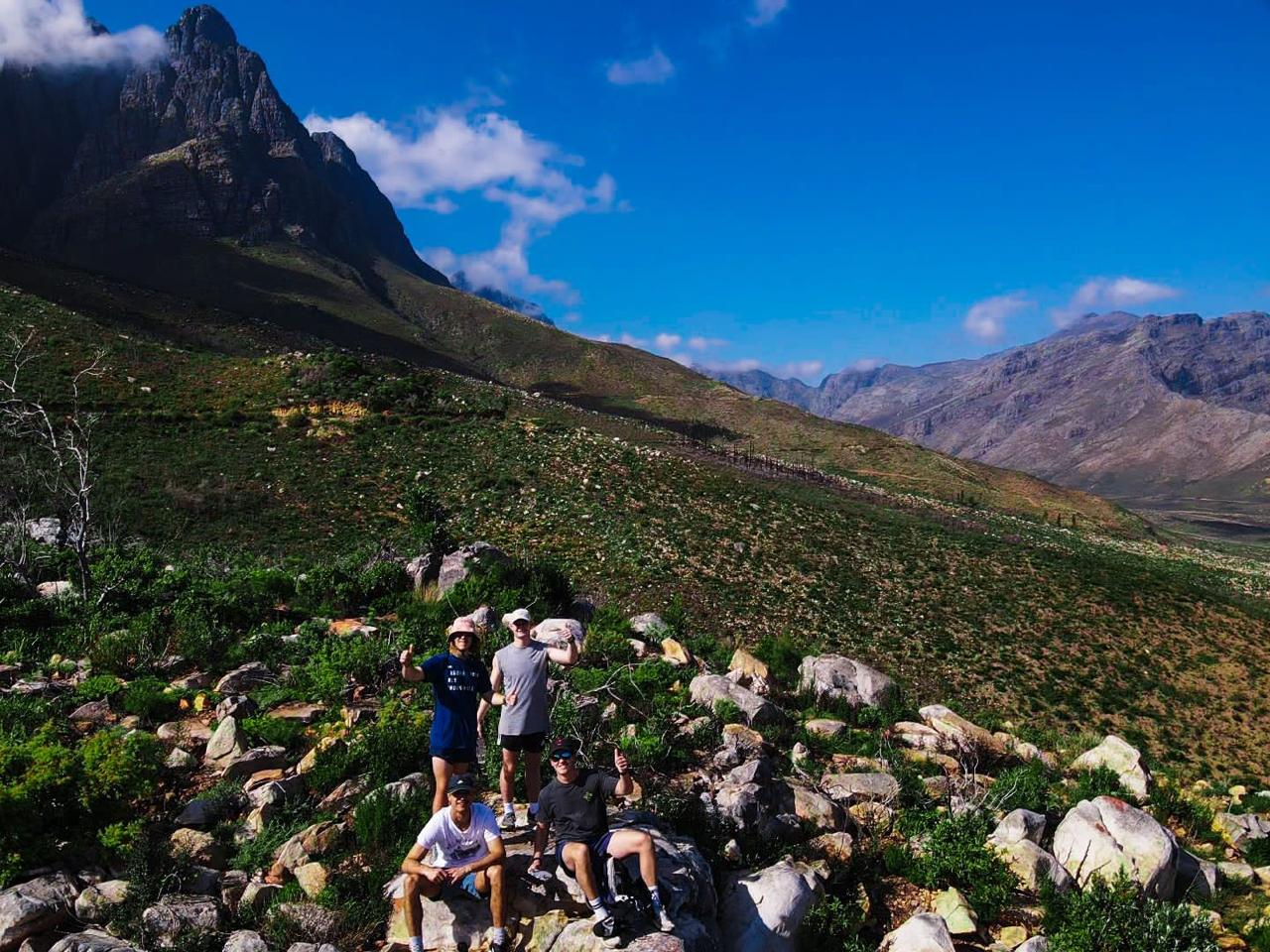
Hikers in Jonkershoek

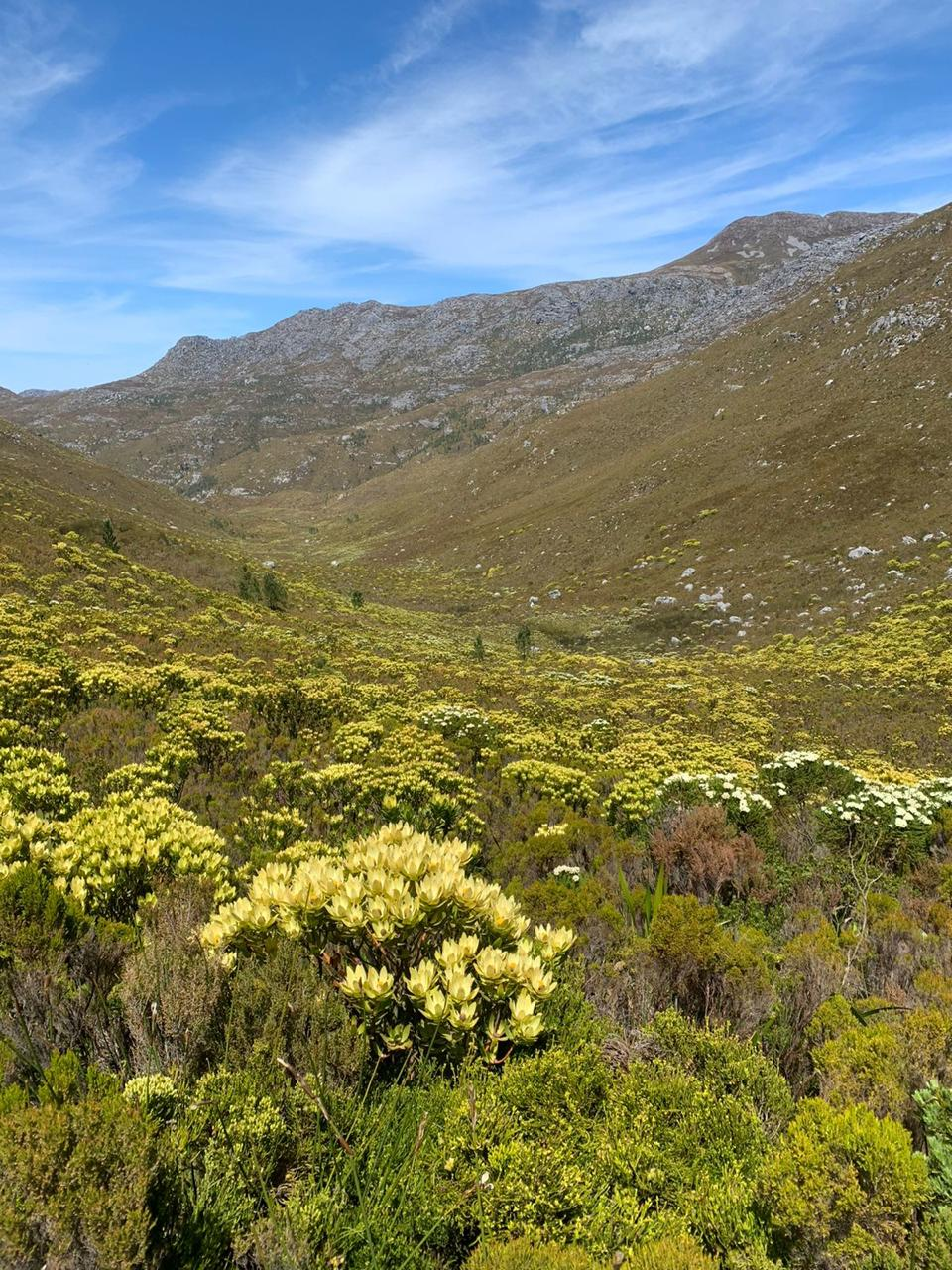
Jonkershoek Fynbos

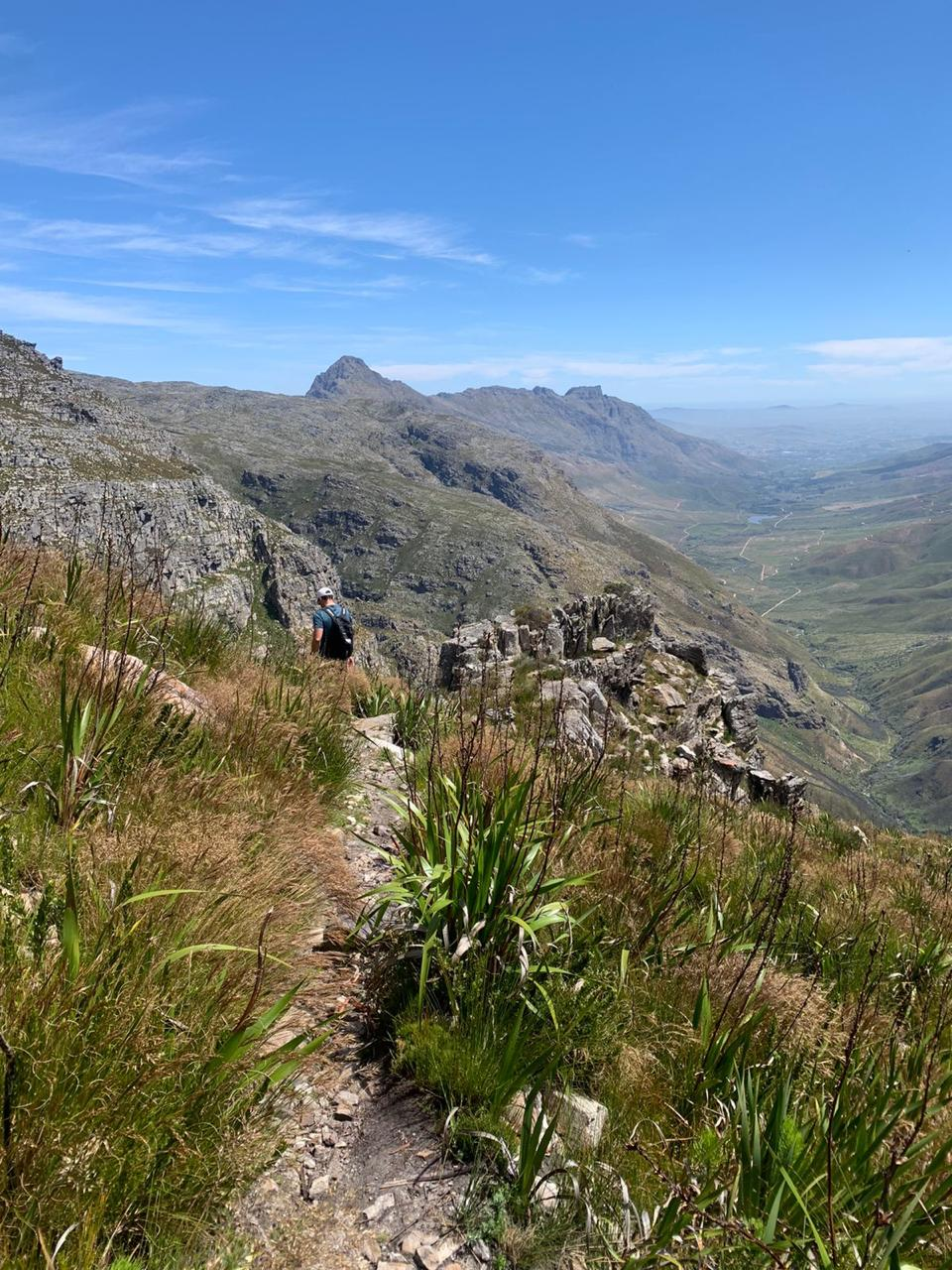
Hiking Jonkershoek

Jonkershoek Images

== History ==
The name Jonkershoek is said to hail from the 17th century owner of one of the freeholds that Simon van der Stel issued in the valley: Jan Andriessen, who had been a bachelor midshipman, was also known as Jan de Jonkheer and named his grant of land Vallei Jonkershoek.

Started as the Assegaaibosch farmstead in 1790, it was subsequently altered substantially by its various occupants. In 1817 Lord Charles Somerset granted the land to Wouter Eduard Wium, with the special proviso that he plant oak trees, and the area now includes many huge oaks.

In 1960 the Cape Provincial Administration purchased Assegaaibosch, and the house was renovated to its present condition. It is now a national monument and is used as a guest house. The Nature Reserve includes many Kramats, including that of Sheikh Sayed Ahmad Singosari Al-Shattari (R.A).

== Wildlife ==
The Jonkershoek mountains are home to leopard, caracal, klipspringer, baboon, honey badger and mongoose, however, all but the baboons are very secretive. Birdlife include kingfisher, black eagle, fish eagle, spotted eagle-owl, sugarbirds, orange-breasted sunbirds and protea seedeaters.

== Access ==
The reserve can be accessed from Stellenbosch via Jonkershoek Road.
