= Eerste River =

River in the Western Cape, South Africa

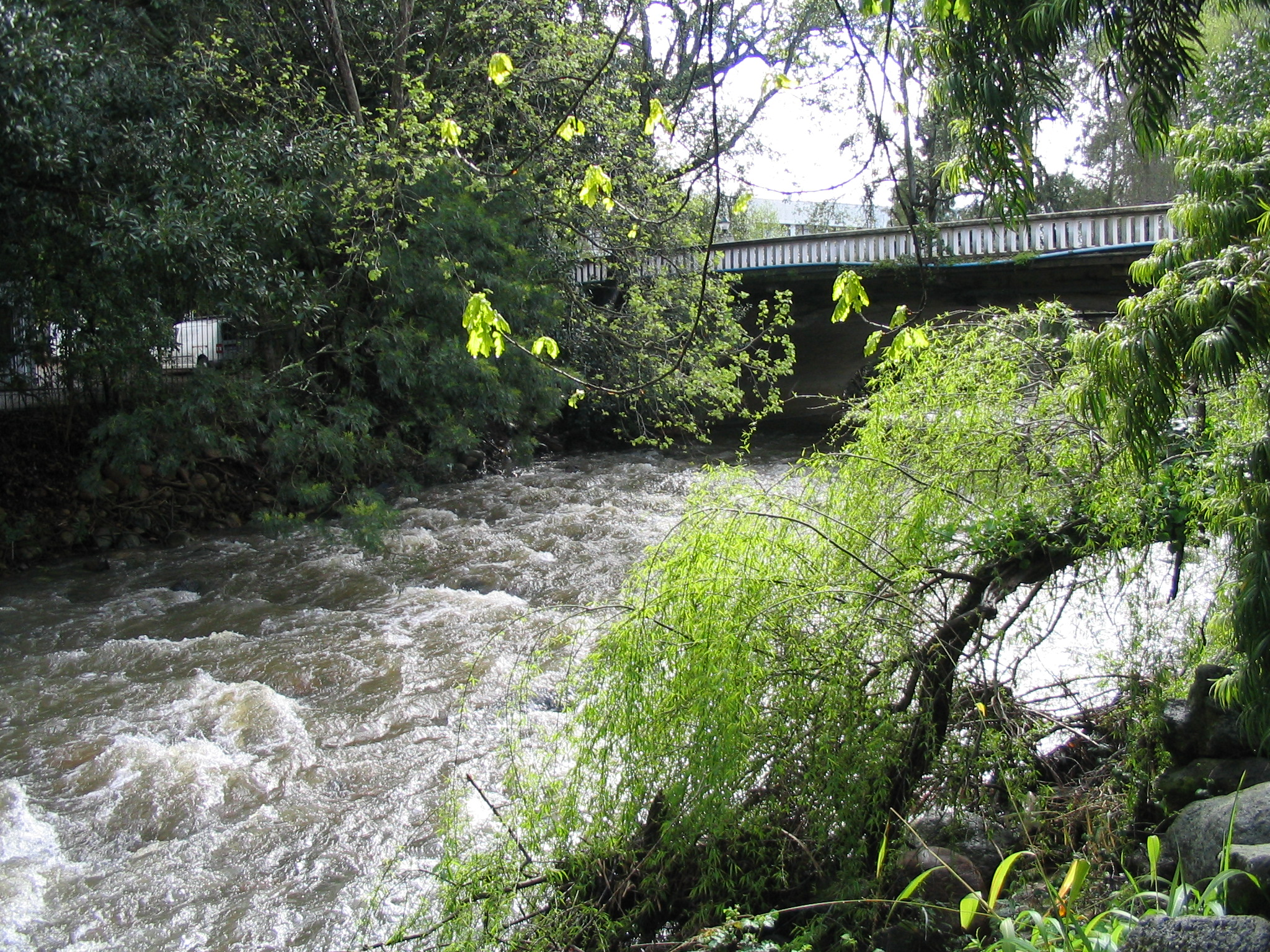
Eerste River in Stellenbosch after heavy rains

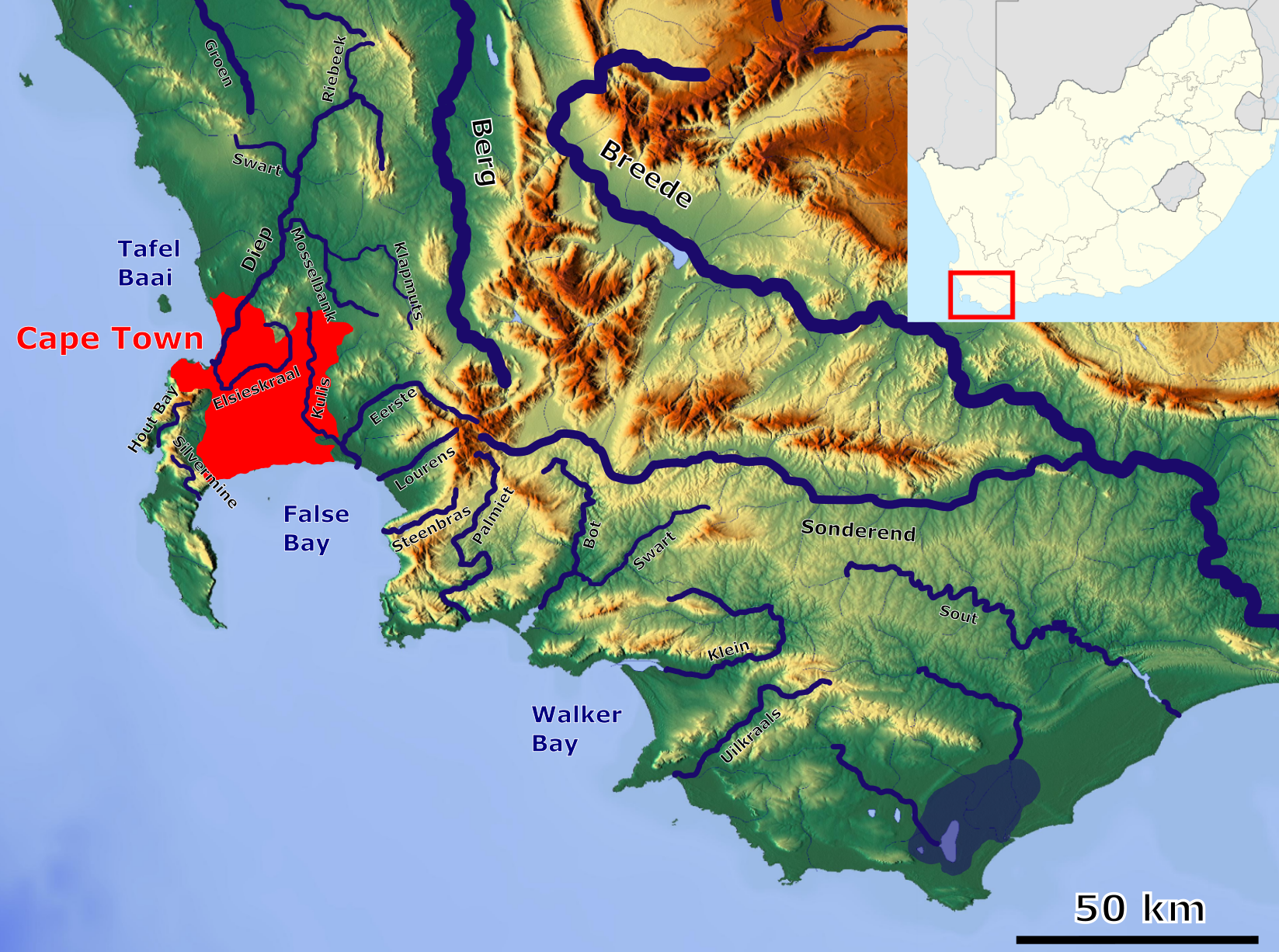
The rivers of the Cape region with the Eerste River (left center)

The Eerste River, located in the Western Cape, South Africa, rises on Dwarsberg 60 km east of Cape Town at the head of Jonkershoek valley. The Eerste River catchment covers the eastern part of the Cape Flats lying to the west of the Hottentots Holland Mountains and south of the Tygerberg where the Kuils River tributary rises east of Kanonkop. The Eerste River is a short river; its length has been given as 40 km. The major tributary, Kuils River, is approximately 30 km long to its point of confluence with the Eerste River.

For a significant part of its course, the river flows through the City of Cape Town.

A population of the endangered local endemic Berg River Redfin (Pseudobarbus burgi) was found in the Eerste River, but may be extinct in this river system.

== Tributaries ==
From "Rivers and Wetlands of Cape Town", ordered from source to sea:

- Jonkershoek River
- Plankenbrug River (R)
  - Klipies River (L)
  - Kromme River (L)
- Veldwachters River (R)
- Sanddrif River (R)
- Blouklip River (L)
- Bonte River (L)
- Kuils River (R)
  - Bottelary River (L)
  - Kleinvlei canal (L)
- Moddergat canal (L)

== Bridges ==
- N2 Highway bridge.
- At the Kramat of Sheik Yusuf in Macassar.

== Estuary and mouth ==
The river mouth is at 34°04.873′S 18°45.887′E, in Macassar, on the north shore of False Bay.

The estuary is at the eastern end of a large calcrete dune, and is part of the boundary of the Helderberg Marine Protected Area. In its natural state the estuary was a small temporarily open system with little tidal flow. The state of the mouth was controlled by river flow, and under natural conditions, seawater intrusion would maintain an estuarine ecology. When the mouth closed, the river would back up past the Kramat to Zandvliet farm.

== See also ==
- List of reservoirs and dams in South Africa
- List of rivers of South Africa
