= List of 2016–17 Super Rugby transfers (South Africa) =

This is a list of player movements for South African Super Rugby teams prior to the end of the 2017 Super Rugby season. Departure and arrivals of all players that were included in a Super Rugby squad for 2016 or 2017 are listed here, regardless of when it occurred. Future-dated transfers are only included if confirmed by the player or his agent, his former team or his new team.

Teams usually name their squads for 2017 – typically containing around 35–40 players – in late 2016 or early 2017. In addition to the main squad, teams can also name additional players that train in backup or development squads for the franchises. These players are denoted by (wider training group) for New Zealand teams, or (extended playing squad) for Australian teams.

== Notes ==
- 2016 players listed are all players that were named in the initial senior squad, or subsequently included in a 23-man match day squad at any game during the season.
- (did not play) denotes that a player did not play at all during one of the two seasons due to injury or non-selection. These players are included to indicate they were contracted to the team.
- (short-term) denotes that a player wasn't initially contracted, but came in during the season. This could either be a club rugby player coming in as injury cover, or a player whose contract had expired at another team (typically in the northern hemisphere).
- Flags are only shown for players moving to or from another country.
- Players may play in several positions, but are listed in only one.

== Transfers ==
=== Bulls ===
Bulls transfers 2016–17
Pos	2016 squad	Out	In	2017 squad
PR	Lizo Gqoboka; Dean Greyling (did not play); Werner Kruger; Nqoba Mxoli; Trevor Nyakane; Pierre Schoeman; Marcel van der Merwe; Hencus van Wyk (short-term)	(substituted off) Dean Greyling (to (France) Oyonnax); (substituted off) Werner Kruger (to (Wales) Scarlets); (substituted off) Nqoba Mxoli (to Blue Bulls); (substituted off) Marcel van der Merwe (to (France) Toulon); (substituted off) Hencus van Wyk (returned to (Japan) Munakata Sanix Blues)	(substituted on) Jacobie Adriaanse (from Southern Kings); (substituted on) Martin Dreyer (from Blue Bulls); (substituted on) John-Roy Jenkinson (from Blue Bulls); (substituted on) Conraad van Vuuren (from Free State Cheetahs)	Jacobie Adriaanse; Martin Dreyer; Lizo Gqoboka; John-Roy Jenkinson; Trevor Nyakane; Pierre Schoeman; Conraad van Vuuren
HK	Bandise Maku; Adriaan Strauss; Callie Visagie (did not play); Jaco Visagie	(substituted off) Bandise Maku (retired); (substituted off) Callie Visagie (released)	(substituted on) Corniel Els (from Blue Bulls); (substituted on) Edgar Marutlulle (from Southern Kings)	Corniel Els (did not play); Edgar Marutlulle; Adriaan Strauss; Jaco Visagie
LK	Grant Hattingh; Irné Herbst (did not play); Nico Janse van Rensburg; Jason Jenkins; Marvin Orie; RG Snyman	(substituted off) Grant Hattingh (to (Japan) Kubota Spears); (substituted off) Irné Herbst (to Southern Kings); (substituted off) Nico Janse van Rensburg (to (France) Montpellier); (substituted off) Marvin Orie (to Lions)	(substituted on) Lood de Jager (from Cheetahs); (substituted on) Abongile Nonkontwana (from Blue Bulls); (substituted on) Hendré Stassen (from Blue Bulls U19); (substituted on) Ruben van Heerden (from Blue Bulls U21)	Lood de Jager; Jason Jenkins; Abongile Nonkontwana; RG Snyman; Hendré Stassen (did not play); Ruben van Heerden
FL	Arno Botha; Nick de Jager; Jannes Kirsten; Lappies Labuschagné; Freddy Ngoza (did not play); Jacques Potgieter (did not play) (Note: Jacques Potgieter was initially included in the Sharks' squad for the 2016 season. However, in May 2016 – prior to making any appearances in the competition – he got an early release from his Sharks contract and joined the Bulls.); Roelof Smit; Deon Stegmann	(substituted off) Lappies Labuschagné (to (Japan) Kubota Spears); (substituted off) Freddy Ngoza (to Blue Bulls); (substituted off) Deon Stegmann (to (Japan) Honda Heat)	(substituted on) Shaun Adendorff (from Boland Cavaliers); (substituted on) Marnus Schoeman (from Pumas) (Note: Marnus Schoeman was initially included in the Stormers' squad for the 2017 season, on loan from the Pumas. However, in April 2017 – prior to making any appearances in the competition – he ended his loan move and joined the Bulls on loan instead.); (substituted on) Ruan Steenkamp (from Blue Bulls)	Shaun Adendorff; Arno Botha; Nick de Jager; Jannes Kirsten; Jacques Potgieter; Marnus Schoeman; Roelof Smit (did not play); Ruan Steenkamp
N8	Renaldo Bothma (Note: Renaldo Bothma was initially included in the Sharks' squad for the 2016 season. However, in March 2016 – prior to making any appearances in the competition – he got an early release from his Sharks contract and joined the Bulls.); Hanro Liebenberg			Renaldo Bothma; Hanro Liebenberg
SH	Rudy Paige; Ivan van Zyl; Piet van Zyl		(substituted on) André Warner (from Blue Bulls)	Rudy Paige; Ivan van Zyl; Piet van Zyl; André Warner
FH	Francois Brummer; Handré Pollard (did not play); Tian Schoeman; Joshua Stander (did not play)	(substituted off) Joshua Stander (to Blue Bulls)	(substituted on) Tony Jantjies (from Blue Bulls)	Francois Brummer; Tony Jantjies; Handré Pollard; Tian Schoeman
CE	Dan Kriel; Jesse Kriel; Burger Odendaal; Jan Serfontein; Dries Swanepoel	(substituted off) Dan Kriel (to Stormers)	(substituted on) JT Jackson (from Blue Bulls); (substituted on) Johnny Kôtze (from Stormers); (substituted on) Franco Naudé (from Blue Bulls)	JT Jackson (did not play); Johnny Kôtze (did not play); Jesse Kriel; Franco Naudé; Burger Odendaal; Jan Serfontein; Dries Swanepoel
WG	Bjorn Basson; Travis Ismaiel; Kefentse Mahlo (did not play); Luther Obi (did not play); Jamba Ulengo	(substituted off) Bjorn Basson (to Stormers)	(substituted on) Rabz Maxwane (from Western Province); (substituted on) Jade Stighling (from Blue Bulls)	Travis Ismaiel; Kefentse Mahlo; Rabz Maxwane; Luther Obi (did not play) (Note: Luther Obi was initially included in the Bulls' squad for the 2017 season. However, in March 2017 – prior to making any appearances in the competition – he got an early release from his Bulls contract and joined the Cheetahs.); Jade Stighling; Jamba Ulengo
FB	Warrick Gelant; SP Marais (short-term); Duncan Matthews (did not play)	(substituted off) SP Marais (to Stormers)	(substituted on) Ulrich Beyers (from Blue Bulls)	Ulrich Beyers; Warrick Gelant; Duncan Matthews
Coach	Nollis Marais			Nollis Marais

=== Cheetahs ===
Cheetahs transfers 2016–17
Pos	2016 squad	Out	In	2017 squad
PR	Aranos Coetzee; Luan de Bruin; Charles Marais; Danie Mienie; Ox Nché; Teunis Nieuwoudt (did not play); BG Uys (did not play); Maks van Dyk	(substituted off) Luan de Bruin (to Free State Cheetahs); (substituted off) Teunis Nieuwoudt (to SWD Eagles); (substituted off) BG Uys (to Free State Cheetahs); (substituted off) Maks van Dyk (to (France) Toulouse)	(substituted on) Tom Botha (from Southern Kings)	Tom Botha; Aranos Coetzee; Charles Marais; Danie Mienie; Ox Nché
HK	Jacques du Toit; Joseph Dweba; Elandré Huggett; Neil Rautenbach (did not play); Torsten van Jaarsveld	(substituted off) Neil Rautenbach (to Western Province)	(substituted on) Reinach Venter (from Free State Cheetahs)	Jacques du Toit (did not play); Joseph Dweba; Elandré Huggett; Torsten van Jaarsveld; Reinach Venter
LK	Justin Basson (did not play); Lood de Jager; Reniel Hugo; Armandt Koster; Boela Serfontein (did not play); Francois Uys; Dennis Visser (did not play); Carl Wegner	(substituted off) Lood de Jager (to Bulls); (substituted off) Boela Serfontein (to Griffons)		Justin Basson; Reniel Hugo; Armandt Koster; Francois Uys; Dennis Visser (did not play); Carl Wegner
FL	Willie Britz; Tienie Burger (did not play); Uzair Cassiem; Hilton Lobberts; Steven Meiring (did not play); Oupa Mohojé; Gerhard Olivier (did not play); Boom Prinsloo; Paul Schoeman; Henco Venter	(substituted off) Willie Britz (to (Japan) Sunwolves); (substituted off) Tienie Burger (to Free State Cheetahs); (substituted off) Steven Meiring (to Free State Cheetahs); (substituted off) Gerhard Olivier (to Free State Cheetahs)	(substituted on) Chris Dry (from South Africa Sevens); (substituted on) Junior Pokomela (from Eastern Province Kings)	Uzair Cassiem; Chris Dry; Hilton Lobberts (did not play); Oupa Mohojé; Junior Pokomela; Boom Prinsloo; Paul Schoeman; Henco Venter
N8	Niell Jordaan			Niell Jordaan
SH	Tian Meyer; Zee Mkhabela (did not play); JP Smith (did not play); Ruan van Rensburg (did not play); Shaun Venter	(substituted off) JP Smith (to Free State Cheetahs)		Tian Meyer; Zee Mkhabela; Ruan van Rensburg; Shaun Venter
FH	Sias Ebersohn; Niel Marais; George Whitehead; Fred Zeilinga	(substituted off) Sias Ebersohn (to Pumas); (substituted off) George Whitehead (to Griquas)	(substituted on) Ryno Eksteen (from Stormers); (substituted on) Clinton Swart (from Griquas)	Ryno Eksteen (did not play); Niel Marais; Clinton Swart; Fred Zeilinga
CE	Joubert Engelbrecht; Reinhardt Erwee (did not play); Tertius Kruger (did not play); Nico Lee; William Small-Smith; Michael van der Spuy; Francois Venter	(substituted off) Joubert Engelbrecht (to Griffons); (substituted off) Reinhardt Erwee (to Free State Cheetahs); (substituted off) Tertius Kruger (to Griffons)	(substituted on) Ali Mgijima (from Free State Cheetahs)	Nico Lee; Ali Mgijima; William Small-Smith; Michael van der Spuy; Francois Venter
WG	Rayno Benjamin; Maphutha Dolo (did not play); Gerrie Labuschagné (did not play); Sergeal Petersen; Raymond Rhule	(substituted off) Maphutha Dolo (to Free State Cheetahs); (substituted off) Gerrie Labuschagné (to Free State Cheetahs)	(substituted on) JW Jonker (from Griquas); (substituted on) Luther Obi (from Bulls)	Rayno Benjamin; JW Jonker; Luther Obi; Sergeal Petersen; Raymond Rhule
FB	Clayton Blommetjies; Coenie van Wyk (did not play)	(substituted off) Coenie van Wyk (to (Japan) Toshiba Brave Lupus)		Clayton Blommetjies
Coach	Franco Smith			Franco Smith

=== Kings ===
Southern Kings transfers 2016–17
Pos	2016 squad	Out	In	2017 squad
PR	Justin Ackerman; Jacobie Adriaanse; Louis Albertse; Tom Botha; Schalk Ferreira; Liam Hendricks; Sti Sithole; Vukile Sofisa (did not play)	(substituted off) Justin Ackerman (to Golden Lions); (substituted off) Jacobie Adriaanse (to Bulls); (substituted off) Louis Albertse (to Pumas); (substituted off) Tom Botha (to Cheetahs); (substituted off) Liam Hendricks (to Griquas); (substituted off) Sti Sithole (to Lions); (substituted off) Vukile Sofisa (released)	(substituted on) Justin Forwood (from Eastern Province Kings); (substituted on) Ross Geldenhuys (from (New Zealand) Highlanders); (substituted on) Chris Heiberg (from (Australia) Force); (substituted on) Mzamo Majola (from Sharks); (substituted on) Schalk van der Merwe (from (France) Montpellier); (substituted on) Dayan van der Westhuizen (from Blue Bulls)	Schalk Ferreira; Justin Forwood; Ross Geldenhuys; Chris Heiberg; Mzamo Majola; Schalk van der Merwe; Dayan van der Westhuizen
HK	Martin Bezuidenhout; Martin Ferreira; Edgar Marutlulle	(substituted off) Martin Ferreira (to Western Province); (substituted off) Edgar Marutlulle (to Bulls)	(substituted on) Tango Balekile (from Eastern Province Kings); (substituted on) Kurt Haupt (from SWD Eagles); (substituted on) Mike Willemse (from Stormers)	Tango Balekile (did not play); Martin Bezuidenhout; Kurt Haupt; Mike Willemse
LK	JC Astle; Philip du Preez (did not play); Tazz Fuzani (did not play); Cornell Hess; Sintu Manjezi; Schalk Oelofse; Steven Sykes	(substituted off) JC Astle (to (France) Mont-de-Marsan); (substituted off) Philip du Preez (to (France) Mont-de-Marsan); (substituted off) Tazz Fuzani (to Pumas); (substituted off) Cornell Hess (released); (substituted off) Schalk Oelofse (to (France) Mont-de-Marsan); (substituted off) Steven Sykes (to (France) Oyonnax)	(substituted on) Irné Herbst (from Bulls); (substituted on) Cameron Lindsay (unattached); (substituted on) Giant Mtyanda (from Sharks); (substituted on) Wandile Putuma (from Griquas); (substituted on) Wilhelm van der Sluys (from (England) Worcester Warriors); (substituted on) Mzwanele Zito (from Griquas)	Irné Herbst; Cameron Lindsay (did not play); Sintu Manjezi (did not play); Giant Mtyanda; Wandile Putuma (did not play); Wilhelm van der Sluys; Mzwanele Zito
FL	Thembelani Bholi; Chris Cloete; JP Jonck; Andisa Ntsila; Tyler Paul (did not play); CJ Velleman; Stefan Willemse	(substituted off) JP Jonck (released)		Thembelani Bholi; Chris Cloete; Andisa Ntsila; Tyler Paul; CJ Velleman (did not play); Stefan Willemse
N8	Aidon Davis; Jacques Engelbrecht; Junior Pokomela (did not play)	(substituted off) Aidon Davis (to (France) Toulon); (substituted off) Jacques Engelbrecht (to (France) Montauban); (substituted off) Junior Pokomela (to Cheetahs)	(substituted on) Christiaan de Bruin (from Eastern Province Kings); (substituted on) Ruaan Lerm (from Lions)	Christiaan de Bruin (did not play); Ruaan Lerm
SH	Leighton Eksteen; James Hall; Ntando Kebe; Kevin Luiters	(substituted off) Leighton Eksteen (to SWD Eagles); (substituted off) James Hall (to Oyonnax); (substituted off) Ntando Kebe (to Border Bulldogs); (substituted off) Kevin Luiters (to Pumas)	(substituted on) Louis Schreuder (from Stormers); (substituted on) Ricky Schroeder (from Eastern Province Kings); (substituted on) Johan Steyn (from SWD Eagles); (substituted on) Stefan Ungerer (from Sharks); (substituted on) Rudi van Rooyen (from Griquas)	Louis Schreuder; Ricky Schroeder; Johan Steyn; Stefan Ungerer; Rudi van Rooyen
FH	Louis Fouché; Dewald Human; Theuns Kotzé (did not play); Elgar Watts	(substituted off) Louis Fouché (to (Japan) Kubota Spears); (substituted off) Dewald Human (to Blue Bulls); (substituted off) Theuns Kotzé (to Boland Cavaliers); (substituted off) Elgar Watts (to Griquas)	(substituted on) Masixole Banda (from Border Bulldogs); (substituted on) Lionel Cronjé (unattached); (substituted on) Pieter-Steyn de Wet (from Eastern Province Kings); (substituted on) Garrick Mattheus (from Eastern Province Kings)	Masixole Banda; Lionel Cronjé; Pieter-Steyn de Wet; Garrick Mattheus (did not play)
CE	Lukhanyo Am; JP du Plessis; Shane Gates; Jeremy Ward; Stefan Watermeyer	(substituted off) Lukhanyo Am (to Sharks); (substituted off) JP du Plessis (released); (substituted off) Shane Gates (to (Japan) NTT Communications Shining Arcs); (substituted off) Jeremy Ward (to Sharks); (substituted off) Stefan Watermeyer (retired)	(substituted on) Stokkies Hanekom (from Lions); (substituted on) Berton Klaasen (from Eastern Province Kings); (substituted on) Neil Maritz (from Sharks); (substituted on) Waylon Murray (from Eastern Province Kings)	Stokkies Hanekom; Berton Klaasen; Neil Maritz (did not play); Waylon Murray
WG	Siyanda Grey; Malcolm Jaer; Wandile Mjekevu (Note: Wandile Mjekevu was initially included in the Sharks' squad for the 2016 season. However, in May 2016 – prior to making any appearances in the competition – he got was released by the Sharks contract to join the Kings on a loan deal for the remainder of the season.); Charles Radebe; Luzuko Vulindlu	(substituted off) Charles Radebe (to SWD Eagles)	(substituted on) Alshaun Bock (from Griquas); (substituted on) Makazole Mapimpi (from Border Bulldogs); (substituted on) Yaw Penxe (from Eastern Province Kings)	Alshaun Bock; Siyanda Grey (did not play); Malcolm Jaer; Makazole Mapimpi; Wandile Mjekevu; Yaw Penxe; Luzuko Vulindlu
FB	Jaco van Tonder; Jurgen Visser	(substituted off) Jaco van Tonder (to (Italy) Valpolicella); (substituted off) Jurgen Visser (to (Japan) NTT DoCoMo Red Hurricanes)	(substituted on) Chrysander Botha (from (Namibia) Welwitschias); (substituted on) Ntabeni Dukisa (from Griquas); (substituted on) Johann Tromp (from Eastern Province Kings)	Chrysander Botha; Ntabeni Dukisa; Johann Tromp
Coach	Deon Davids			Deon Davids

=== Lions ===
Lions transfers 2016–17
Pos	2016 squad	Out	In	2017 squad
PR	Ruan Dreyer; Corné Fourie; Julian Redelinghuys; Pieter Scholtz; Dylan Smith; Clinton Theron; Jacques van Rooyen	(substituted off) Julian Redelinghuys (injured); (substituted off) Pieter Scholtz (to Golden Lions); (substituted off) Clinton Theron (to Boland Cavaliers)	(substituted on) Justin Ackerman (from Southern Kings); (substituted on) Johannes Jonker (from Border Bulldogs); (substituted on) Sti Sithole (from Southern Kings); (substituted on) Hencus van Wyk (from Bulls)	Justin Ackerman (did not play); Ruan Dreyer; Corné Fourie; Johannes Jonker; Sti Sithole; Dylan Smith; Jacques van Rooyen; Hencus van Wyk
HK	Robbie Coetzee; Malcolm Marx; Ramone Samuels; Akker van der Merwe	(substituted off) Ramone Samuels (to Stormers)		Robbie Coetzee; Malcolm Marx; Akker van der Merwe
LK	Lourens Erasmus; Andries Ferreira; Robert Kruger; MB Lusaseni (did not play); Franco Mostert; Martin Muller	(substituted off) MB Lusaseni (retired); (substituted off) Martin Muller (released)	(substituted on) Marvin Orie (from Bulls)	Lourens Erasmus; Andries Ferreira; Robert Kruger; Franco Mostert; Marvin Orie
FL	Ruan Ackermann; Fabian Booysen; Cyle Brink; Stephan de Wit; Jaco Kriel; Ruaan Lerm; Warwick Tecklenburg	(substituted off) Stephan de Wit (to Stormers); (substituted off) Ruaan Lerm (to Southern Kings); (substituted off) Warwick Tecklenburg (retired)	(substituted on) Hacjivah Dayimani (from Golden Lions); (substituted on) Kwagga Smith (from Golden Lions)	Ruan Ackermann; Fabian Booysen (did not play); Cyle Brink; Hacjivah Dayimani (did not play); Jaco Kriel; Kwagga Smith
N8	Warren Whiteley			Warren Whiteley
SH	Ross Cronjé; Faf de Klerk; Dillon Smit			Ross Cronjé; Faf de Klerk; Dillon Smit
FH	Marnitz Boshoff; Andries Coetzee; Ashlon Davids; Elton Jantjies	(substituted off) Marnitz Boshoff (to (Ireland) Connacht); (substituted off) Ashlon Davids (to Golden Lions)	(substituted on) Shaun Reynolds (from Golden Lions)	Andries Coetzee; Elton Jantjies; Shaun Reynolds
CE	Stokkies Hanekom; Rohan Janse van Rensburg; Lionel Mapoe; Howard Mnisi; Jacques Nel; Harold Vorster	(substituted off) Stokkies Hanekom (to Southern Kings)		Rohan Janse van Rensburg; Lionel Mapoe; Howard Mnisi; Jacques Nel; Harold Vorster
WG	Ruan Combrinck; Koch Marx; Sampie Mastriet (did not play); Courtnall Skosan; Anthony Volmink	(substituted off) Koch Marx (to Golden Lions); (substituted off) Sampie Mastriet (released)	(substituted on) Madosh Tambwe (from Golden Lions)	Ruan Combrinck; Courtnall Skosan; Madosh Tambwe; Anthony Volmink
FB	JW Bell; Sylvian Mahuza; Jaco van der Walt	(substituted off) JW Bell (to (Spain) Valladolid)		Sylvian Mahuza; Jaco van der Walt
Coach	Johan Ackermann			Johan Ackermann

=== Sharks ===
Sharks transfers 2016–17
Pos	2016 squad	Out	In	2017 squad
PR	Lourens Adriaanse; Dale Chadwick; Thomas du Toit; Gerhard Engelbrecht (did not play); Tendai Mtawarira; Coenie Oosthuizen; Juan Schoeman	(substituted off) Dale Chadwick (to (France) Narbonne); (substituted off) Gerhard Engelbrecht (to Griffons)	(substituted on) John-Hubert Meyer (from Sharks (Currie Cup))	Lourens Adriaanse; Thomas du Toit; John-Hubert Meyer; Tendai Mtawarira; Coenie Oosthuizen; Juan Schoeman
HK	Kyle Cooper; Franco Marais; Chiliboy Ralepelle	(substituted off) Kyle Cooper (to (England) Newcastle Falcons)	(substituted on) Stephan Coetzee (from Sharks (Currie Cup))	Stephan Coetzee; Franco Marais; Chiliboy Ralepelle
LK	Hyron Andrews; Ruan Botha; Stephan Lewies; David McDuling; Giant Mtyanda; Etienne Oosthuizen; Tjiuee Uanivi (did not play)	(substituted off) David McDuling (to (New Zealand) Canterbury); (substituted off) Giant Mtyanda (to Southern Kings); (substituted off) Tjiuee Uanivi (to (Scotland) Glasgow Warriors)	(substituted on) Jean Droste (from Sharks (Currie Cup))	Hyron Andrews; Ruan Botha; Jean Droste; Stephan Lewies; Etienne Oosthuizen
FL	Marcell Coetzee; Keegan Daniel; Jean Deysel; Jean-Luc du Preez; Francois Kleinhans (did not play); Khaya Majola (did not play); Tera Mtembu; Jacques Potgieter (did not play)	(substituted off) Marcell Coetzee (to (Ireland) Ulster); (substituted off) Jacques Potgieter (to Bulls)	(substituted on) Jacques Vermeulen (from Stormers)	Keegan Daniel (did not play); Jean Deysel (did not play); Jean-Luc du Preez; Francois Kleinhans (did not play); Khaya Majola (did not play); Tera Mtembu; Jacques Vermeulen
N8	Renaldo Bothma (did not play); Dan du Preez; Philip van der Walt	(substituted off) Renaldo Bothma (to Bulls)		Dan du Preez; Philip van der Walt
SH	Michael Claassens; Cobus Reinach; Stefan Ungerer	(substituted off) Stefan Ungerer (to Southern Kings)	(substituted on) Rowan Gouws (from Sharks (Currie Cup)); (substituted on) Hanco Venter (from Sharks (Currie Cup))	Michael Claassens; Rowan Gouws (did not play); Cobus Reinach; Hanco Venter (did not play)
FH	Garth April; Patrick Lambie; Inny Radebe (did not play)		(substituted on) Benhard Janse van Rensburg (from Sharks (Currie Cup))	Garth April; Benhard Janse van Rensburg; Patrick Lambie; Inny Radebe
CE	Johan Deysel (did not play); André Esterhuizen; Paul Jordaan; Marius Louw (did not play); Heimar Williams	(substituted off) Paul Jordaan (to (France) La Rochelle); (substituted off) Heimar Williams (retired)	(substituted on) Lukhanyo Am (from Southern Kings); (substituted on) Tristan Blewett (from Sharks (Currie Cup)); (substituted on) Jeremy Ward (from Southern Kings)	Lukhanyo Am; Tristan Blewett (did not play); Johan Deysel; André Esterhuizen; Marius Louw; Jeremy Ward
WG	Wandile Mjekevu (did not play); Lwazi Mvovo; Odwa Ndungane; JP Pietersen; S'bura Sithole	(substituted off) Wandile Mjekevu (loaned to Southern Kings); (substituted off) JP Pietersen (to (England) Leicester Tigers)	(substituted on) S'busiso Nkosi (from Sharks (Currie Cup)); (substituted on) Kobus van Wyk (from Stormers)	Lwazi Mvovo; Odwa Ndungane; S'busiso Nkosi; S'bura Sithole; Kobus van Wyk
FB	Curwin Bosch; Willie le Roux; Joe Pietersen; Rhyno Smith	(substituted off) Willie le Roux (to (England) Wasps); (substituted off) Joe Pietersen (to (Japan) Kamaishi Seawaves)	(substituted on) Clément Poitrenaud (from (France) Toulouse)	Curwin Bosch; Clément Poitrenaud; Rhyno Smith
Coach	Gary Gold	(substituted off) Gary Gold (to (England) Worcester Warriors)	(substituted on) Robert du Preez (from Sharks (Currie Cup))	Robert du Preez

=== Stormers ===
Stormers transfers 2016–17
Pos	2016 squad	Out	In	2017 squad
PR	JC Janse van Rensburg; Oli Kebble; Vincent Koch; Wilco Louw; Frans Malherbe; JP Smith; Alistair Vermaak	(substituted off) Vincent Koch (to (England) Saracens); (substituted off) JP Smith (released)	(substituted on) Steven Kitshoff (from (France) Bordeaux); (substituted on) Caylib Oosthuizen (from Eastern Province Kings); (substituted on) Frans van Wyk (from Western Province)	JC Janse van Rensburg; Oli Kebble; Steven Kitshoff (short-term); Wilco Louw; Frans Malherbe; Caylib Oosthuizen; Frans van Wyk; Alistair Vermaak
HK	Bongi Mbonambi; Scarra Ntubeni; Mike Willemse	(substituted off) Scarra Ntubeni (injured); (substituted off) Mike Willemse (to Southern Kings)	(substituted on) Dean Muir (from Falcons); (substituted on) Ramone Samuels (from Lions); (substituted on) Chad Solomon (from Western Province)	Bongi Mbonambi; Dean Muir (did not play); Ramone Samuels; Chad Solomon (did not play)
LK	Jan de Klerk; Pieter-Steph du Toit; Eben Etzebeth; Jean Kleyn; David Ribbans (did not play); JD Schickerling; Chris van Zyl	(substituted off) Jean Kleyn (to (Ireland) Munster); (substituted off) David Ribbans (to (England) Northampton Saints)	(substituted on) Eduard Zandberg (from Western Province)	Jan de Klerk; Pieter-Steph du Toit; Eben Etzebeth; JD Schickerling; Chris van Zyl; Eduard Zandberg (did not play)
FL	Schalk Burger; Rynhardt Elstadt; Siya Kolisi; Sikhumbuzo Notshe; Jurie van Vuuren (did not play); Jacques Vermeulen (did not play)	(substituted off) Schalk Burger (to (England) Saracens); (substituted off) Jurie van Vuuren (to Western Province); (substituted off) Jacques Vermeulen (to Sharks)	(substituted on) Stephan de Wit (from Lions); (substituted on) Johan du Toit (from Sharks); (substituted on) Marnus Schoeman (from Pumas); (substituted on) Cobus Wiese (from Western Province)	Stephan de Wit; Johan du Toit (did not play); Rynhardt Elstadt; Siya Kolisi; Sikhumbuzo Notshe; Marnus Schoeman (did not play); Cobus Wiese
N8	Nizaam Carr; Kobus van Dyk		(substituted on) Juarno Augustus (from Western Province); (substituted on) Jaco Coetzee (from Western Province)	Juarno Augustus; Nizaam Carr; Jaco Coetzee; Kobus van Dyk
SH	Nic Groom; Godlen Masimla; Justin Phillips (did not play); Louis Schreuder; Jano Vermaak	(substituted off) Nic Groom (to (England) Northampton Saints); (substituted off) Louis Schreuder (to Southern Kings)	(substituted on) Dewaldt Duvenage (from (France) Perpignan)	Dewaldt Duvenage; Godlen Masimla; Justin Phillips; Jano Vermaak
FH	Kurt Coleman; Jean-Luc du Plessis; Robert du Preez; Ryno Eksteen (did not play); Brandon Thomson	(substituted off) Ryno Eksteen (to Cheetahs)	(substituted on) Damian Willemse (from Western Province)	Kurt Coleman; Jean-Luc du Plessis; Robert du Preez; Brandon Thomson; Damian Willemse
CE	Damian de Allende; Juan de Jongh; Daniël du Plessis; Huw Jones; Jaco Taute	(substituted off) Jaco Taute (to (Ireland) Munster)	(substituted on) Dan Kriel (from Bulls); (substituted on) Shaun Treeby (from (New Zealand) Wellington)	Damian de Allende; Juan de Jongh; Daniël du Plessis; Huw Jones (did not play); Dan Kriel; Shaun Treeby (short-term)
WG	Cornal Hendricks (did not play); Johnny Kôtze; Dillyn Leyds; Seabelo Senatla (did not play); Scott van Breda; Kobus van Wyk; Leolin Zas	(substituted off) Cornal Hendricks (to (France) Toulon); (substituted off) Johnny Kôtze (to Bulls); (substituted off) Scott van Breda (released); (substituted off) Kobus van Wyk (to Sharks); (substituted off) Leolin Zas (injured)	(substituted on) Bjorn Basson (from Bulls); (substituted on) Khanyo Ngcukana (from Western Province)	Bjorn Basson; Dillyn Leyds; Khanyo Ngcukana (did not play); Seabelo Senatla
FB	Cheslin Kolbe; EW Viljoen (did not play)		(substituted on) SP Marais (from Bulls)	Cheslin Kolbe; SP Marais; EW Viljoen
Coach	Robbie Fleck			Robbie Fleck

== See also ==
- List of 2016–17 Premiership Rugby transfers
- List of 2016–17 Pro12 transfers
- List of 2016–17 Top 14 transfers
- List of 2016–17 RFU Championship transfers
- SANZAAR
- Super Rugby franchise areas
