= 2018 Lions (Super Rugby) season =

Lions
- 2018 season
- Head coach: Swys de Bruin
- Captain: Warren Whiteley
- Stadium: Emirates Airline Park, Johannesburg
- Overall: 2nd
- South African Conference: 1st
- Play-offs: Losing finalist
- Record: Won 9, Lost 7
- Top try scorer: All: Malcolm Marx (12)
- Top points scorer: All: Elton Jantjies (173)
Home colours	Away colours

In 2018, the Lions participated in the 2018 Super Rugby competition, the 23rd edition of the competition since its inception in 1996. They were included in the South African Conference of the competition, along with the Bulls, Jaguares, Sharks and Stormers.

== Personnel ==
=== Coaches and management ===
The Lions coaching and management staff for the 2018 Super Rugby season were:

2018 Lions coaches and management
Name	Title
Swys de Bruin	Head coach
Philip Lemmer	Assistant coach (forwards)
Joey Mongalo	Assistant coach (breakdown and backline)
Ivan van Rooyen	Head of Strength & Conditioning
Mustapha Boomgaard	Manager
Johane Singwane	Assistant manager
Dr Rob Collins	Head physician
Preven Appalsamy	Physiotherapist
Ram Mpila	Massage therapist
Neil de Bruin	Kicking & skills coach
Wynand Ellis	Video analyst

=== Squad ===
The following players were named in the Lions squad for the 2018 Super Rugby season:

2018 Lions squad
Player	Position/s	Date of birth (age)	Super Rugby		Lions	
Player	Position/s	Date of birth (age)	Apps	Pts	Apps	Pts
(South Africa) Jacobie Adriaanse	Prop	19 July 1985 (aged 32)	33	0	0	0
(South Africa) Cyle Brink	Loose forward	16 January 1994 (aged 24)	22	5	22	5
(South Africa) Andries Coetzee	Fullback	1 March 1990 (aged 27)	61	47	60	47
(South Africa) Robbie Coetzee	Hooker	2 May 1989 (aged 28)	35	10	35	10
(South Africa) Ruan Combrinck	Wing	10 May 1990 (aged 27)	52	123	52	123
(South Africa) Ross Cronjé	Scrum-half	26 July 1989 (aged 28)	63	30	63	30
(South Africa) Ashlon Davids	Fly-half	24 June 1993 (aged 24)	1	0	1	0
(South Africa) Hacjivah Dayimani	Loose forward	23 September 1997 (aged 20)	0	0	0	0
(South Africa) Ruan Dreyer	Prop	16 September 1990 (aged 27)	60	10	60	10
(South Africa) Aphiwe Dyantyi	Wing	26 August 1994 (aged 23)	0	0	0	0
(South Africa) Willie Engelbrecht	Loose forward	27 July 1992 (aged 25)	0	0	0	0
(South Africa) Lourens Erasmus	Lock	14 June 1993 (aged 24)	26	10	26	10
(South Africa) Andries Ferreira	Lock	29 March 1990 (aged 27)	39	10	39	10
(South Africa) Corné Fourie	Prop	2 September 1988 (aged 29)	55	20	55	20
(South Africa) Nic Groom	Scrum-half	21 February 1990 (aged 27)	57	25	0	0
(South Africa) Rhyno Herbst	Lock	5 July 1996 (aged 21)	0	0	0	0
(South Africa) Rohan Janse van Rensburg	Centre	11 September 1994 (aged 23)	27	75	27	75
(South Africa) Marco Jansen van Vuren	Scrum-half	14 June 1996 (aged 21)	0	0	0	0
(South Africa) Elton Jantjies	Fly-half	1 August 1990 (aged 27)	100	806	87	795
(South Africa) Johannes Jonker	Prop	22 August 1994 (aged 23)	16	0	16	0
(South Africa) Jaco Kriel	Loose forward	21 August 1989 (aged 28)	69	105	69	105
(South Africa) Robert Kruger	Lock	28 April 1988 (aged 29)	30	0	30	0
(South Africa) Sylvian Mahuza	Fullback	29 July 1993 (aged 24)	20	30	20	30
(South Africa) Lionel Mapoe	Centre	13 July 1988 (aged 29)	94	135	77	120
(South Africa) Malcolm Marx	Hooker	13 July 1994 (aged 23)	38	75	38	75
(South Africa) Len Massyn	Loose forward	21 May 1997 (aged 20)	0	0	0	0
(South Africa) Christiaan Meyer	Scrum-half	16 May 1994 (aged 23)	0	0	0	0
(South Africa) Howard Mnisi	Centre	13 July 1989 (aged 28)	36	10	33	10
(South Africa) Franco Mostert	Lock	27 November 1990 (aged 27)	64	15	64	15
(South Africa) Marvin Orie	Lock	15 February 1993 (aged 25)	11	0	1	0
(South Africa) Shaun Reynolds	Fly-half	15 June 1995 (aged 22)	1	2	1	2
(South Africa) Marnus Schoeman	Loose forward	9 February 1989 (aged 29)	1	0	0	0
(South Africa) Sti Sithole	Prop	31 March 1993 (aged 24)	11	0	1	0
(South Africa) Courtnall Skosan	Wing	24 July 1991 (aged 26)	54	125	54	125
(South Africa) Dillon Smit	Scrum-half	11 December 1992 (aged 25)	12	0	12	0
(South Africa) Dylan Smith	Prop	26 February 1994 (aged 23)	18	0	18	0
(South Africa) Kwagga Smith	Loose forward	11 June 1993 (aged 24)	21	40	21	40
(Democratic Republic of the Congo) Madosh Tambwe	Wing	12 May 1997 (aged 20)	5	10	5	10
(South Africa) Jacques van Rooyen	Prop	24 October 1986 (aged 31)	49	20	49	20
(South Africa) Harold Vorster	Centre	11 October 1993 (aged 24)	34	40	34	40
(South Africa) Warren Whiteley	Loose forward	18 September 1987 (aged 30)	79	65	79	65
Note: Players' ages and statistics are correct as of 17 February 2018, the date of the opening round of the competition.

== Standings ==
2018 Super Rugby standings
Pos	Team	Pld	W	D	L	PF	PA	PD	TF	TA	TB	LB	Pts	Qualification
1	Crusaders (C)	16	14	0	2	542	295	+247	77	39	7	0	63	Quarter-finals (Conference leaders)
2	Lions	16	9	0	7	519	435	+84	77	55	6	4	46	Quarter-finals (Conference leaders)
3	Waratahs	16	9	1	6	557	445	+112	74	59	4	2	44	Quarter-finals (Conference leaders)
4	Hurricanes	16	11	0	5	474	343	+131	66	43	5	2	51	Quarter-finals (Wildcard)
5	Chiefs	16	11	0	5	463	368	+95	60	48	3	2	49	Quarter-finals (Wildcard)
6	Highlanders	16	10	0	6	437	445	−8	59	57	3	1	44	Quarter-finals (Wildcard)
7	Jaguares	16	9	0	7	409	418	−9	51	55	2	0	38	Quarter-finals (Wildcard)
8	Sharks	16	7	1	8	437	442	−5	49	57	2	4	36	Quarter-finals (Wildcard)
9	Rebels	16	7	0	9	440	461	−21	57	60	5	3	36	
10	Brumbies	16	7	0	9	393	422	−29	56	52	2	4	34	
11	Stormers	16	6	0	10	390	423	−33	46	56	0	5	29	
12	Bulls	16	6	0	10	441	502	−61	59	66	2	3	29	
13	Reds	16	6	0	10	389	501	−112	49	66	1	3	28	
14	Blues	16	4	0	12	378	509	−131	50	66	2	4	22	
15	Sunwolves	16	3	0	13	404	664	−260	48	99	0	2	14	

Source: Super Rugby

=== Round-by-round ===
The table below shows the Lions' progression throughout the season. For each round, their cumulative points total is shown with the overall log position:

Team	R1	R2	R3	R4	R5	R6	R7	R8	R9	R10	R11	R12	R13	R14	R15	R16	R17	R18	R19	QF	SF	Final
Opposition	SHA	JAG	BUL	BLU	SUN	JAG	CRU	STO	Bye	WAR	RED	HUR	HIG	BRU	STO	Bye	SHA	Bye	BUL	JAG	WAR	Lost
Cumulative Points	4	9	14	15	19	19	20	25	25	30	31	31	31	36	40	40	41	41	46	Won	Won	Lost
Position (overall)	4th	1st	1st	2nd	1st	2nd	2nd	1st	2nd	1st	2nd	2nd	2nd	2nd	2nd	2nd	2nd	3rd	2nd			
Position (SA Conf.)	2nd	1st	1st	1st	1st	1st	1st	1st	1st	1st	1st	1st	1st	1st	1st	1st	1st	1st	1st			
Key:	win	draw	loss	bye																		

== Matches ==
The Lions played the following matches during the 2018 Super Rugby season:

17 February 2018	Lions	26–19	Sharks	Emirates Airline Park, Johannesburg
17:15	Try: Lionel Mapoe 17', 52'; Aphiwe Dyantyi 22'; Kwagga Smith 59'; Con: Elton Jantjies 18', 24', 53'	Report; Scoreboard	Try: Robert du Preez 8'; S'busiso Nkosi 42'; Makazole Mapimpi 55'; Con: Robert du Preez 9', 56'	Referee: Glen Jackson

24 February 2018	Lions	47–27	Jaguares	Emirates Airline Park, Johannesburg
15:05	Try: Aphiwe Dyantyi 27', 52' penalty try 33'; Andries Coetzee 39'; Sylvian Mahuza 47'; Rohan Janse van Rensburg 64'; Warren Whiteley 79'; Con: Elton Jantjies 40', 48', 53', 65', 80'	Report; Scoreboard	Try: Emiliano Boffelli 3'; Bautista Delguy 72', 76'; Con: Nicolás Sánchez 4', 72', 76'; Pen: Emiliano Boffelli 18'; Nicolás Sánchez 51'; Cards: Bautista Delguy (yellow card) 33' to 43'; Julián Montoya (yellow card) 71'	Referee: Jaco Peyper

3 March 2018	Bulls	35–49	Lions	Loftus Versfeld, Pretoria
17:15	Try: Johnny Kôtze 35'; Handré Pollard 41'; Lizo Gqoboka 76'; Travis Ismaiel 78'; Con: Marnitz Boshoff 42'; Francois Brummer 77', 79'; Pen: Marnitz Boshoff 6', 23', 28'; Cards: Conraad van Vuuren (yellow card) 54' to 64'; Nick de Jager (yellow card) 55' to 65'	Report; Scoreboard	Try: Ruan Dreyer 14'; Jacques van Rooyen 18'; Marvin Orie 32'; Malcolm Marx 51' penalty try 55'; Sylvian Mahuza 56'; Ross Cronjé 71'; Con: Elton Jantjies 15', 19', 33', 52', 57', 72'	Referee: Marius van der Westhuizen

10 March 2018	Lions	35–38	Blues	Emirates Airline Park, Johannesburg
17:15	Try: Sylvian Mahuza 2'; Rohan Janse van Rensburg 15'; Elton Jantjies 37'; Aphiwe Dyantyi 55'; Dylan Smith 73'; Con: Elton Jantjies 4', 17', 39', 56', 74'	Report; Scoreboard	Try: Akira Ioane 39'; Rieko Ioane 63', 69'; Jimmy Tupou 75'; Murphy Taramai 80'; Con: Bryn Gatland 40'; Stephen Perofeta 64', 70', 76', 80'; Pen: Bryn Gatland 22'	Attendance: 14,032; Referee: Nic Berry

17 March 2018	Lions	40–38	Sunwolves	Emirates Airline Park, Johannesburg
17:15	Try: Andries Coetzee 8'; Marvin Orie 19'; Malcolm Marx 27', 62'; Aphiwe Dyantyi 41'; Rohan Janse van Rensburg 72'; Con: Elton Jantjies 10', 20', 42', 63', 72'	Report; Scoreboard	Try: Kotaro Matsushima 22'; Craig Millar 31'; Hosea Saumaki 51'; Kazuki Himeno 59'; Atsushi Sakate 80'; Con: Will Tupou 23', 32', 52'; Ryoto Nakamura 60', 80'; Pen: Will Tupou 2'	Referee: Rasta Rasivhenge

24 March 2018	Jaguares	49–35	Lions	José Amalfitani Stadium, Buenos Aires
16:40	Try: Bautista Delguy 1'; Emiliano Boffelli 28', 47'; Javier Ortega Desio 40', 72'; Bautista Ezcurra 65'; Con: Nicolás Sánchez 2', 40', 48', 66', 73'; Pen: Nicolás Sánchez 11', 37', 75'	Report; Scoreboard	Try: Marvin Orie 17'; Sylvian Mahuza 22'; Malcolm Marx 56', 67'; Lourens Erasmus 62'; Con: Elton Jantjies 18', 23', 58', 63', 68'	Referee: Jamie Nutbrown

1 April 2018	Lions	8–14	Crusaders	Emirates Airline Park, Johannesburg
14:30	Try: Madosh Tambwe 14'; Pen: Elton Jantjies 77'	Report; Scoreboard	Try: Sam Whitelock 50'; Jack Goodhue 53'; Con: Mitchell Hunt 51', 54'	Referee: Jaco Peyper

7 April 2018	Lions	52–31	Stormers	Emirates Airline Park, Johannesburg
17:15	Try: Madosh Tambwe 1', 9', 13', 52'; Lionel Mapoe 26'; Kwagga Smith 40'; Franco Mostert 46'; Ruan Combrinck 62'; Con: Elton Jantjies 2', 14', 40', 47', 53', 63'; Cards: Marvin Orie (yellow card) 77'	Report; Scoreboard	Try: Wilco Louw 21'; Damian Willemse 59'; Paul de Wet 73' penalty try 80'; Con: SP Marais 22', 60'; Damian Willemse 73'; Pen: SP Marais 36'	Referee: Jaco Peyper

20 April 2018	Waratahs	0–29	Lions	Allianz Stadium, Sydney
19:45		Report; Scoreboard	Try: Madosh Tambwe 22'; Kwagga Smith 44'; Harold Vorster 50'; Marnus Schoeman 77'; Con: Elton Jantjies 23', 51', 78'; Pen: Elton Jantjies 71'	Referee: Mike Fraser

28 April 2018	Reds	27–22	Lions	Suncorp Stadium, Brisbane
15:05	Try: JP Smith 2'; Caleb Timu 11'; Brandon Paenga-Amosa 27'; George Smith 40'; Con: Filipo Daugunu 28', 40'; Pen: Filipo Daugunu 48'	Report; Scoreboard	Try: Malcolm Marx 55', 61'; Marnus Schoeman 79', 80'; Con: Elton Jantjies 62'	Referee: Angus Gardner

5 May 2018	Hurricanes	28–19	Lions	Westpac Stadium, Wellington
19:35	Try: Ben Lam 8', 45', 54'; Ardie Savea 25'; Con: Beauden Barrett 9', 27', 47', 56'	Report; Scoreboard	Try: Nic Groom 40'; Marnus Schoeman 57'; Sylvian Mahuza 75'; Con: Elton Jantjies 40', 76'	Referee: Nic Berry

12 May 2018	Highlanders	39–27	Lions	Forsyth Barr Stadium, Dunedin
19:35	Try: Lima Sopoaga 4'; Liam Coltman 14'; Luke Whitelock 34'; Waisake Naholo 44'; Teihorangi Walden 64'; Con: Lima Sopoaga 6', 15', 45', 65'; Pen: Lima Sopoaga 77', 80'	Report; Scoreboard	Try: Harold Vorster 39'; Robbie Coetzee 40', 49'; Marnus Schoeman 73'; Con: Elton Jantjies 40', 73'; Pen: Elton Jantjies 10'	Referee: Angus Gardner

19 May 2018	Lions	42–24	Brumbies	Emirates Airline Park, Johannesburg
17:15	Try: Rohan Janse van Rensburg 9'; Robbie Coetzee 30'; Ruan Dreyer 40'; Marnus Schoeman 63'; Shaun Reynolds 74'; Lourens Erasmus 76'; Con: Elton Jantjies 11', 31', 40', 64', 74', 76'	Report; Scoreboard	Try: Tom Banks 2', 52'; Tevita Kuridrani 17'; Con: Christian Lealiifano 3', 17', 53'; Pen: Christian Lealiifano 37'; Cards: Rory Arnold (yellow card) 30' to 40' (red card) 61'; Sam Carter (yellow card) 62' to 72'	Referee: Nick Briant

26 May 2018	Stormers	23–26	Lions	DHL Newlands, Cape Town
17:15	Try: Dewaldt Duvenage 4'; Raymond Rhule 30'; Con: Jean-Luc du Plessis 5', 32'; Pen: Jean-Luc du Plessis 19', 67', 71'; Cards: JJ Engelbrecht (yellow card) 37' to 47'; Raymond Rhule (red card) 51'; Jaco Coetzee (yellow card) 60' to 70'	Report; Scoreboard	Try: Nic Groom 21'; Corné Fourie 54', 59'; Madosh Tambwe 76'; Con: Elton Jantjies 22', 61', 77'	Referee: Nick Briant

30 June 2018	Sharks	31–24	Lions	Kings Park Stadium, Durban
17:15	Try: Dan du Preez 3'; André Esterhuizen 59'; Lwazi Mvovo 68'; Con: Robert du Preez 59', 70'; Pen: Robert du Preez 13', 39', 63', 73'	Report; Scoreboard	Try: Ruan Combrinck 8'; Cyle Brink 17'; Kwagga Smith 40'; Con: Elton Jantjies 9', 18', 40'; Pen: Elton Jantjies 65'	Referee: Jaco Peyper

14 July 2018	Lions	38–12	Bulls	Emirates Airline Park, Johannesburg
15:05	Try: Ruan Combrinck 18', 65'; Malcolm Marx 31'; Courtnall Skosan 40' penalty try 63'; Aphiwe Dyantyi 80'; Con: Elton Jantjies 19', 40'; Andries Coetzee 80'	Report; Scoreboard	Try: Manie Libbok 7'; Jesse Kriel 12'; Con: Manie Libbok 8'; Cards: Pierre Schoeman (yellow card) 34' to 44'	Referee: Marius van der Westhuizen

Qualifier	21 July 2018	Lions	40–23	Jaguares	Emirates Airline Park, Johannesburg
	15:05	Try: Ruan Combrinck 8'; Harold Vorster 15'; Malcolm Marx 27'; Andries Coetzee 57'; Con: Elton Jantjies 9', 16', 28', 58'; Pen: Elton Jantjies 26', 44', 76'; Drop: Elton Jantjies 64'	Report; Scoreboard	Try: Bautista Delguy 42'; Pablo Matera 48'; Con: Nicolás Sánchez 43', 49'; Pen: Nicolás Sánchez 4', 6', 37'	Referee: Jaco Peyper

Semifinal	28 July 2018	Lions	44–26	Waratahs	Emirates Airline Park, Johannesburg
	15:05	Try: Kwagga Smith 21', 63'; Aphiwe Dyantyi 26'; Malcolm Marx 35', 58'; Courtnall Skosan 79'; Con: Elton Jantjies 28', 37', 64', 80'; Pen: Elton Jantjies 55', 74'	Report; Scoreboard	Try: Ned Hanigan 4'; Israel Folau 8'; Tom Robertson 39'; Jake Gordon 76'; Con: Bernard Foley 6', 10', 76'; Cards: Damien Fitzpatrick (yellow card) 57' to 67'	Referee: Glen Jackson

Final	4 August 2018	Crusaders	37–18	Lions	AMI Stadium, Christchurch
	19:35	Try: Seta Tamanivalu 19'; David Havili 34'; Mitchell Drummond 62'; Scott Barrett 70'; Con: Richie Mo'unga 20', 36', 63', 71'; Pen: Richie Mo'unga 16', 33', 43'; Cards: Ryan Crotty (yellow card) 67' to 77'	Report; Scoreboard	Try: Cyle Brink 53'; Malcolm Marx 68'; Con: Elton Jantjies 54'; Pen: Elton Jantjies 13', 39'	Referee: Angus Gardner

== Player statistics ==
The Super Rugby appearance record for players that represented the Lions in 2018 is as follows:

2018 Lions player statistics
Player name	SHA	JAG	BUL	BLU	SUN	JAG	CRU	STO	WAR	RED	HUR	HIG	BRU	STO	SHA	BUL	JAG	WAR	CRU	App	Try	Con	Pen	DG	Pts
Jacques van Rooyen	1	1	1	1		1	17 (substituted in)	17 (substituted in)	1	1		16 (substituted in)	17 (substituted in)	1	17 (substituted in)	1	1	1	1	17	1	0	0	0	5
Malcolm Marx	2	2	2	2	2	16 (substituted in)	2	2	2	2	2				2	2	2	2	2	16	12	0	0	0	60
Ruan Dreyer	3	3	3	3		3	3	3	3	3	17 (substituted in)	17 (substituted in)	3	3	3	3	3	3	3	18	2	0	0	0	10
Marvin Orie	4		5	5	5	4	20 (substituted in)	4	5	5	19 (substituted in)	5	5	5	4	4	4	4	4	18	3	0	0	0	15
Franco Mostert	5	5	7	7	7	5	5	5	7	7	5	7	7	7	5	5	5	5	5	19	1	0	0	0	5
Kwagga Smith	6	6		20 (substituted in)	6	8	6	6	6	6	8	8	6	8	6	6	6	6	6	18	6	0	0	0	30
Cyle Brink	7	7	6	6		6	7	7		20 (substituted in)	7	6			7	7	7		7	14	2	0	0	0	10
Warren Whiteley	8	8	8	8											8	8	8	8	8	9	1	0	0	0	5
Ross Cronjé	9	9	9	9	9								21 (substituted in)	21 (substituted in)	9	21 (substituted in)	9	9	9	12	1	0	0	0	5
Elton Jantjies	10	10	10	10	10	10	10	10	10	10	10	10	10	10	10	10	10	10	10	19	1	66	11	1	173
Aphiwe Dyantyi	11	11	11	11	11	11					11	11	13	11	11	22 (substituted in)	11	11	22 (substituted in)	15	7	0	0	0	35
Harold Vorster	12	12	22 (substituted in)	22 (substituted in)	12		12	12	12	13	12	12		12	12	12	12	12	12	17	3	0	0	0	15
Lionel Mapoe	13	13	13	13	13	13	13	13	13		13	13			13	13	13	13	13	16	3	0	0	0	15
Sylvian Mahuza	14	14	14	14		14	14	23 (substituted in)	23 (substituted in)		23 (substituted in)	23 (substituted in)	14							11	5	0	0	0	25
Andries Coetzee	15	15	15	15	15	15	15	15	15	15	15	15	15	15	15	15	15	15	15	19	3	1	0	0	17
Robbie Coetzee	16	16 (substituted in)	16 (substituted in)	16	16	2			16 (substituted in)	16 (substituted in)	16 (substituted in)	2	2	2						9	3	0	0	0	15
Dylan Smith	17 (substituted in)	17 (substituted in)	17 (substituted in)	17 (substituted in)	1	17 (substituted in)	1	1	17 (substituted in)	17 (substituted in)	1	1	1	17 (substituted in)	1		17 (substituted in)	17 (substituted in)	17 (substituted in)	18	1	0	0	0	5
Jacobie Adriaanse	18 (substituted in)	18 (substituted in)	18 (substituted in)	18 (substituted in)	3		18 (substituted in)		18 (substituted in)		3	18 (substituted in)		18 (substituted in)						10	0	0	0	0	0
Lourens Erasmus	19 (substituted in)	19 (substituted in)	19 (substituted in)	19 (substituted in)	4	19 (substituted in)	19 (substituted in)	19 (substituted in)	19 (substituted in)	19 (substituted in)	4	19 (substituted in)	4	4	19 (substituted in)	19 (substituted in)	19 (substituted in)	7	19 (substituted in)	19	2	0	0	0	10
Marnus Schoeman	20 (substituted in)		20 (substituted in)		20 (substituted in)		21 (substituted in)	20 (substituted in)	20 (substituted in)	21 (substituted in)	6	20 (substituted in)	20 (substituted in)	6	21 (substituted in)	20 (substituted in)	20 (substituted in)	20 (substituted in)	20 (substituted in)	16	6	0	0	0	30
Hacjivah Dayimani	21 (substituted in)	20 (substituted in)		23 (substituted in)			8	8	8	8	20 (substituted in)		8	20 (substituted in)	20 (substituted in)			19 (substituted in)		12	0	0	0	0	0
Howard Mnisi	22	22 (substituted in)			22 (substituted in)	22 (substituted in)	22 (substituted in)	22 (substituted in)								23 (substituted in)	23 (substituted in)	23 (substituted in)	23 (substituted in)	9	0	0	0	0	0
Rohan Janse van Rensburg	23 (substituted in)	23 (substituted in)	12	12	14	12			22 (substituted in)	12	22 (substituted in)	22 (substituted in)	12	13						12	4	0	0	0	20
Andries Ferreira		4	4	4			4		4	4		4								7	0	0	0	0	0
Marco Jansen van Vuren		21 (substituted in)	21 (substituted in)		21	9		21 (substituted in)												4	0	0	0	0	0
Madosh Tambwe			23 (substituted in)				11	11	11	11			11	22 (substituted in)						7	7	0	0	0	35
Ashlon Davids				21						23 (substituted in)	21 (substituted in)									2	0	0	0	0	0
Len Massyn					8	20 (substituted in)							19 (substituted in)							3	0	0	0	0	0
Sti Sithole					17											17 (substituted in)				1	0	0	0	0	0
Johannes Jonker					18 (substituted in)	18 (substituted in)		18 (substituted in)		18 (substituted in)	18 (substituted in)	3	18 (substituted in)		18 (substituted in)	18 (substituted in)	18 (substituted in)	18 (substituted in)	18 (substituted in)	12	0	0	0	0	0
Robert Kruger					19 (substituted in)	7														2	0	0	0	0	0
Shaun Reynolds					23 (substituted in)	23 (substituted in)	23 (substituted in)						22 (substituted in)	23 (substituted in)						5	1	0	0	0	5
Dillon Smit						21 (substituted in)	9	9	9	9		21 (substituted in)					21 (substituted in)	21 (substituted in)	21 (substituted in)	9	0	0	0	0	0
Corné Fourie							16 (substituted in)	16 (substituted in)					16 (substituted in)	16 (substituted in)	16 (substituted in)	16 (substituted in)	16 (substituted in)	16 (substituted in)	16 (substituted in)	9	2	0	0	0	10
Ruan Combrinck								14	14	14	14	14	23 (substituted in)	14	14	14	14	14	14	12	5	0	0	0	25
Nic Groom									21 (substituted in)	22 (substituted in)	9	9	9	9	22 (substituted in)	9				8	2	0	0	0	10
Rhyno Herbst														19						0	0	0	0	0	0
Courtnall Skosan															23 (substituted in)	11	22 (substituted in)	22 (substituted in)	11	5	2	0	0	0	10
penalty try																				–	3	–	–	–	21
Total																				19	89	67	11	1	621

(c) denotes the team captain. For each match, the player's squad number is shown. Starting players are numbered 1 to 15, while the replacements are numbered 16 to 22. If a replacement made an appearance in the match, it is indicated by (substituted in) . "App" refers to the number of appearances made by the player, "Try" to the number of tries scored by the player, "Kck" to the number of points scored via kicks (conversions, penalties or drop goals) and "Pts" refer to the total number of points scored by the player.

- Willie Engelbrecht, Jaco Kriel and Christiaan Meyer did not make any appearances.

== See also ==
- Lions
- 2018 Super Rugby season
