= 2013 Varsity Cup =

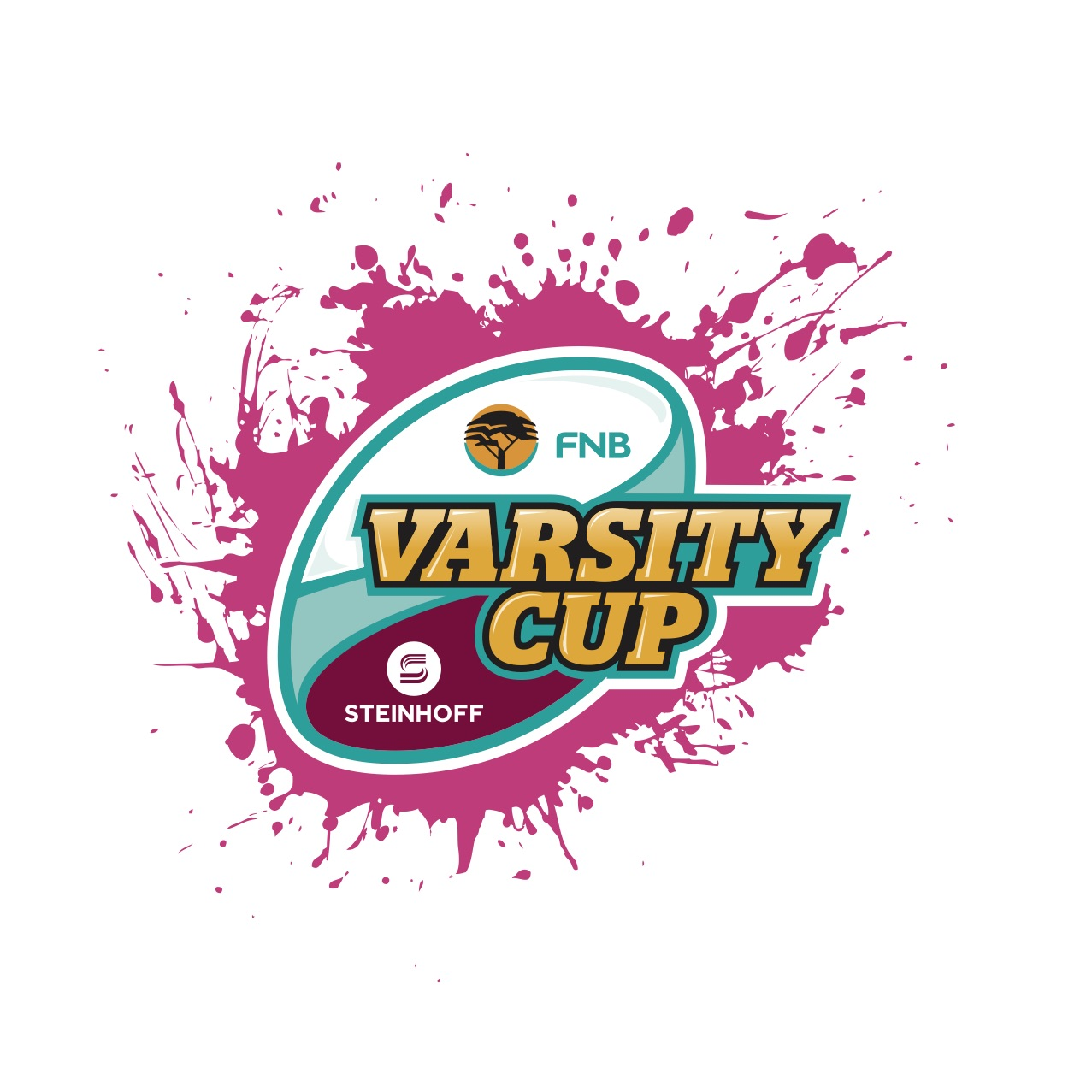
- Countries: South Africa
- Date: 4 February – 8 April 2013
- Champions: UP Tuks (2nd title)
- Runners-up: Maties
- Relegated: None
- Matches played: 31
- Tries scored: 216 (average 7 per match)
- Top point scorer: Kobus de Kock (91)
- Top try scorer: Hoffmann Maritz (7)

The 2013 Varsity Cup was contested from 4 February to 8 April 2013. The tournament (also known as the FNB Varsity Cup presented by Steinhoff International for sponsorship reasons) was the sixth season of the Varsity Cup, an annual inter-university rugby union competition featuring eight South African universities.

The tournament was won by UP Tuks for the second consecutive season; they beat Maties 44–5 in the final played on 8 April 2013. No team was relegated to the second-tier Varsity Shield competition for 2014.

== Competition rules and information ==
There were eight participating universities in the 2013 Varsity Cup. These teams played each other once over the course of the season, either home or away.

Teams received four points for a win and two points for a draw. Bonus points were awarded to teams that scored four or more tries in a game, as well as to teams that lost a match by seven points or less. Teams were ranked by log points, then points difference (points scored less points conceded).

The top four teams qualified for the title play-offs. In the semi-finals, the team that finished first had home advantage against the team that finished fourth, while the team that finished second had home advantage against the team that finished third. The winners of these semi-finals played each other in the final, at the home venue of the higher-placed team.

There was no relegation to the Varsity Shield at the end of the season.

The 2013 Varsity Cup used a different scoring system than the common scoring system. Tries were worth five points as usual, but conversions were worth three points instead of two, while penalties and drop goals were only worth two points instead of three.

== Teams ==
Location of teams in the 2013 Varsity Cup

The following teams took part in the 2013 Varsity Cup competition:

2013 Varsity Cup teams
Team name	University	Stadium
Maties	Stellenbosch University	Danie Craven Stadium, Stellenbosch
NMMU Madibaz	Nelson Mandela Metropolitan University	NMMU Stadium, Port Elizabeth
NWU Pukke	North-West University	Fanie du Toit Sport Ground, Potchefstroom
UCT Ikey Tigers	University of Cape Town	UCT Rugby Fields, Cape Town
UFS Shimlas	University of the Free State	Shimla Park, Bloemfontein
UJ	University of Johannesburg	UJ Stadium, Johannesburg
UP Tuks	University of Pretoria	LC de Villiers Stadium, Pretoria
Wits	University of the Witwatersrand	Wits Rugby Stadium, Johannesburg

== Standings ==
The final league standings for the 2013 Varsity Cup were:

2013 Varsity Cup standings
Pos	Team	P	W	D	L	PF	PA	PD	TF	TA	TB	LB	Pts
1	Maties	7	7	0	0	205	117	+88	28	16	5	0	33
2	UP Tuks	7	4	0	3	179	114	+65	25	13	3	3	22
3	UJ	7	3	1	3	218	179	+39	31	23	5	2	21
4	NMMU Madibaz	7	4	1	2	120	103	+17	14	15	1	2	21
5	NWU Pukke	7	4	0	3	237	222	+15	33	30	4	1	21
6	UFS Shimlas	7	2	2	3	183	132	+51	24	19	2	1	15
7	UCT Ikey Tigers	7	1	2	4	159	198	–39	22	27	2	1	11
8	Wits	7	0	0	7	133	369	–236	17	51	1	0	1

Legend and competition rules
Legend:
Top four teams; qualify to semi-finals.	P = Games played, W = Games won, D = Games drawn, L = Games lost, PF = Points for, PA = Points against, PD = Points difference, TF = Tries For, TA = Tries Against, TB = Try bonus points, LB = Losing bonus points, Pts = Log points
No relegation.	P = Games played, W = Games won, D = Games drawn, L = Games lost, PF = Points for, PA = Points against, PD = Points difference, TF = Tries For, TA = Tries Against, TB = Try bonus points, LB = Losing bonus points, Pts = Log points
Competition rules:
Play-offs: The top four teams qualify to the semi-finals. The first-placed team will host the fourth-placed team and the second-placed team will host the third-placed team. The higher-ranked semi-final winner will then host the lower-ranked semi-final winner in the final. Points breakdown: * 4 points for a win * 2 points for a draw * 1 bonus point for a loss by seven points or less * 1 bonus point for scoring four or more tries in a match

== Pool stages ==
The 2015 Varsity Cup fixtures were released as follows:

- All times are South African (GMT+2).

=== Round one ===
4 February 2013	Maties	29 – 8	UJ	Danie Craven Stadium, Stellenbosch
17:00	Try: Clearance Khumalo 55'; Reniel Hugo 61'; JP Lewis 67', 72'; Con: JH Potgieter 56', 62' (2/2); Dean Grant 73' (1/2)	Report; Scoreboard	Try: AJ le Roux 35'; Con: Kobus de Kock 36' (1/1)	Attendance: 19,800; Referee: Matt Kemp

4 February 2013	NWU Pukke	26 – 23	UP Tuks	Fanie du Toit Sport Ground, Potchefstroom
19:00	Try: Robey Labuschagné 7'; Ernie Strydom 20'; Martin Dreyer 40'; Con: Gerhard Nortier 8', 21', 40' (3/3); Pen: Gerhard Nortier 57' (1/1)	Report; Scoreboard	Try: Vainon Willis 46'; Riaan Britz 50'; Sidney Tobias 61'; Courtnall Skosan 66'; Con: Willie du Plessis (0/2); Tian Schoeman 67' (1/2)	Attendance: 5,520; Referee: Tiaan Jonker

4 February 2013	UCT Ikey Tigers	5 – 5	NMMU Madibaz	UCT Rugby Fields, Cape Town
19:00	Try: David Ambunya 33'; Con: Ross Jones-Davies (0/1); Pen: Ross Jones-Davies (0/1)	Report; Scoreboard	Try: Ulrich Pretorius 42'; Con: Justin van Staden (0/1)	Attendance: 8,600; Referee: Jonathan Kaplan

4 February 2013	Wits	7 – 61	UFS Shimlas	Wits Rugby Stadium, Johannesburg
19:00	Try: Jacques Erasmus 80'; Con: Greg Blom (0/1); Pen: Latiume Fosita 2' (1/2); Bronson Lange (0/1); Cards: Riaan Arends (yellow card) 24' to 35'	Report; Scoreboard	Try: Schalk van der Merwe 5', 25', 40'; Kevin Luiters 36'; Erik le Roux 61'; Oupa Mohojé 67', 74'; Robbie van Schalkwyk 77'; Con: Franna du Toit 6', 25', 37', 40', 61', 67', 74' (7/8)	Attendance: 3,000; Referee: Eduan Nel

=== Round two ===
11 February 2013	UP Tuks	24 – 16	UCT Ikey Tigers	LC de Villiers Stadium, Pretoria
16:50	Try: Jean Cook 5'; Shaun Adendorff 42'; Courtnall Skosan 65'; Con: Tian Schoeman 6', 43' (2/2); Handré Pollard 66' (1/1)	Report; Scoreboard	Try: Michael Willemse 49'; Dillyn Leyds 77'; Con: Ross Jones-Davies 50' (1/1); Dillyn Leyds 78' (1/1); Drop: Nick Holton (0/1)	Attendance: 11,500; Referee: Tiaan Jonker

11 February 2013	NMMU Madibaz	24 – 16	Wits	NMMU Stadium, Port Elizabeth
19:00	Try: Ulrich Pretorius 22'; Louis Fourie 41'; Marius Oosthuizen 78'; Con: Justin van Staden 23', 42', 79' (3/3)	Report; Scoreboard	Try: Carel Greeff 12', 37'; Con: Latiume Fosita 13', 38' (2/2)	Attendance: 2,000; Referee: Rodney Boneparte

11 February 2013	UJ	37 – 20	NWU Pukke	UJ Stadium, Johannesburg
19:00	Try: Malcolm Marx 5', 68'; David Antonites 49'; Shane Kirkwood 53'; JR Esterhuizen 58'; Con: Kobus de Kock 49', 53', 58', 68' (4/5)	Report; Scoreboard	Try: Hoffmann Maritz 19', 83'; Strand Kruger 78'; Con: Gerhard Nortier 19' (1/3); Pen: Gerhard Nortier 31' (1/1); Cards: MB Lusaseni (yellow card) 55' to 65'	Attendance: 5,000; Referee: Lihan Pretorius

11 February 2013	UFS Shimlas	15 – 23	Maties	Shimla Park, Bloemfontein
19:00	Try: Maphutha Dolo 12'; Erik le Roux 43'; Con: Franna du Toit 44' (1/2); Pen: Pieter-Steyn de Wet 62' (1/2); Drop: Maphutha Dolo (0/1); Robbie van Schalkwyk (0/1)	Report; Scoreboard	Try: Reniel Hugo 5'; Helmut Lehmann 26'; Jacobus Jordaan 39'; JP Lewis 74'; Con: Dean Grant 27' (1/4)	Attendance: 8,500; Referee: Jaco Kotze

=== Round three ===
18 February 2013	UFS Shimlas	12 – 23	UP Tuks	Shimla Park, Bloemfontein
16:50	Try: Elandré Huggett 65'; Con: Nico Scheepers 66' (1/1); Pen: Nico Scheepers 2', 15' (2/2); Cards: JC Astle (yellow card) 49' to 59'	Report; Scoreboard	Try: Jean Cook 35', 50'; Clayton Blommetjies 57'; Con: Tian Schoeman 36', 51' (2/3); Pen: Riaan Britz (0/1); Tian Schoeman 22' (1/1); Cards: Bongi Mbonambi (yellow card) 60' to 70'	Attendance: 4,000; Referee: Tiaan Jonker

18 February 2013	Maties	13 – 8	NMMU Madibaz	Danie Craven Stadium, Stellenbosch
19:00	Try: Neethling Gericke 11'; Reniel Hugo 70'; Con: Dean Grant 12' (1/1); JH Potgieter (0/1); Cards: Reniel Hugo (yellow card) 77'	Report; Scoreboard	Try: Ulrich Pretorius 35'; Con: Justin van Staden 36' (1/1)	Attendance: 13,500; Referee: Quinton Immelman

18 February 2013	Wits	25 – 71	NWU Pukke	Wits Rugby Stadium, Johannesburg
19:00	Try: Thato Mavundla 1'; Carel Greeff 9'; Jacques Erasmus 23'; Con: Greg Blom 2', 10' (2/3); Pen: Greg Blom 19', 32' (2/3)	Report; Scoreboard	Try: Hoffmann Maritz 11', 28', 60'; SJ Niemand 15', 82'; Gerhard Nortier 34'; Jaco Grobler 42'; HP Swart 56'; Luther Obi 73', 78'; Con: Gerhard Nortier 16', 42', 56', 60', 74', 79', 83' (7/10)	Attendance: 7,000; Referee: Ben Crouse

18 February 2013	UCT Ikey Tigers	26 – 42	UJ	UCT Rugby Fields, Cape Town
19:00	Try: Michael Willemse 11' penalty try 34'; David Ambunya 49'; Con: Ross Jones-Davies 12', 35', 50' (3/3); Pen: Ross Jones-Davies 17' (1/1)	Report; Scoreboard	Try: Malcolm Marx 20'; Chrysander Botha 22'; Vian van der Watt 45'; Luan Steenkamp 50'; Justin Wheeler 67', 72'; Con: Kobus de Kock 21', 53', 68', 73' (4/4); Divan van Zyl (0/2)	Attendance: 12,000; Referee: Marius van der Westhuizen

=== Round four ===
25 February 2013	Wits	24 – 63	UJ	Wits Rugby Stadium, Johannesburg
16:50	Try: Carel Greeff 24', 53'; Hannes Ludick 40'; Con: Kyle Peyper 25', 40', 54' (3/3)	Report; Scoreboard	Try: Kobus de Kock 6', 26', 45', 55'; JR Esterhuizen 10'; Wiseman Kamanga 19'; Justin Wheeler 39'; AJ le Roux 48'; Chrysander Botha 66'; Con: Divan van Zyl (0/1); Kobus de Kock 20', 27', 40', 46', 56', 67' (6/8)	Attendance: 15,000; Referee: Rasta Rasivhenge

25 February 2013	UP Tuks	16 – 18	Maties	LC de Villiers Stadium, Pretoria
19:00	Try: Juan Schoeman 6' penalty try 25'; Con: Tian Schoeman 7', 25' (2/2)	Report; Scoreboard	Try: James Alexander 22'; Mark Hodgskiss 38'; Con: JH Potgieter 23', 38' (2/2); Pen: Dean Grant 79' (1/1); Cards: Dean Hammond (yellow card) 25' to 35'	Attendance: 14,800; Referee: Ben Crouse

25 February 2013	NWU Pukke	29 – 26	UCT Ikey Tigers	Fanie du Toit Sport Ground, Potchefstroom
19:00	Try: Jaco Grobler 11'; JC Oberholzer 30', 37'; Marius Fourie 63'; Con: Gerhard Nortier 12', 38', 63' (3/4)	Report; Scoreboard	Try: James Kilroe 7'; Dillyn Leyds 22'; Josh Katzen 46'; Sti Sithole 60'; Con: Ross Jones-Davies 8', 46' (2/4)	Attendance: 5,000; Referee: Marius van der Westhuizen

25 February 2013	NMMU Madibaz	14 – 10	UFS Shimlas	NMMU Stadium, Port Elizabeth
19:00	Try: Roy Godfrey 9'; Con: Justin van Staden 10' (1/1); Pen: Justin van Staden 66', 76', 79' (3/3)	Report; Scoreboard	Try: Divandré Strydom 31', 51'; Con: Nico Scheepers (0/2)	Attendance: 1,900; Referee: Lusanda Jam

=== Round five ===
4 March 2013	UCT Ikey Tigers	15 – 37	Maties	UCT Rugby Fields, Cape Town
16:45	Try: Brad Bosman 32'; Tiger Bax 45'; Con: Ross Jones-Davies 33' (1/2); Pen: Ross Jones-Davies 23' (1/1); Cards: Liam Slatem (yellow card) 15' to 25'	Scoreboard	Try: Neethling Gericke 6', 27'; Ryan Nell 50'; Beyers de Villiers 72'; JP Lewis 75'; Con: Dean Grant 28', 51', 73', 76' (4/5)	Referee: Marius van der Westhuizen

4 March 2013	UFS Shimlas	38 – 18	NWU Pukke	Shimla Park, Bloemfontein
19:00	Try: Oupa Mohojé 29'; Renier Botha 48'; Maphutha Dolo 54'; Nico Scheepers 66'; Pieter-Steyn de Wet 71'; Con: Nico Scheepers 30', 49', 67' (3/5); Pen: Nico Scheepers 3', 36' (2/2); Cards: Pieter-Steyn de Wet (yellow card) 40' to 51'	Scoreboard	Try: SW Oosthuizen 45'; Hoffmann Maritz 77'; Sylvian Mahuza 81'; Con: Gerhard Nortier 46' (1/3)	Attendance: 5,000; Referee: Jaco Peyper

4 March 2013	UP Tuks	52 – 0	Wits	LC de Villiers Stadium, Pretoria
19:00	Try: Paul Willemse 8'; Jono Ross 20'; Bongi Mbonambi 22'; Basil Short 32'; Shaun Adendorff 53', 64', 73'; Emile Temperman 61'; Con: Willie du Plessis 9', 23' (2/5); Handré Pollard 61', 64' (2/3); Pen: Willie du Plessis (0/1)	Scoreboard		Attendance: 500; Referee: Jaco Kotze

4 March 2013	NMMU Madibaz	20 – 13	UJ	NMMU Stadium, Port Elizabeth
19:00	Try: Roy Godfrey 1'; Martin Ferreira 31'; Ferdi Gerber 68'; Con: Justin van Staden 32' (1/3); Pen: Justin van Staden 57' (1/1); Gerrit Smith (0/1)	Scoreboard	Try: JR Esterhuizen 14'; Malcolm Marx 51'; Con: Kobus de Kock 52' (1/2)	Attendance: 2,000; Referee: Gerrie de Bruin

=== Round six ===
11 March 2013	NWU Pukke	39 – 36	NMMU Madibaz	Fanie du Toit Sport Ground, Potchefstroom
16:45	Try: JC Oberholzer 20'; Danie Jordaan 37'; Robey Labuschagné 51', 75'; SJ Niemand 61'; Con: Justin Botha (0/1); Tiaan Dorfling 38', 52', 62', 76' (4/4); Pen: Justin Botha (0/1); SW Oosthuizen 79' (1/1)	Scoreboard	Try: Roy Godfrey 5'; Stefan Willemse 33'; Gerrit Smith 40'; Martin Ferreira 46'; Con: Justin van Staden 6', 33', 40', 47' (4/4); Pen: Justin van Staden 24', 43' (2/2)	Referee: Quinton Immelman

11 March 2013	UJ	29 – 34	UP Tuks	UJ Stadium, Johannesburg
19:00	Try: Wessel du Rand 7', 39'; Jacques Pretorius 46'; Kobus de Kock 74'; Con: Kobus de Kock 8', 40', 47' (3/4)	Scoreboard	Try: Clayton Blommetjies 3'; Piet Lindeque 10'; Shaun Adendorff 33'; Courtnall Skosan 78'; Con: Handré Pollard 4', 11', 34', 79' (4/4); Pen: Handré Pollard 32' (1/1)	Referee: Rasta Rasivhenge

11 March 2013	UFS Shimlas	21 – 21	UCT Ikey Tigers	Shimla Park, Bloemfontein
19:00	Try: penalty try 14'; Oupa Mohojé 43'; Divandré Strydom 58'; Con: Nico Scheepers 15', 44' (2/3); Cards: Carl van Heerden (yellow card) 34' to 44'	Scoreboard	Try: Tiger Bax 9', 40'; Brad Bosman 52'; Con: Ross Jones-Davies 10', 40' (2/3); Cards: Jason Klaasen (yellow card) 42' to 53'	Attendance: 3,000; Referee: Lusanda Jam

11 March 2013	Wits	21 – 48	Maties	Wits Rugby Stadium, Johannesburg
19:00	Try: Riaan Arends 9'; Matt Torrance 48'; Rinus Bothma 77'; Con: Kyle Peyper 10', 78' (2/3)	Scoreboard	Try: Helmut Lehmann 2', 30', 44'; Andries Truter 24'; Mark Hodgskiss 60'; Brianton Boysen 75'; Con: Dean Grant 3', 24', 31', 45' (4/4); JH Potgieter 60', 76' (2/2)	Attendance: 3,000; Referee: Pro Legoete

=== Round seven ===
18 March 2013	UJ	26 – 26	UFS Shimlas	UJ Stadium, Johannesburg
16:45	Try: Jacques Pretorius 3'; AJ le Roux 67'; Vian van der Watt 78', 80'; Con: Kobus de Kock (0/1); Guy Cronjé 79', 81' (2/3)	Scoreboard	Try: JJ de Klerk 34'; Charles Marais 47'; Kevin Luiters 55'; Con: Nico Scheepers 35', 48', 56' (3/3); Pen: Nico Scheepers 43' (1/1); Cards: Armandt Koster (yellow card) 75'	Referee: Pieter Janse van Vuuren

18 March 2013	Maties	37 – 34	NWU Pukke	Danie Craven Stadium, Stellenbosch
19:00	Try: Clearance Khumalo 5'; Os Hamman 26'; Charl de Villiers 34'; Craig Barry 44'; Ryan Nell 57'; Con: JH Potgieter 6', 27', 35', 58' (4/5)	Scoreboard	Try: HP Swart 53'; Sylvian Mahuza 64'; Hoffmann Maritz 72'; Luther Obi 77', 80'; Con: Tiaan Dorfling 65', 73' (2/4); SW Oosthuizen 81' (1/1)	Referee: François Groenewald

18 March 2013	NMMU Madibaz	13 – 7	UP Tuks	NMMU Stadium, Port Elizabeth
19:00	Try: Martin Ferreira 26'; Con: Justin van Staden (0/1); Pen: Gerrit Smith (0/1); Justin van Staden 32', 50', 59', 70' (4/6)	Scoreboard	Try: Jaco Visagie 71'; Con: Willie du Plessis (0/1); Pen: Handré Pollard 51' (1/1); Cards: Piet Lindeque (yellow card) 58' to 68'	Attendance: 5,500; Referee: Daniel Fortuin

18 March 2013	UCT Ikey Tigers	50 – 40	Wits	UCT Rugby Fields, Cape Town
19:00	Try: Brad Bosman 3'; Tiger Bax 10', 71'; Richard Stewart 27'; Michael Willemse 31'; Liam Slatem 34', 36'; Con: Ross Jones-Davies 4', 11', 32', 35', 72' (5/7); Cards: Brad Bosman (red card) 28'	Scoreboard	Try: Charlie Baggot 50'; Jason Fraser 55', 59'; Riaan Arends 74'; Greg Blom 79'; Con: Kyle Peyper 51', 56', 60', 75', 79' (5/5); Cards: Carel Greeff (yellow card) 28' to 38'	Referee: Quinton Immelman

== Play-offs ==
Semi-final
25 March 2013
UP Tuks	61
UJ	24
25 March 2013
Maties	16
NMMU Madibaz	15

Final
8 April 2013
Maties	05
UP Tuks	44

=== Semi-finals ===
25 March 2013
16:30

UP Tuks	61 – 24	UJ
Try: penalty try 5'; Jono Ross 15'; Handré Pollard 17'; Mike Williams 21'; Clayton Blommetjies 25'; Willie du Plessis 30', 54'; Courtnall Skosan 50'; Con: Handré Pollard 6', 16', 18', 22', 26', 31', 55' (7/8)	Scoreboard	Try: Chrysander Botha 11'; Jacques Pretorius 45'; Vian van der Watt 60'; Con: Kobus de Kock 12', 46', 61' (3/3)

LC de Villiers Stadium, Pretoria
Referee: Tiaan Jonker

25 March 2013
19:00

Maties	16 – 15	NMMU Madibaz
Try: penalty try 36'; James Alexander 64'; Con: JH Potgieter 37', 65' (2/2)	Scoreboard	Try: Brian Shabangu 61'; Jarryd Buys 72'; Martin Ferreira 77'; Con: Justin van Staden (0/1); Gerrit Smith (0/2); Pen: Logan Basson (0/1); Cards: Dwayne Kelly (yellow card) 35' to 44'; Stefan Willemse (yellow card) 36' to 45'

Danie Craven Stadium, Stellenbosch
Referee: Ben Crouse

=== Final ===
8 April 2013
19:00

Maties	5 – 44	UP Tuks
Try: Clearance Khumalo 57'; Con: JH Potgieter (0/1)	Scoreboard"	Try: Danie Faasen 15'; Willie du Plessis 20'; Jono Ross 36'; Courtnall Skosan 47'; Vainon Willis 77'; Con: Handré Pollard 16', 21', 37', 48', 78' (5/5); Pen: Handré Pollard 60' (1/1); Drop: Clayton Blommetjies 72' (1/1)

Danie Craven Stadium, Stellenbosch
Attendance: 20,000
Referee: Marius van der Westhuizen

Maties	Tuks

FB	15	Craig Barry
RW	14	Clearance Khumalo
OC	13	Mark Hodgkiss
IC	12	Ryan Nell
LW	11	Dean Hammond
FH	10	JH Potgieter
SH	9	James Alexander
N8	8	Reniel Hugo
OF	7	Lungelo Chonco
BF	6	Helmut Lehmann (c)
RL	5	Wilhelm van der Sluys
LL	4	Jan de Klerk
TP	3	Os Hamman
HK	2	Charl de Villiers
LP	1	Alister Vermaak
Replacements:
	16	Frederik Kirsten
	17	Neil Oelofse
	18	Reuben Johannes
	19	Beyers de Villiers
	20	Jean Nel
	21	Dean Grant
	22	JP Lewis
	23	Brendan Pitzer
Coach:
Hawies Fourie

FB	15	Clayton Blommetjies
RW	14	Vainon Willis
OC	13	Piet Lindeque
IC	12	Handre Pollard
LW	11	Courtnall Skosan
FH	10	Willie du Plessis
SH	9	Danie Faasen
N8	8	Jono Ross (c)
OF	7	Jacques Verwey
BF	6	Shaun Adendorff
RL	5	Marvin Orie
LL	4	Mike Williams
TP	3	Basil Short
HK	2	Mbongeni Mbonambi
LP	1	Juan Schoeman
Replacements:
	16	Jaco Visagie
	17	Sabelo Nhlapo
	18	Schalk Van Heerden
	19	Wiaan Liebenberg
	20	Emile Temperman
	21	Christopher Bosch
	22	Riaan Britz
	23	Christoph Gouws
Coach:
Nico Luus

Player of the Match:
Not documented UP Tuks

Assistant referees:
Lusanda Jam & Cwengile Jadezweni (South Africa), Jaco Kotze (South Africa)

Television match official:
Deon van Blommestein (South Africa)

== Honours ==
The honour roll for the 2013 Varsity Cup was as follows:

2013 Varsity Cup Honours
Champions:	UP Tuks (2nd title)
Player That Rocks:	Oupa Mohojé, UFS Shimlas
Forward That Rocks:	Reniel Hugo, Maties
Back That Rocks:	Howard Mnisi, NMMU Madibaz
Top Try Scorers:	Hoffmann Maritz, NWU Pukke (7)
Top Points Scorer:	Kobus de Kock, UJ (91)

== Players ==
=== Squad lists ===
The teams released the following squad lists:

Maties

Forwards

- Brianton Booysen
- Lungelo Chonco
- Nick de Jager
- Jan de Klerk
- Beyers de Villiers
- Charl de Villiers
- Neethling Gericke
- Os Hamman
- Reniel Hugo
- Reuben Johannes
- Frederick Kirsten
- Helmut Lehmann
- Niel Oelofse
- Brandon Pitzer
- Jurg Streicher
- Hein van der Merwe
- Wilhelm van der Sluys
- Jurie van Vuuren
- Alistair Vermaak
- Did not play:
- Schalk Ferreira
- Attie Joubert
- Boeta Kleinhans
- Hugo Kloppers
- Basil Liebenberg
- Derick Linde
- Cameron Lindsay
- Alfred Ries
- Erik van Zyl

Backs

- James Alexander
- Craig Barry
- Hayden de Villiers
- Dean Grant
- Dean Hammond
- Mark Hodgskiss
- Louis Jordaan
- Clearance Khumalo
- JP Lewis
- Jean Nel
- Ryan Nell
- JH Potgieter
- Warren Seals
- Andries Truter
- Did not play:
- Rob Ahlers
- Jarryd Buys
- Wessel Coetzee
- Jan de Wet
- Gerhard Jordaan
- Johnny Kôtze
- Pieter Peens
- Caleb Smith
- Gideon Strydom
- Nico van der Westhuizen
- Christof van Tonder
- Devon Williams

Coach

- Chris Rossouw

NMMU Madibaz

Forwards

- Tim Agaba
- Francois Coetzer
- Albé de Swardt
- Dexter Fahey
- Martin Ferreira
- Louis Fourie
- Ferdi Gerber
- Roy Godfrey
- Lizo Gqoboka
- Gareth Hartley
- Elrich Kock
- Schalk Oelofse
- Brenden Olivier
- Marius Oosthuizen
- Ulrich Pretorius
- Brian Shabangu
- Stefan Willemse
- Mzwanele Zito
- Did not play:
- Chad Banfield
- Reece Dabner
- Hannes Huisamen
- Marius le Roux
- Rob Louw
- Francois Nel

Backs

- Logan Basson
- Jarryd Buys
- Dwayne Kelly
- Devon Lailvaux
- Lesley Luiters
- Howard Mnisi
- Mayibuye Ndwandwa
- Yamkela Ngam
- Foxy Ntleki
- Brian Skosana
- Gerrit Smith
- Billy van Lill
- Justin van Staden
- Did not play:
- Ruan Allerston
- Drew du Toit
- Andile Jho
- Bradley Kretzmann
- Louis Kruger
- Charlie Purdon
- Marlin Ruiters
- Shane Swart
- Phumezo Orlando Tom
- Kayle van Zyl

Coach

- Brent Janse van Rensburg

NWU Pukke

Forwards

- Herman Basson
- Molotsi Bouwer
- Stompie de Wet
- Martin Dreyer
- Arno Ebersohn
- Marius Fourie
- Marcel Groenewald
- Danie Jordaan
- Strand Kruger
- Robey Labuschagné
- MB Lusaseni
- Mash Mafela
- SJ Niemand
- JC Oberholzer
- Pens Scharneck
- Solly Sotsaka
- Ernie Strydom
- HP Swart
- Akker van der Merwe
- Elardus Venter
- Did not play:
- Bok Barnard
- Wian Fourie
- Pikkie Nortjé
- Chris Schoonraad
- Lodewyk Uys
- Peet van der Walt
- JC Wasserman

Backs

- Rowayne Beukman
- Justin Botha
- Lucian Cupido
- Johan Deysel
- Tiaan Dorfling
- Jaco Grobler
- Sylvian Mahuza
- Hoffmann Maritz
- Gerhard Nortier
- Luther Obi
- Wynand Olivier
- SW Oosthuizen
- Hennie Skorbinski
- Pieter Smith
- Did not play:
- Kobus du Plessis
- Janus Jonker
- Rudolph Stephanus Muller
- Heinrich Smith

Coach

- Hannes Esterhuizen

UCT Ikey Tigers

Forwards

- Derek Asbun
- Brad Bosman
- Mike Botha
- Joel Carew
- Johno de Klerk
- Dayne Jans
- Josh Katzen
- Oli Kebble
- James Kilroe
- Jason Klaasen
- Kyle Kriel
- Shaun McDonald
- Shane Meier
- Darryl Ndjadila
- Levi Odendaal
- Neil Rautenbach
- Ntsolo Setlaba
- Sti Sithole
- Digby Webb
- Michael Willemse
- Did not play:
- Stephen Buerger
- Deacon Chowles
- André Mark du Plessis
- Matthew Faught
- Vince Jobo
- Timmy Louw
- Peter Olivier
- Gareth Topkin
- Francois van Wyk

Backs

- David Ambunya
- Tiger Bax
- Paul Cohen
- Justin Coles
- Nick Holton
- Ross Jones-Davies
- Dillyn Leyds
- Nico Loizides
- Nate Nel
- Dylan Sage
- Ricky Schroeder
- Liam Slatem
- Richard Stewart
- Lihleli Xoli
- Did not play:
- Darryn Berry
- Tonderai Chigumadzi
- Ryan Dugmore
- Nick Farrar
- Dylon Frylinck
- Selom Gavor
- Jason Germishuys
- Kyle Lombard
- Robbie Louw
- Steve Wallace

Coach

- Kevin Foote

UFS Shimlas

Forwards

- JC Astle
- Luan de Bruin
- Wickus Deysel
- Jacques du Toit
- Elandré Huggett
- Niell Jordaan
- Armandt Koster
- Erik le Roux
- Charles Marais
- Oupa Mohojé
- Freddy Ngoza
- Nick Schonert
- Tyron Schultz
- Vaatjie van der Merwe
- Schalk van der Merwe
- Fanie van der Walt
- Carl van Heerden
- JC van Wyk
- Henco Venter
- Lebo Zietsman
- Did not play:
- Neil Claassen
- Curtley de Kock
- Boxer de Villiers
- Heinrich Renoir Douglas
- Joubert Horn
- Barend Koortzen
- De Wet Kruger
- Pieter Matthee
- Justin Pappin
- Boom Prinsloo
- Egbert Ras
- Adriaan Schoeman

Backs

- Renier Botha
- JJ de Klerk
- Pieter-Steyn de Wet
- Maphutha Dolo
- Franna du Toit
- Reinhardt Erwee
- Kay-Kay Hlongwane
- Kevin Luiters
- Marco Mason
- Nico Scheepers
- Thys Smit
- Earl Snyman
- Divandré Strydom
- Sethu Tom
- Stephan van der Merwe
- Robbie van Schalkwyk
- Did not play:
- AJ Coertzen
- Erick Colyn
- Marnus Marais
- Niel Marais
- Pieter Rademan
- Lance Ruthford
- Vink van der Walt

Coach

- Michael Horak

UJ

Forwards

- David Antonites
- Fabian Booysen
- Van Zyl Botha
- Steph de Witt
- Wessel du Rand
- Wiseman Kamanga
- Shane Kirkwood
- AJ le Roux
- RJ Liebenberg
- Thiliphatu Marole
- Malcolm Marx
- Njabulo Mkize
- Kobus Porter
- Johan van der Hoogt
- Erasmus van der Linde
- Ewald van der Westhuizen
- Justin Wheeler
- Did not play:
- Ian Barnard
- Henri Boshoff
- Daneel Ellis
- Lourens Erasmus
- Mitchell Hildebrand
- Henru Liebenberg
- Gareth Milasinovich
- Stephan Nel
- Dylan Peterson
- Sean Pretorius
- Jannes Snyman
- Griffith van Wyk
- Wimpie Wentzel

Backs

- Chrysander Botha
- Guy Cronjé
- Tommy Damba
- Kobus de Kock
- JR Esterhuizen
- Lincoln Koopman
- Bradley Moolman
- Andries Oosthuizen
- Jacques Pretorius
- Luan Steenkamp
- Vian van der Watt
- Divan van Zyl
- Lukas van Zyl
- Adrian Vermeulen
- PJ Walters
- Did not play:
- Michael John Bean
- Chuma Sean Faas
- Thato Thomas Marobela
- Lucien Kirk Ruiters
- Marais Schmidt
- Ethan Charles Searle
- Dauw Steyn

tbc

- James Craig Bester
- Devlin Hope
- Johannes Olivier
- Cornelius Francois Vermeulen

Coach

- Hugo van As

UP Tuks

Forwards

- Shaun Adendorff
- Andrew Beerwinkel
- Jean Cook
- Jacques du Plessis
- Frederic Eksteen
- Christoph Gouws
- Wesley Kotzé
- Wiaan Liebenberg
- Bongi Mbonambi
- JP Mostert
- Sabelo Nhlapo
- Marvin Orie
- Stephan Pretorius
- Jono Ross
- Juan Schoeman
- Basil Short
- Sidney Tobias
- Nardus van der Walt
- Schalk van Heerden
- Hencus van Wyk
- Jacques Verwey
- Jaco Visagie
- Paul Willemse
- Mike Williams
- Did not play:
- Zane Botha
- Clyde Davids
- Gerhard Engelbrecht
- Victor Hechter
- Irné Herbst
- Jono Janse van Rensburg
- Dennis Visser

Backs

- Clayton Blommetjies
- Christopher Bosch
- Riaan Britz
- Willie du Plessis
- Danie Faasen
- Lohan Jacobs
- Piet Lindeque
- Burger Odendaal
- Handré Pollard
- Tian Schoeman
- Courtnall Skosan
- William Small-Smith
- Clayton Stewart
- Emile Temperman
- Vainon Willis
- Did not play:
- Travis Ismaiel
- Jesse Kriel
- Donnovan Marais
- Sampie Mastriet
- Damian van Wyk

Coach

- Nollis Marais

Wits

Forwards

- Rory Anderson
- Charlie Baggot
- Rinus Bothma
- Piers Cooper
- Jason Fraser
- Carel Greeff
- JP Jonck
- Ferdinand Kelly
- KK Kgame
- Shai Korb
- Jeremiah Latana
- Hannes Ludick
- Wandile Lupuwane
- Thato Mavundla
- Devin Montgomery
- Katlego Ntsie
- Luvuyo Pupuma
- Cameron Shafto
- Pieter van Biljon
- Bradley van Niekerk
- Phaka Zuma
- Did not play:
- Chad Erasmus
- Sam Peter
- Rendani Ramovha
- Juandré Venter

Backs

- Riaan Arends
- Greg Blom
- Brent Crossley
- Mandla Dube
- Josh Durbach
- Jacques Erasmus
- Kayde Fisher
- Latiume Fosita
- Nkuli Gamede
- Bronson Lange
- Jared Meyer
- Ish Nkolo
- Kyle Peyper
- Michael Sephton-Poultney
- Matt Torrance
- Did not play:
- Kenneth du Plessis
- Juan Petrus du Toit
- Grant Janke
- Andrew Keightley-Smith
- Juandré Wurth

Coach

- Andy Royle

== See also ==
- Varsity Cup
- 2013 Varsity Rugby
- 2013 Varsity Shield
- 2013 SARU Community Cup
- 2013 Vodacom Cup
