= Piet Lindeque =

South African rugby union player

- Full name: Petrus Johannes Lindeque
- Born: 31 January 1991 (age 35) Winburg, South Africa
- Height: 1.82 m (5 ft 11 1/2 in)
- Weight: 88 kg (13 st 12 lb; 194 lb)
- School: Grey College, Bloemfontein

Rugby union career
- Position: Centre
Youth career
- 2007–2009: Free State Cheetahs
- 2010–2012: Sharks
Amateur team(s)
Years	Team	Apps	(Points)
2013	UP Tuks	7	(5)
Senior career
Years	Team	Apps	(Points)
2010–2012	Sharks (Currie Cup)	10	(20)
2013	Blue Bulls	1	(5)
2013	Sharks	5	(5)
2013	Free State Cheetahs	6	(0)
- Correct as of 20 October 2013
International career
Years	Team	Apps	(Points)
2009	S.A. Schools		
- Correct as of 11 May 2013

Petrus Johannes Lindeque (31 January 1991) is a retired South African rugby union player. He played for the Sharks, Blue Bulls and Free State Cheetahs and also made five Super Rugby appearances for the Sharks. His regular position was centre.

== Career ==
=== Youth rugby ===
He represented his local team, the Free State Cheetahs at several youth weeks, such as the Under–16 Grant Khomo Week in 2007 and the Under–18 Craven Week in 2008 and 2009, which led to a call-up to the S.A. Schools team in 2009.

=== Sharks ===
He joined the Sharks academy the following season and made his first class debut for a Sharks Invitational XV against the Falcons in the Compulsory Friendly series ahead of the 2010 Currie Cup Premier Division.

He made several appearances for the Under–19 and Under–21 teams of the Sharks over the next few seasons, as well as a further nine first class appearances.

=== Blue Bulls / Tuks ===
He joined the Blue Bulls in 2013 and represented them in the 2013 Vodacom Cup, as well as playing for UP Tuks in the 2013 Varsity Cup.

=== Sharks ===
He returned to Durban a few months later, however, when was named as a surprise inclusion in the Sharks touring squad for the 2013 Super Rugby season. He made a total of five appearances during the competition, scoring one try.

=== Free State Cheetahs ===
He then joined the Free State Cheetahs in time for the 2013 Currie Cup Premier Division season. He made just six appearances in the competition and none at all in the 2014 Super Rugby and 2014 Vodacom Cup competition to due a persistent knee injury. In June 2014, the Cheetahs agreed to release Lindeque from the remainder of his contract as he decided to retire, aged 23, to pursue a future in farming.
