= Hoffmann Maritz =

South African rugby union player

- Full name: Hoffmann van Heerden Maritz
- Born: 29 March 1989 (age 37) Bethlehem, South Africa
- Height: 1.84 m (6 ft 1/2 in)
- Weight: 96 kg (15 st 2 lb; 212 lb)
- School: Bethlehem Voortrekker High School
- University: NWU Pukke

Rugby union career
- Position: Fullback / Winger / Centre
- Current team: Pumas
Youth career
- 2007–2008: Griffons
- 2009–2010: Free State Cheetahs
Amateur team(s)
Years	Team	Apps	(Points)
2013–2014	NWU Pukke	11	(40)
Senior career
Years	Team	Apps	(Points)
2011	Golden Lions XV	5	(0)
2011–2014	Leopards	37	(80)
2013	Leopards XV	4	(5)
2015–2016	Pumas	20	(15)
- Correct as of 9 October 2016
International career
Years	Team	Apps	(Points)
2012	South African Barbarians (North)	1	(0)
2013	South African Universities	1	(0)
- Correct as of 31 May 2013

Hoffmann van Heerden Maritz (born 29 March 1989) is a South African rugby union player who most recently played for the Pumas. He is a utility back that can play as full-back, winger or centre.

== Career ==
=== Youth rugby ===
He started his career playing at youth level for the Griffons at the 2007 Under-18 Craven Week and at Under-19 level the following season. He then spent the next two years playing for Free State Cheetahs at Under-19 and Under-21 level.

=== Senior rugby ===
In 2011, he had a short spell at the Golden Lions, where he made his first class debut in a 2011 Vodacom Cup match againstWestern Province, which ended in an 18-18 draw.

For the 2011 Currie Cup Premier Division season, he joined the Leopards, where he quickly established himself as a first team regular.

He joined Nelspruit-based side Pumas for the 2015 season.

=== Representative rugby ===
He was selected for the South African Barbarians (North) team against England that toured South Africa as part of the 2012 mid-year rugby test series.

He played Varsity Cup rugby for the NWU Pukke in 2013, which led to his inclusion in the 2013 South African Universities team.

Later in 2013, he was included in a South Africa President's XV team to play in the 2013 IRB Tbilisi Cup, but later withdrew due to a knee injury.
