= MB Lusaseni =

South African rugby union player

- Full name: Luvuyiso Lusaseni
- Born: 16 December 1988 (age 37) East London, South Africa
- Height: 1.95 m (6 ft 5 in)
- Weight: 106 kg (16 st 10 lb; 234 lb)
- School: Selborne College
- University: Ethekwini College; University of Pretoria

Rugby union career
- Position: Lock / Flanker
- Current team: Sharks XV
Youth career
- 2004–2006: Border Bulldogs
- 2007–2008: Sharks
Amateur team(s)
Years	Team	Apps	(Points)
2011	UP Tuks	7	(0)
2013	NWU Pukke	7	(0)
Senior career
Years	Team	Apps	(Points)
2009–2010	Sharks XV	11	(5)
2010	→ Griquas	3	(0)
2011–2013	Leopards	43	(10)
2013	Leopards XV	4	(0)
2014	Lions	14	(0)
2014–2016	Golden Lions	16	(0)
2015–2016	Golden Lions XV	11	(5)
2019	Sharks XV	3	(0)
2009–2019	Total	105	(20)
- Correct as of 7 July 2019
International career
Years	Team	Apps	(Points)
2006	South Africa Schools		
2008	South Africa Under-20	1	(0)
2012	South African Barbarians (North)	1	(0)
2013	South African Universities	1	(0)
- Correct as of 8 May 2013

Luvuyiso 'MB' Lusaseni (born 16 December 1988) is a former South African rugby union player for the Sharks XV in the Rugby Challenge. He played first class rugby between 2009 and 2016, making in excess of 100 appearances. His regular position is lock or flanker and he played for the Lions in Super Rugby and for the Sharks, Griquas, Leopards and Golden Lions domestically.

He also played representative rugby for South Africa Schools in 2006, South Africa Under-20 in 2008, the South African Barbarians in 2012 and the South African Universities team in 2013. He retired from rugby union at the end of 2016 to concentrate on the production of his own craft beer.

== Career ==
He started playing for the Border Bulldogs and represented them at Under–16 and Under–18 level between 2004 and 2006. He earned a call-up to the S.A. Schools team in 2006 and also joined the Sharks academy in 2007. The following year, he was included in the South Africa Under-20 team for the 2008 IRB Junior World Championship.

He made his first class debut in the 2009 Vodacom Cup against a Free State XV. A few further games followed over the next year before he had a short spell with the Griquas during the 2010 Currie Cup Premier Division.

In 2011, he joined the Leopards, where he established himself as a first choice player.

He joined the Golden Lions for the 2014 season.

He also represented Varsity Cup teams UP Tuks in 2011 and NWU Pukke in 2013 and was named in a South African Universities team that played against Namibia in 2013.
