= Stefan Willemse =

South African rugby union footballer

- Born: 12 April 1992 (age 34) Paarl, South Africa
- Height: 1.94 m (6 ft 4 1/2 in)
- Weight: 114 kg (251 lb; 17 st 13 lb)
- School: Paarl Gimnasium

Rugby union career
- Position: Flanker / Lock
- Current team: Eastern Province Elephants
Youth career
- 2011: Blue Bulls U19
- 2012: Sharks U21
- 2013: Eastern Province U21
Amateur team(s)
Years	Team	Apps	(Points)
2013–2014	NMMU Madibaz	16	(5)
Senior career
Years	Team	Apps	(Points)
2013–2015	Eastern Province Kings	42	(40)
2016–2017	Southern Kings	19	(0)
2016	Western Province	4	(0)
2017	Eastern Province Kings	3	(5)
2017–2019	Pumas	33	(20)
2020	Rugby ATL	5	(0)
2020–2021	Griquas	18	(0)
2022–	Eastern Province Elephants		
- Correct as of 29 March 2022

Stefan Willemse (born 12 April 1992) is a South African professional rugby union player for the Pumas in the Currie Cup and in the Rugby Challenge. His regular position is flanker or lock.

== Career ==
=== Youth and Varsity rugby ===
Willemse played for the Blue Bulls U19 side during the 2011 Under-19 Provincial Championship competition, which saw the side progress to the final, where they lost to the Golden Lions U19. He moved to Durban in 2012 to join the Sharks. He made just three substitute appearances for the Sharks U21 side in the 2012 Under-21 Provincial Championship competition, with an ankle injury curtailing his progress.

Willemse then made the move to Port Elizabeth, where he joined Varsity Cup side NMMU Madibaz. He was a key player for the team during the 2013 and 2014, helping them reach the semi-finals of the competition on both occasions.

He also made a single appearance for the Eastern Province U21 side in their promotion/relegation play-off match against the Border U21 side, but could not help the team win promotion to Division A.

=== Eastern Province Kings ===
At the conclusion of the 2013 Varsity Cup, Willemse was included in the Eastern Province Kings squad for the 2013 Vodacom Cup, and made his first class debut against SWD Eagles. He scored his first try in his next match, a 27–23 victory over the Sharks XV After a third substitute appearance in the next match against the Boland Cavaliers – with Willemse once again scoring in a 27–23 victory – he started his first senior match in the EP Kings' quarter final match against the Blue Bulls, scoring a try in his third consecutive match to help the EP Kings to a dramatic 34–31 victory. He made his second start in their 39–13 semi-final loss to the Pumas in Nelspruit.

He was retained for the senior side when the 2013 Currie Cup First Division season kicked off, making his first Currie Cup appearance in the opening fixture, when he started the match against the Pumas. He made a total of seven starts and four substitute appearances during the campaign, scoring five tries during the campaign (two in each of their matches against the Leopards and the Falcons and one more against the Boland Cavaliers), helping the EP Kings to second place in the competition and subsequently winning promotion to the 2014 Currie Cup Premier Division.

He made two appearances for the Kings during the 2014 Vodacom Cup, as the Kings finished fifth in the Southern Section to miss out on a play-off spot. In June 2014, he was selected on the bench for the Eastern Province Kings side to face Wales during their 2014 tour of South Africa. He came on just before the hour mark as the Kings suffered a 12–34 defeat. He made his debut in the Premier Division of the Currie Cup during the 2014 season; he started their opening match of the season against Western Province in Port Elizabeth and played in the first eight rounds of the competition before an AC joint injury ruled him out of the last two rounds.
