= Freddy Ngoza =

South African rugby union player

- Full name: Thato Frederick Ntandyenkosi Ngoza
- Born: 20 October 1991 (age 35) Piet Retief, South Africa
- Height: 1.90 m (6 ft 3 in)
- Weight: 105 kg (231 lb; 16 st 7 lb)
- School: Volksrust High School
- University: University of the Free State

Rugby union career
- Position: Flanker / No 8 / Lock
- Current team: Leopards
Youth career
- 2008–2009: Pumas
- 2010: Griffons
- 2011: Free State Cheetahs
Amateur team(s)
| Years | Team | Apps | (Points) |
| 2011–2013 | UFS Shimlas | 14 | (0) |
Senior career
| Years | Team | Apps | (Points) |
| 2011 | Griffons | 2 | (0) |
| 2013–2015 | Free State Cheetahs | 12 | (5) |
| 2013–2015 | Free State XV | 7 | (5) |
| 2013 | → Griffons | 5 | (5) |
| 2015 | → Griffons | 6 | (0) |
| 2016–2017 | Blue Bulls XV | 13 | (5) |
| 2017 | Blue Bulls | 1 | (0) |
| 2017–2018 | Eastern Province Elephants | 4 | (0) |
| 2017–2018 | Southern Kings | 3 | (0) |
| 2018 | Boland Cavaliers | 1 | (0) |
| 2019 | VVA Saracens | | |
| 2021 | Falcons | 4 | (5) |
| 2022– | Leopards | | |
- Correct as of 27 March 2022

Thato Frederick Ntandyenkosi Ngoza (born 20 October 1991) is a South African professional rugby union player who last played for the Falcons (rugby union) in the Currie Cup and the Rugby Challenge. His regular position is as a loose-forward or a lock.

== Career ==
=== Youth ===
He represented the Pumas at the 2008 Under–18 Academy Week and the 2009 Under–18 Craven Week tournaments. He then joined the Griffons and played for the Griffons U19 team in the 2010 Under-19 Provincial Championship tournament.

=== Griffons ===
He was included in the Griffons side for the 2011 Vodacom Cup competition and made his debut when he started in a 60–0 defeat to Western Province. He also featured the following match against the Free State Cheetahs.

=== Free State Cheetahs ===
He played for the Free State U21 side in the 2011 Under-21 Provincial Championship and 2012 Under-21 Provincial Championship competitions. In 2013, he was included in the Free State XV Vodacom Cup side and made two substitute appearances, also scoring a last-minute try in their match against the Sharks XV

He was included in their squad for the 2013 Currie Cup Premier Division, but actually made his Currie Cup debut during a loan spell at former side Griffons, coming on as a substitute against the Border Bulldogs.

=== Blue Bulls ===
Ngoza signed a deal with Pretoria-based side the Blue Bulls for the 2016 and 2017 seasons.

=== Varsity Cup ===
Ngoza also played Varsity Cup rugby for UFS Shimlas, representing them in the 2011, 2012 and 2013 seasons.

== Statistics ==
As of 31 August 2015.

First class career
| Season | Teams | Super Rugby | | Currie Cup | | Vodacom Cup | | Other | | Total | |
| Season | Teams | Apps | Pts | Apps | Pts | Apps | Pts | Apps | Pts | Apps | Pts |
|---|---|---|---|---|---|---|---|---|---|---|---|
| 2011 | Griffons | — | — | — | — | 2 | 0 | — | — | 2 | 0 |
| 2013 | Free State Cheetahs | — | — | 4 | 0 | 2 | 5 | — | — | 6 | 5 |
| 2013 | Griffons | — | — | 5 | 5 | — | — | — | — | 5 | 5 |
| 2015 | Free State Cheetahs | — | — | 2 | 0 | 5 | 0 | — | — | 7 | 0 |
| 2015 | Griffons | — | — | 6 | 0 | — | — | — | — | 6 | 0 |
| Griffons Total | | — | — | 11 | 5 | 2 | 0 | — | — | 13 | 5 |
| Free State Cheetahs Total | | — | — | 6 | 0 | 7 | 5 | — | — | 13 | 5 |
| Career Total | | — | — | 17 | 5 | 9 | 5 | — | — | 26 | 10 |
