= Luan de Bruin =

South African rugby union player

- Born: 13 February 1993 (age 33) Pretoria, South Africa
- Height: 1.83 m (6 ft 0 in)
- Weight: 128 kg (20 st 2 lb; 282 lb)
- School: Afrikaanse Hoër Seunskool
- Notable relative: Marlize de Bruin (sister)

Rugby union career
- Position: Prop
- Current team: Newcastle Red Bulls
Senior career
Years	Team	Apps	(Points)
2014–2018	Free State XV	13	(0)
2014–2020	Cheetahs	37	(10)
2014–2020	Free State Cheetahs	32	(0)
2020–2021	Leicester Tigers	17	(0)
2021–2024	Edinburgh Rugby	25	(5)
2024–	Newcastle	12	(0)
- Correct as of 8 August 2025
International career
Years	Team	Apps	(Points)
2013	South Africa Under-20	4	(5)
- Correct as of 22 April 2018

Luan de Bruin (born 13 February 1993 in Pretoria, South Africa) is a South African rugby union player who currently plays for Newcastle Red Bulls in the Gallagher Premiership.

== Career ==
=== Youth and Varsity Cup rugby ===
De Bruin got recognised for provincial selection at primary school level in 2006, when he was included in the Blue Bulls Under-13 squad that played at the Craven Week competition. In 2009, he was selected in their Under-16 Grant Khomo Week squad and he played at the Under-18 Craven Week competitions in both 2010 and 2011. After the 2011 tournament, he was included in a South African Academy side that played against a France Under-18 side in Durban.

In 2012, De Bruin moved to Bloemfontein. He made eleven appearances for the Free State U19 side during the 2012 Under-19 Provincial Championship, starting ten of those matches. At the start of the 2013 season, he played for university side UFS Shimlas during the 2013 Varsity Cup competition, where he made six substitute appearances.

He was selected in the South African Under-20 side that played in the 2013 IRB Junior World Championship in France. He started in their first two pool matches, a 97–0 victory over the United States and a 31–24 victory over eventual champions England. He didn't feature in their match against hosts France, but was restored to the starting line-up in their semi-final clash with Wales, where South Africa suffered an 18–17 defeat. He was also in the run-on side that met New Zealand in the third-placed play-off and De Bruin scored one of six South African tries as they beat New Zealand 41–34 to secure a third-place finish in the tournament.

In the latter half of the 2013 season, De Bruin played in four matches for the Free State U21 side during the 2013 Under-21 Provincial Championship before he played in another Varsity Cup campaign for the UFS Shimlas in February and March 2014.

=== Free State Cheetahs / Cheetahs ===
De Bruin's first taste of senior provincial rugby came during the 2014 Vodacom Cup competition for the Free State XV after the 2014 Varsity Cup concluded. He made his debut when he was named in the run-on side for their match against the Eastern Province Kings in Cradock, helping his side to a 31–3 victory. That was the first of five consecutive starts De Bruin made during the competition as they reached the quarter-finals, where they were knocked out by his former side, the Blue Bulls.

De Bruin was included on the reserve bench for the Cheetahs' second-last match of the 2014 Super Rugby season against the Sharks in Bloemfontein.

In July 2014, De Bruin signed a new contract with the Free State Cheetahs until the end of 2016.

=== Leicester Tigers ===
On 11 November 2020 de Bruin's signature was announced by Leicester Tigers for the 2020-21 Premiership Rugby season. He played 17 times in his single season for Leicester.

=== Edinburgh ===
On 9 March 2021, de Bruin would move to Scotland to join Pro14 side Edinburgh ahead of the 2021–22 season.

=== Newcastle Falcons ===
On 15 April 2024, it was confirmed that de Bruin agreed a two-year deal back to the Premiership with Newcastle Falcons from the 2024–25 season.

== Family ==
De Bruin's younger sister, Marlize de Bruin, has played for the South Africa women's national rugby sevens team.
