= Oupa Mohojé =

South African rugby union player

- Full name: Teboho Stephen Mohojé
- Born: 3 August 1990 (age 36) QwaQwa
- Height: 1.93 m (6 ft 4 in)
- Weight: 107 kg (16 st 12 lb; 236 lb)
- School: Louis Botha HTS, Bloemfontein
- University: University of the Free State

Rugby union career
- Position: Lock / Flanker
- Current team: Cheetahs / Free State Cheetahs
Youth career
- 2007–2011: Free State Cheetahs
Amateur team(s)
Years	Team	Apps	(Points)
2011–2014	UFS Shimlas	22	(30)
Senior career
Years	Team	Apps	(Points)
2012–2013	→ Griffons	6	(0)
2013–2016	Free State XV	8	(20)
2013–present	Free State Cheetahs	67	(25)
2014–present	Cheetahs	85	(55)
2022	→ Griffons	7	(5)
- Correct as of 10 July 2022
International career
Years	Team	Apps	(Points)
2014–2018	South Africa	19	(0)
2015	Springboks	1	(0)
2016	Springbok XV	1	(0)
2016	South Africa 'A'	2	(0)
- Correct as of 3 June 2018

Teboho Stephen 'Oupa' Mohojé (born 3 August 1990) is a South African rugby union player for the Cheetahs in the Pro14 and the Free State Cheetahs in the Currie Cup. He can play as a flanker or lock.

== Career ==
Mohojé played for the Free State Cheetahs at the 2007 Under-18 Academy Week as well as the 2008 Under-18 Craven Week. He then progressed to the Under-21 side, playing for them in 2010 and 2011.

Mohojé made his first class debut when he had a loan spell at Griffons in the 2012 Currie Cup First Division game against Border Bulldogs.

Mohojé returned to the Free State Cheetahs and made several appearances for them in the 2013 Vodacom Cup.

During his time at the Free State Cheetahs, he also played for university side the UFS Shimlas in the Varsity Cup competitions in 2011, 2012 and 2013. In 2013, he was voted the "Player That Rocks" for the competition.

=== Representative rugby ===
In May 2014, Mohojé was one of eight uncapped players that were called up to a Springbok training camp prior to the 2014 mid-year rugby union tests.

In 2016, Mohojé was included in a South Africa 'A' squad that played a two-match series against a touring England Saxons team and was appointed the captain of the team. He was named in the starting line-up for their first match in Bloemfontein, but ended on the losing side as the visitors ran out 32–24 winners. He also started the second match of the series, a 26–29 defeat to the Saxons in George.

== Springbok statistics ==
=== Test Match Record ===
Against	Pld	W	D	L	Tri	Con	Pen	DG	Pts	%Won
Australia	1	1	0	0	0	0	0	0	0	100
England	1	1	0	0	0	0	0	0	0	100
Ireland	1	0	0	1	0	0	0	0	0	0
Italy	1	1	0	0	0	0	0	0	0	100
New Zealand	1	1	0	0	0	0	0	0	0	100
Scotland	1	1	0	0	0	0	0	0	0	100
Wales	1	0	0	1	0	0	0	0	0	0
Total	7	5	0	2	0	0	0	0	0	71.43

Pld = Games Played, W = Games Won, D = Games Drawn, L = Games Lost, Tri = Tries Scored, Con = Conversions, Pen = Penalties, DG = Drop Goals, Pts = Points Scored
