= Helmut Lehmann =

Helmut Lehmann may refer to:

- Helmut Lehmann (canoeist) (born 1958), Swiss sprint canoer
- Helmut Lehmann (politician) (1882–1959), German politician
