= Schalk van der Merwe (rugby union) =

South African rugby union player

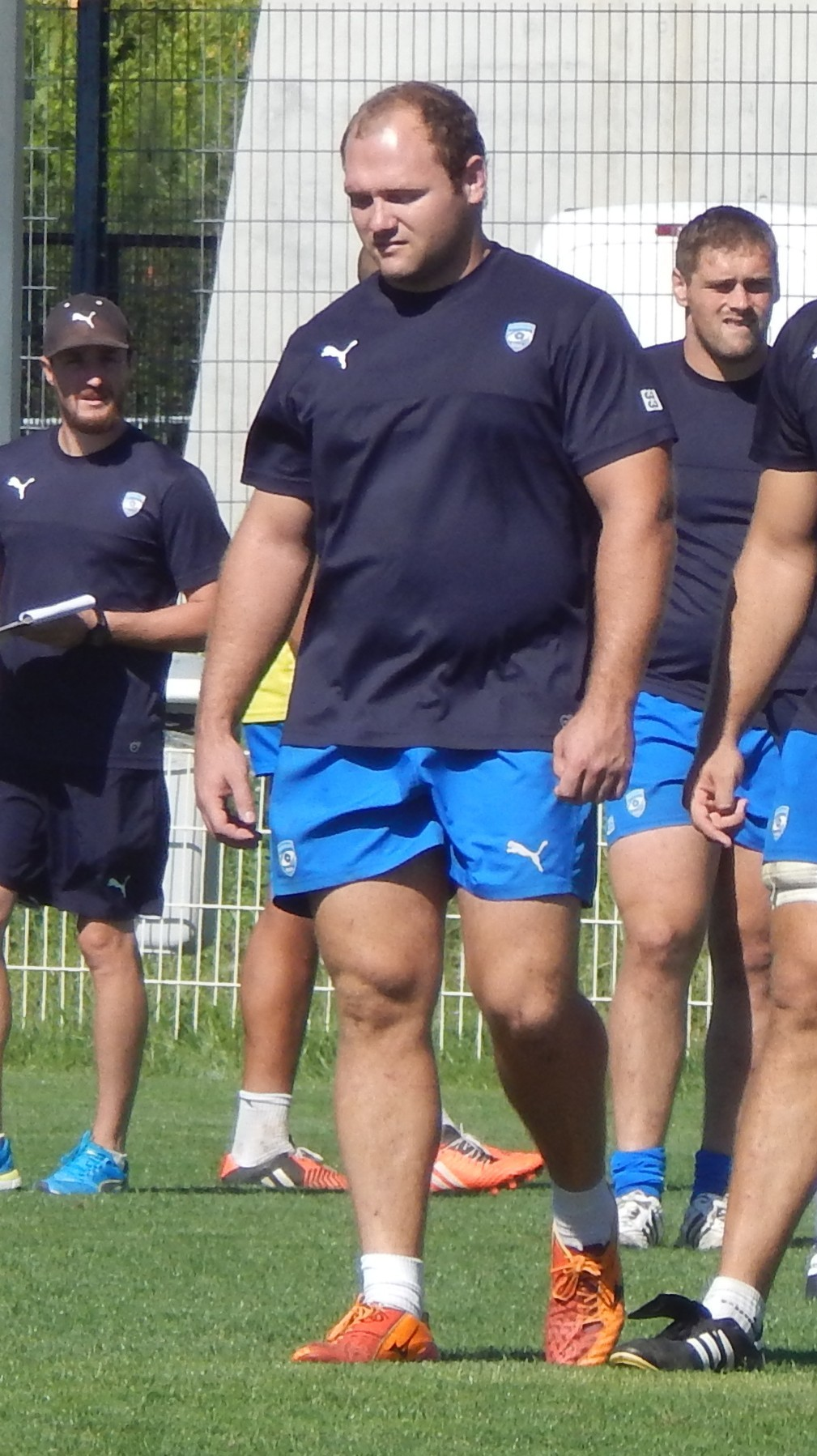
- Van der Merwe in 2015
- Full name: Schalk Willem van der Merwe
- Born: 4 December 1990 (age 35) Tzaneen, South Africa
- Height: 1.84 m (6 ft 1/2 in)
- Weight: 105 kg (231 lb; 16 st 7 lb)
- School: Grey College
- University: University of the Free State

Rugby union career
- Position: Prop
Youth career
- 2006–2007: Griquas
- 2008–2011: Free State Cheetahs
Amateur team(s)
Years	Team	Apps	(Points)
2012–2013	UFS Shimlas	3	(15)
Senior career
Years	Team	Apps	(Points)
2011–2013	Free State Cheetahs	15	(10)
2011	Emerging Cheetahs	1	(0)
2013	→ Griffons	5	(5)
2014–2015	Lions	25	(5)
2014	Golden Lions	11	(10)
2015	Golden Lions XV	1	(10)
2015–2016	Montpellier	6	(0)
2017	Southern Kings	12	(0)
2017–2018	Ulster	4	(0)
2019	→ Griffons	6	(5)
2019	Free State Cheetahs	3	(0)
- Correct as of 8 September 2019
International career
Years	Team	Apps	(Points)
2008	South Africa Schools		
2016	Barbarians	1	(0)
- Correct as of 22 April 2018

Schalk Willem 'Hond' van der Merwe is a former South African rugby union player who last played for the Free State Cheetahs in the Currie Cup. He previously played for the Golden Lions, the Free State Cheetahs and the Griffons in domestic South African rugby, for the Lions and the Southern Kings in Super Rugby, for Montpellier in the French Top 14 and for Irish Pro14 side Ulster. His usual position is prop.

He joined the Golden Lions prior to the 2014 season. He was included in the Lions squad for the 2014 Super Rugby season and made his debut in a 21–20 victory over the Cheetahs in Bloemfontein.

He joined Irish Pro14 side Ulster prior to the 2017–18 season. He was released on 4 December 2018 after making just three Pro14 appearances.
