= Robbie Coetzee =

South African rugby union player

- Full name: Robin Leendert Coetzee
- Born: 2 May 1989 (age 37) Pretoria, South Africa
- Height: 1.85 m (6 ft 1 in)
- Weight: 105 kg (16 st 7 lb; 231 lb)
- School: Hoërskool Eldoraigne

Rugby union career
- Position: Hooker
- Current team: RC Eemland
Youth career
- 2006–2007: Blue Bulls
- 2008–2009: Free State Cheetahs
- 2010: Blue Bulls
Amateur team(s)
Years	Team	Apps	(Points)
2010–2011	UP Tuks	13	(0)
Senior career
Years	Team	Apps	(Points)
2012	Blue Bulls	11	(5)
2013–2019	Golden Lions XV	9	(5)
2013–2018	Golden Lions	44	(25)
2013–2019	Lions	49	(25)
- Correct as of 8 September 2019

Robin Leendert Coetzee (born 2 May 1989) is a South African rugby union player who currently plays for RC Eemland of the Ereklasse in the Netherlands. His usual position is hooker.

He previously played for the Lions in Super Rugby and the Golden Lions XV in the Rugby Challenge.

== Professional rugby career ==
He played for UP Tuks in the 2010 and 2011 Varsity Cup competitions.

He played in both legs of the Lions' promotion/relegation matches after the 2013 Super Rugby season, which saw the Lions regain their spot in Super Rugby.

He was then included in the Lions squad for the 2014 Super Rugby season and made his Super Rugby debut in a 21–20 victory over the Cheetahs in Bloemfontein. He also represented them in Super Rugby in 2015 and 2016.
