= Rohan Janse van Rensburg =

South Africa international rugby union player

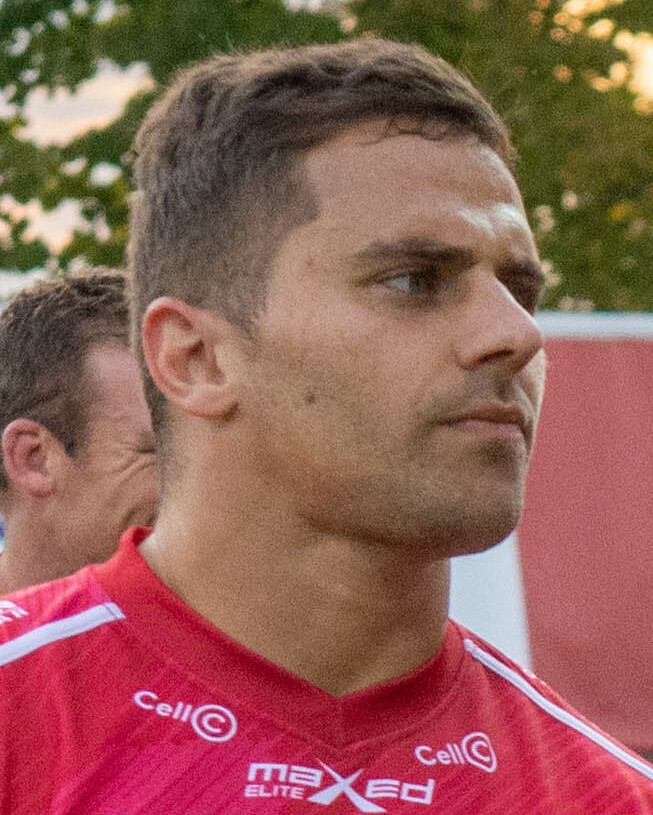
- Janse van Rensburg in 2022
- Full name: Rohan Janse van Rensburg
- Born: 11 September 1994 (age 32) Welkom, South Africa
- Height: 1.85 m (6 ft 1 in)
- Weight: 108 kg (17 st 0 lb; 238 lb)
- School: Hoërskool Waterkloof

Rugby union career
- Position: Centre
- Current team: Bordeaux Bègles
Youth career
- 2007–2014: Blue Bulls
Amateur team(s)
Years	Team	Apps	(Points)
2014	UP Tuks	2	(5)
Senior career
Years	Team	Apps	(Points)
2013–2014	Blue Bulls	7	(20)
2015–2017	Golden Lions XV	7	(10)
2015–2017	Golden Lions	23	(45)
2016–2018	Lions	39	(95)
2017–2018	→ Sale Sharks (loan)	8	(15)
2018–2022	Sale Sharks	73	(115)
2022–2024	Sharks	8	(20)
2023–2024	Sharks (Currie Cup)		
2024	Canon Eagles	11	(20)
2024–	Bordeaux Bègles		
- Correct as of 01 January 2023
International career
Years	Team	Apps	(Points)
2012	South Africa Schools		
2013–2014	South Africa Under-20	3	(0)
2016	Springbok XV	1	(5)
2016	South Africa	1	(0)
- Correct as of 26 May 2018

Rohan Janse van Rensburg (born 11 September 1994) is a South African professional rugby union player for South African United Rugby Championship side the Sharks. His regular position is inside centre.

== Career ==
=== Youth ===
Janse van Rensburg represented the Blue Bulls at the 2007 Under-13 Craven Week, the 2010 Under-16 Grant Khomo Week and the 2011 and 2012 editions of the Under-18 Craven Week tournaments. He was also called into the South African Schools squad in 2012.

=== Senior career ===
His senior debut for the Blue Bulls came in the 2013 Vodacom Cup competition, when he came on as a substitute in the match against the Pumas. He then started five of their remaining six matches in this competition.

Janse van Rensburg moved to Johannesburg for the 2015 to join the Golden Lions.

=== 2016 season ===
The 2016 Super Rugby season was the breakthrough for Janse van Rensburg. At inside centre, he had a very successful partnership with fellow centre, Springbok Lionel Mapoe. Janse van Rensburg managed to score 10 tries in 17 games;which is very prolific for a number 12. The Golden Lions managed to make the 2016 Super Rugby final but lost to the Hurricanes 20-3.

=== Sale Sharks ===
Janse van Rensburg made eight appearances for English Premiership side Sale Sharks in the 2017–18 English Premiership during a loan spell in 2018, before returning on a permanent deal before the 2018–19 season.

He was fined £32,500 and handed a two-week suspension in April 2020 for breaching protocol having been contracted to two teams. Sale Sharks were also found to have breached rules about the way they approached him.

=== Representative rugby ===
Janse van Rensburg was included in the S.A. Schools squad in 2012 and the South Africa Under-20 squad for the 2013 and 2014 IRB Junior World Championship tournaments.

=== Springboks ===
Janse van Rensburg first represented Springboks XV in a non-cap friendly vs Barbarians XV in which he scored a last-gasp try to secure a 31-31 draw. He was later included in the Springboks squad for their 2016 Outgoing series of Europe. He started the final game of the tour vs Wales at inside centre where the Springboks lost.

== Honours ==
Bordeaux Bègles

- 1× European Rugby Champions Cup: 2025
