= Courtnall Skosan =

South African rugby union player

- Full name: Courtnall Douglas Skosan
- Born: 24 July 1991 (age 35) Cape Town, South Africa
- Height: 1.83 m (6 ft 0 in)
- Weight: 93 kg (14 st 9 lb; 205 lb)
- School: Hoërskool Brackenfell
- University: Northlink College
- Occupation: Professional Rugby player

Rugby union career
- Position: Winger
- Current team: Stormers / Western Province
Youth career
- 2010–2012: Blue Bulls
Amateur team(s)
Years	Team	Apps	(Points)
2012–2013	UP Tuks	13	(25)
Senior career
Years	Team	Apps	(Points)
2011–2013	Blue Bulls	12	(35)
2014–2021	Lions	84	(190)
2014–2018	Golden Lions XV	3	(20)
2014–2021	Golden Lions	40	(110)
2021–2023	Northampton Saints	36	(95)
2023–	Stormers	7	(20)
2024–	Western Province	4	(0)
- Correct as of 31 December 2024
International career
Years	Team	Apps	(Points)
2011	South Africa Under-20	3	(5)
2016	South Africa 'A'	2	(0)
2017	South Africa	12	(10)
- Correct as of 17 April 2018

Courtnall Douglas Skosan (born 24 July 1991) is a South African rugby union player for Western Province in the Currie Cup and the Stormers in the United Rugby Championship. His playing position is winger.

== Club career ==
He played for the Blue Bulls at Under-19 and Under-21 level, earning a call-up to the South Africa Under-20 team for the 2011 IRB Junior World Championship. He graduated to the senior team, making his debut for the Blue Bulls in the 2011 Vodacom Cup game against the Sharks XV.

He remained at the Blue Bulls until the end of the 2013 season, making just twelve appearances. He then moved to the Golden Lions for 2014.

He also played for UP Tuks in their victorious 2012 and 2013 Varsity Cup campaigns.

In August 2021, he signed a contract with Premiership club Northampton Saints.

At the end of the 2022/2023 season, Skosan announced he would be departing Saints to play for the South African club DHL Stormers.

=== International career ===
In 2016, Skosan was included in a South Africa 'A' squad that played a two-match series against a touring England Saxons team. He was named in the starting line-up for their first match in Bloemfontein, but ended on the losing side as the visitors ran out 32–24 winners. He also started the second match of the series, a 26–29 defeat to the Saxons in George.

In 2017, Skosan was named to the South Africa team contesting a 3-match series against France. He started the first game and was awarded a penalty try after a French player held him back illegally at the goal line. He scored his first try in a test match on 19 August 2017 in the Rugby Championship test match between South Africa and Argentina.
