= Howard Mnisi =

South African rugby union player

- Full name: Xolane Howard Mnisi
- Born: 13 July 1989 (age 37) Elukwatini, South Africa
- Height: 1.86 m (6 ft 1 in)
- Weight: 96 kg (15 st 2 lb; 212 lb)
- School: Laerskool Badplaas / Standerton High School
- University: Nelson Mandela Metropolitan University

Rugby union career
- Position: Centre
Youth career
- 2006–2007: Pumas
- 2008–2010: Sharks
Amateur team(s)
Years	Team	Apps	(Points)
2012–2013	NMMU Madibaz	15	(10)
Senior career
Years	Team	Apps	(Points)
2011	Sharks XV	3	(5)
2013–2014	Cheetahs	3	(0)
2013–2014	Griquas	20	(15)
2014–2018	Golden Lions	37	(70)
2015–2018	Lions	42	(10)
2018	Golden Lions XV	4	(5)
2019–2020	Southern Kings	7	(5)
2020–2022	Cheetahs	1	(5)
2020–2022	Free State Cheetahs	6	(0)
- Correct as of 13 March 2023
International career
Years	Team	Apps	(Points)
2012–2013	South Africa Students	2	(0)
2016	South Africa 'A'	2	(0)
- Correct as of 17 April 2018

Xolane Howard Mnisi (born 13 July 1989) is a South African rugby union player for the Southern Kings in the Pro14. His regular position is centre.

== Career ==
=== Youth ===
Mnisi represented the Pumas at the 2006 and 2007 Under-18 Craven Week tournaments, which earned him a place in the Sharks academy. He played for their Under-19 team in 2008 and their Under-21 team in 2010.

=== Sharks ===
In 2011, Mnisi was included in the 2011 Vodacom Cup squad and made his debut against the Welwitschias.

=== NMMU Madibaz ===
However, Mnisi failed to break into the Currie Cup team and joined the Varsity Cup side of NMMU Madibaz instead. He was included in the South Africa Students team in 2012 and 2013 and he was also voted as the "Back That Rocks" for the 2013 Varsity Cup tournament.

=== Griquas ===
Mnisi had a trial with the Free State Cheetahs in 2013, but joined the Griquas instead.

=== Golden Lions ===
Mnisi moved to Johannesburg to join the Golden Lions prior to the 2014 Currie Cup Premier Division season.

=== South Africa 'A' ===
In 2016, Mnisi was included in a South Africa 'A' squad that played a two-match series against a touring England Saxons team. He was named in the starting line-up for their first match in Bloemfontein, but ended on the losing side as the visitors ran out 32–24 winners. He was named on the bench for the second match of the series, coming on as a second-half replacement in a 26–29 defeat to the Saxons in George.
