= Sti Sithole =

South African rugby union player

- Full name: Sithembiso Mfundo Siphesihle Sithole
- Born: 31 March 1993 (age 33) Durban, South Africa
- Height: 1.80 m (5 ft 11 in)
- Weight: 115 kg (254 lb; 18 st 2 lb)
- School: Westville Boys' High School, Durban
- University: University of Cape Town
- Occupation: Professional Rugby Player

Rugby union career
- Position: Prop
- Current team: Stormers / Western Province
Youth career
- 2009: Sharks
- 2012–2014: Western Province
Amateur team(s)
Years	Team	Apps	(Points)
2013	UCT Ikey Tigers	6	(5)
Senior career
Years	Team	Apps	(Points)
2014–2016	Western Province	13	(0)
2014–2015	Stormers	3	(0)
2016	Southern Kings	10	(0)
2017–2023	Lions	55	(5)
2017–2018	Golden Lions XV	13	(5)
2017–2023	Golden Lions	43	(15)
- Correct as of 13 June 2023
International career
Years	Team	Apps	(Points)
2013	South Africa Under-20	4	(0)
- Correct as of 16 April 2018

Sithembiso Mfundo Siphesihle 'Sti' Sithole (born 31 March 1993 in Durban, South Africa) is a South African rugby union player for the Stormers in United Rugby Championship, Western Province in the Currie Cup . His regular position is loosehead prop.

== Career ==
=== Youth and Varsity rugby ===
As a scholar at Westville Boys' High School, Sithole was included in the KwaZulu-Natal squad at the Under-16 Grant Khomo Week in 2009.

He then moved to Cape Town to join Western Province. He played for the Western Province U19 side during the 2012 Under-19 Provincial Championship (making thirteen appearances as he helped the team win the competition) and for the Western Province U21 side during the 2013 Under-21 Provincial Championship (once again helping him team win the tournament).

He also played for the UCT Ikey Tigers during the 2013 Varsity Cup competition.

=== 2013 IRB Junior World Championship ===
In 2013, Sithole was a member of the South African Under-20 side that competed at the 2013 IRB Junior World Championship in France. After substitute appearances in their pool stage matches against the United States and England, he started in their final pool stage match against hosts France. He was an unused substitute as South Africa got eliminated from the competition in the Semi-finals against Wales, but was restored to their third place play-off match against New Zealand, helping South Africa to a third-place finish in the tournament.

=== Western Province / Stormers ===
His first senior start in domestic rugby came during the 2014 Vodacom Cup competition in April 2014. He came on as a substitute against Kenyan invitational side Simba XV, with the South African side winning 65–29. His first start came three weeks later, as Western Province suffered a surprise defeat against the SWD Eagles in George and he also saw some game time in their quarter-final match, where they got eliminated from the competition by the Pumas in Nelspruit.

In May 2014, Sithole was drafted into the Stormers squad for their 2014 Super Rugby match against the Sharks in Durban.
