= Clayton Blommetjies =

South African rugby union player

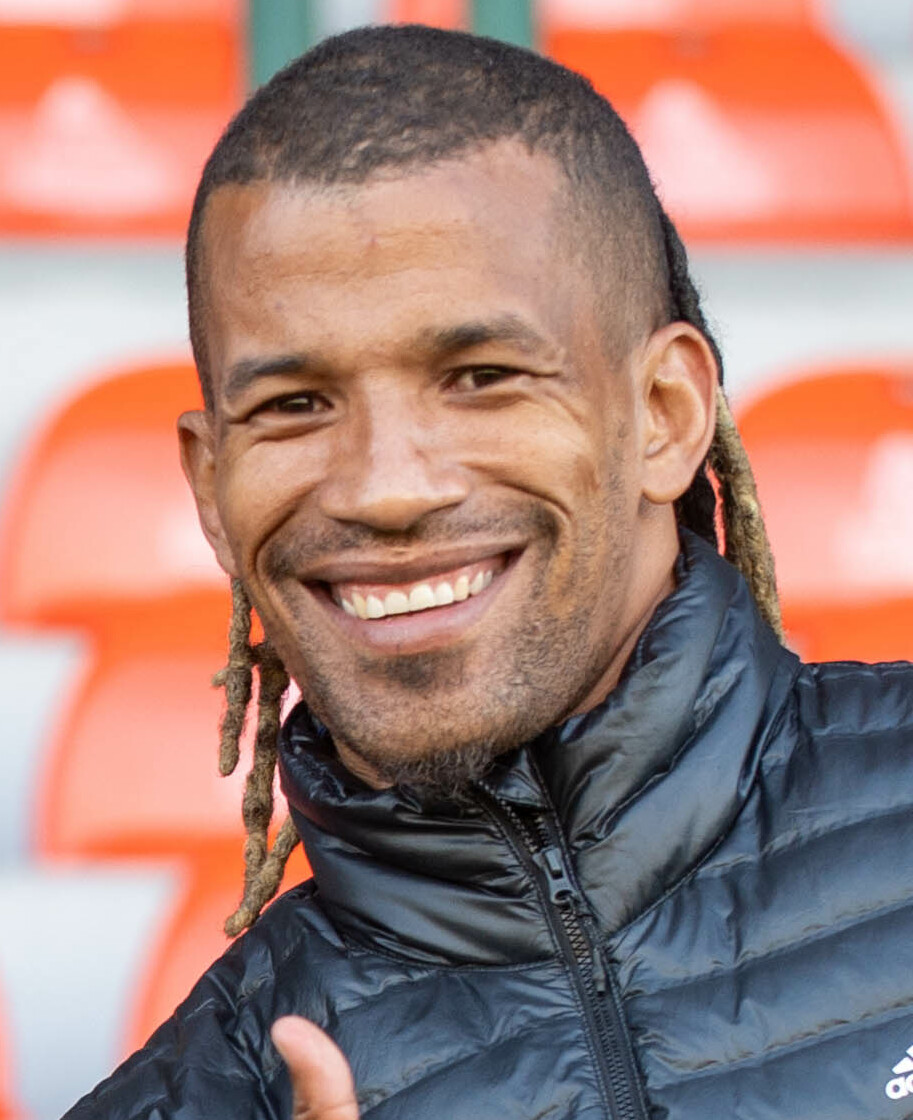
- Clayton Blommetjies in 2023
- Full name: Clayton Anthony Blommetjies
- Born: 30 August 1990 (age 36) Paarl, South Africa
- Height: 1.85 m (6 ft 1 in)
- Weight: 87 kg (13 st 10 lb; 192 lb)
- School: New Orleans S.S.S.
- Occupation: Professional rugby player

Rugby union career
- Position: Fullback / Wing
- Current team: Stormers / Western Province
Youth career
- 2006–2008: Boland Cavaliers
- 2009–2011: Blue Bulls
Amateur team(s)
Years	Team	Apps	(Points)
2009–2014	UP Tuks	16	(46)
Senior career
Years	Team	Apps	(Points)
2010–2014	Blue Bulls	41	(60)
2014–2017	Free State Cheetahs	36	(46)
2015–2018	Cheetahs	54	(60)
2015	Free State XV	1	(0)
2018–2019	Scarlets	6	(5)
2019	→ Leicester Tigers	2	(5)
2019–2022	Free State Cheetahs	27	(35)
2019–2022	Cheetahs	15	(20)
2022–	Stormers	1	
2023–	Western Province		
- Correct as of 16 September 2022
International career
Years	Team	Apps	(Points)
2009	South Africa Students	1	(10)
2009	South Africa Under-20	2	(0)
2012	South Africa Sevens		
2016	Barbarians	1	(0)
- Correct as of 22 April 2018

Clayton Anthony Blommetjies (born 30 August 1990) is a South African rugby union player for the Stormers in the United Rugby Championship and Western Province in the Currie Cup. His usual position is either full-back or wing.

== Career ==
After representing Boland Cavaliers at youth level, he joined the Blue Bulls in 2009.

Blommetjies has made a total of 26 appearances in the Vodacom Cup and made his Currie Cup debut in the opening match of the 2012 Currie Cup Premier Division against Griquas.

Blommetjies has also represented UP Tuks in the Varsity Cup since 2009.

Blommetjies signed a deal with Bloemfontein-based side the Free State Cheetahs to join them starting 1 August 2014.

In 2018 Blommetjies had participated in the Guinness PRO14 against Ulster but since then had disappeared from public view.

On 9 April 2019 Blommetjies joined Leicester Tigers in England's Premiership Rugby competition on loan. After appearing twice for the club he returned to Scarlets.
