= Corné Fourie =

South African rugby union player

- Born: 2 September 1988 (age 38) Roodepoort, South Africa
- Height: 1.87 m (6 ft 1 1/2 in)
- Weight: 118 kg (18 st 8 lb; 260 lb)
- School: Hoërskool Waterkloof
- University: University of South Africa

Rugby union career
- Position: Prop / Hooker
- Current team: Pumas
Amateur team(s)
Years	Team	Apps	(Points)
2008–2011	UP Tuks	14	(0)
Senior career
Years	Team	Apps	(Points)
2010–2011	Blue Bulls	16	(15)
2012–2015	Pumas	72	(30)
2014–2018	Lions	64	(30)
2016–2018	Golden Lions XV	7	(10)
2016–2018	Golden Lions	15	(15)
2018–2019	Panasonic Wild Knights	3	(0)
2019	Stormers	16	(0)
2019	Western Province	6	(0)
2019–2021	Gloucester	13	(0)
2021–	Pumas	29	(45)
2023–2024	Lions	10	(0)
- Correct as of 18 June 2024
International career
Years	Team	Apps	(Points)
2008	South Africa Under-20	4	(0)
2012	South African Barbarians	1	(0)
- Correct as of 16 April 2018

Corné Fourie (born 2 September 1988) is a South African rugby union player. He can play as a loosehead prop or hooker. He previously played for the Blue Bulls, the Pumas, the Golden Lions and Western Province domestically, for the Lions and Stormers in Super Rugby, the Panasonic Wild Knights in the Top League in Japan and Gloucester in the English Premiership Rugby.

He joined the Golden Lions Currie Cup team for the 2016 season.

On 9 September 2019, it was confirmed that Fourie would join Premiership Rugby side Gloucester for the 2019–20 season. He left on 9 April 2021.
