= Marvin Orie =

South African rugby union player

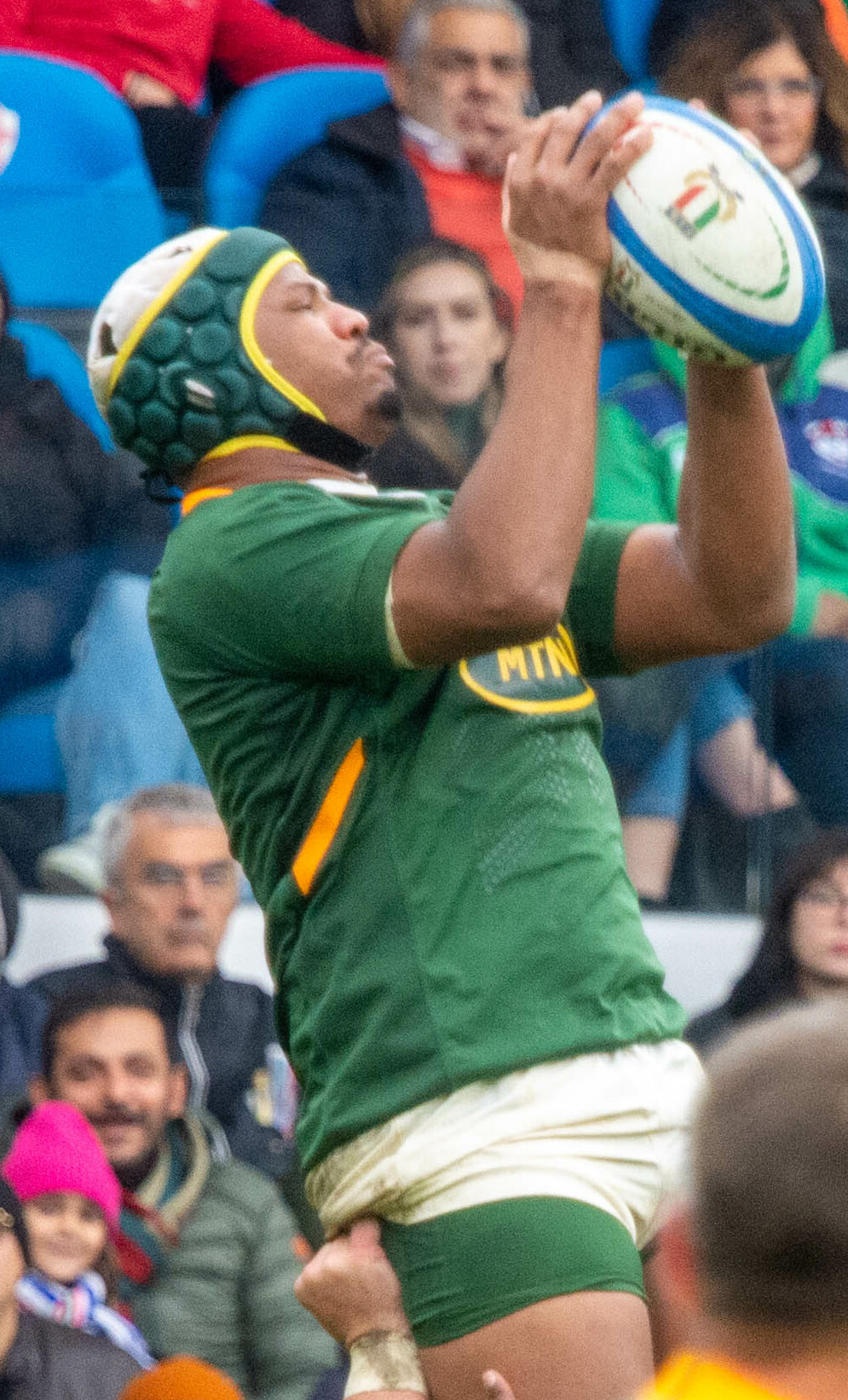
- Born: 15 February 1993 (age 33) Cape Town, South Africa
- Height: 2.01 m (6 ft 7 in)
- Weight: 115 kg (18 st 2 lb; 254 lb)
- School: Tygerberg High School

Rugby union career
- Position: Lock
- Current team: Sharks / Blue Bulls
Youth career
- 2006–2010: Western Province
- 2011–2014: Blue Bulls
Amateur team(s)
Years	Team	Apps	(Points)
2013	UP Tuks	9	(0)
Senior career
Years	Team	Apps	(Points)
2012–2016	Blue Bulls	35	(15)
2016	Blue Bulls	5	(0)
2014–2016	Bulls	10	(0)
2017–2020	Lions	43	(15)
2017	Golden Lions XV	8	(10)
2017–2021	Golden Lions	31	(10)
2019	→ Ospreys	7	(0)
2021–2023	Stormers	21	(0)
2021–2023	Western Province	42	(5)
2023-2025	USA Perpignan	10	(0)
2025–	Sharks		
- Correct as of 25 February 2024
International career
Years	Team	Apps	(Points)
2012	South Africa Under-20	0	(0)
2018–present	South Africa	16	(0)
- Correct as of 25 February 2024

Marvin Orie (born 15 February 1993 in Cape Town) is a South African rugby union player for the South Africa national team, the Sharks in the United Rugby Championship. His regular position is lock.

== Career ==
=== Youth and Varsity rugby ===
After having represented Western Province at the 2006 Under-13 Craven Week, the 2009 Under-16 Grant Khomo Week and the 2010 Under-18 Craven Week tournaments, Orie made the move north to join Pretoria-based side the Blue Bulls.

He played for the Blue Bulls U19 side that were the losing finalists in the 2011 Under-19 Provincial Championship competition and for the Blue Bulls U21 side that won the Under-21 Provincial Championship the following season. He was also a member of the South African Under-20 side that memorably won the 2012 IRB Junior World Championship on home soil, although he didn't make an appearance in the tournament.

In 2013, Orie played for Pretoria university side UP Tuks in the Varsity Cup competition, helping them win the competition for the second consecutive season. He was set to captain the Junior Boks at the 2013 IRB Junior World Championship, but suffered a horrific broken leg in the Varsity Cup final and missed the remainder of the 2013 season.

=== Blue Bulls ===
Orie was named as a substitute for the Blue Bulls' 2012 Vodacom Cup match against the Pumas in Nelspruit, but failed to make an appearance. However, due to his involvement with UP Tuks in the 2013 Varsity Cup and the subsequent broken leg he suffered, he only made his first class debut two years later, making an appearance from the bench in their 30–26 victory over the Leopards in Leeudoringstad in the 2014 Vodacom Cup competition. After five substitute appearances, he made his first start in the Semi-Finals of the competition against the Golden Lions.

=== Lions ===
He moved to trans-Jukskei rivals the Lions for the 2017 season.
