= 2014 Super Rugby season =

Men's rugby union club competition

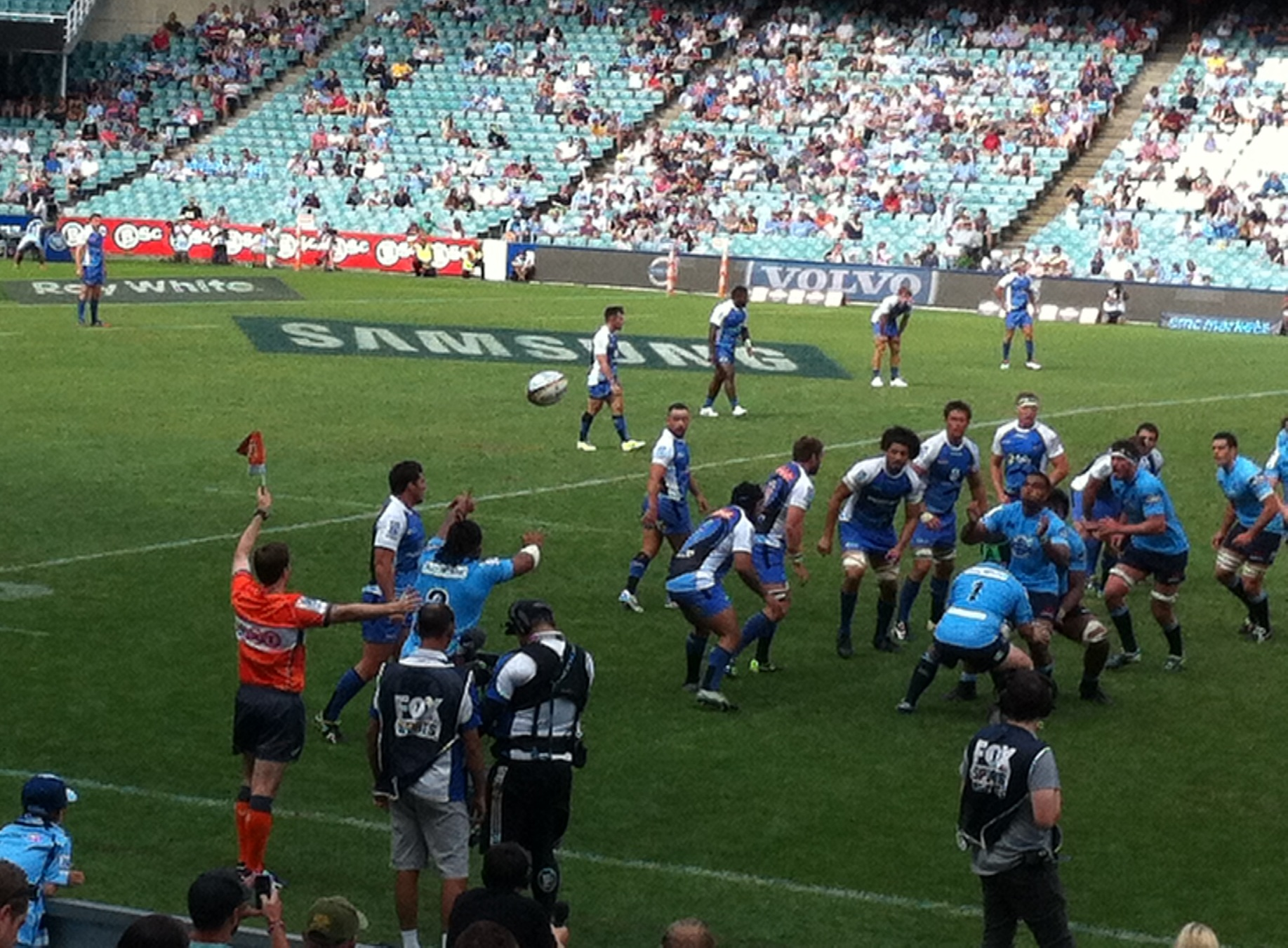
- Waratahs vs. Force
- Countries: Australia (5 teams); New Zealand (5 teams); South Africa (5 teams)
- Tournament format(s): Round-robin and knockout
- Champions: Waratahs (1st title)
- Matches played: 125
- Tries scored: 614 (4.91 per match)
- Top point scorer(s): Bernard Foley (252)
- Top try scorer(s): Israel Folau / Nemani Nadolo (12)
- Official website: Official site

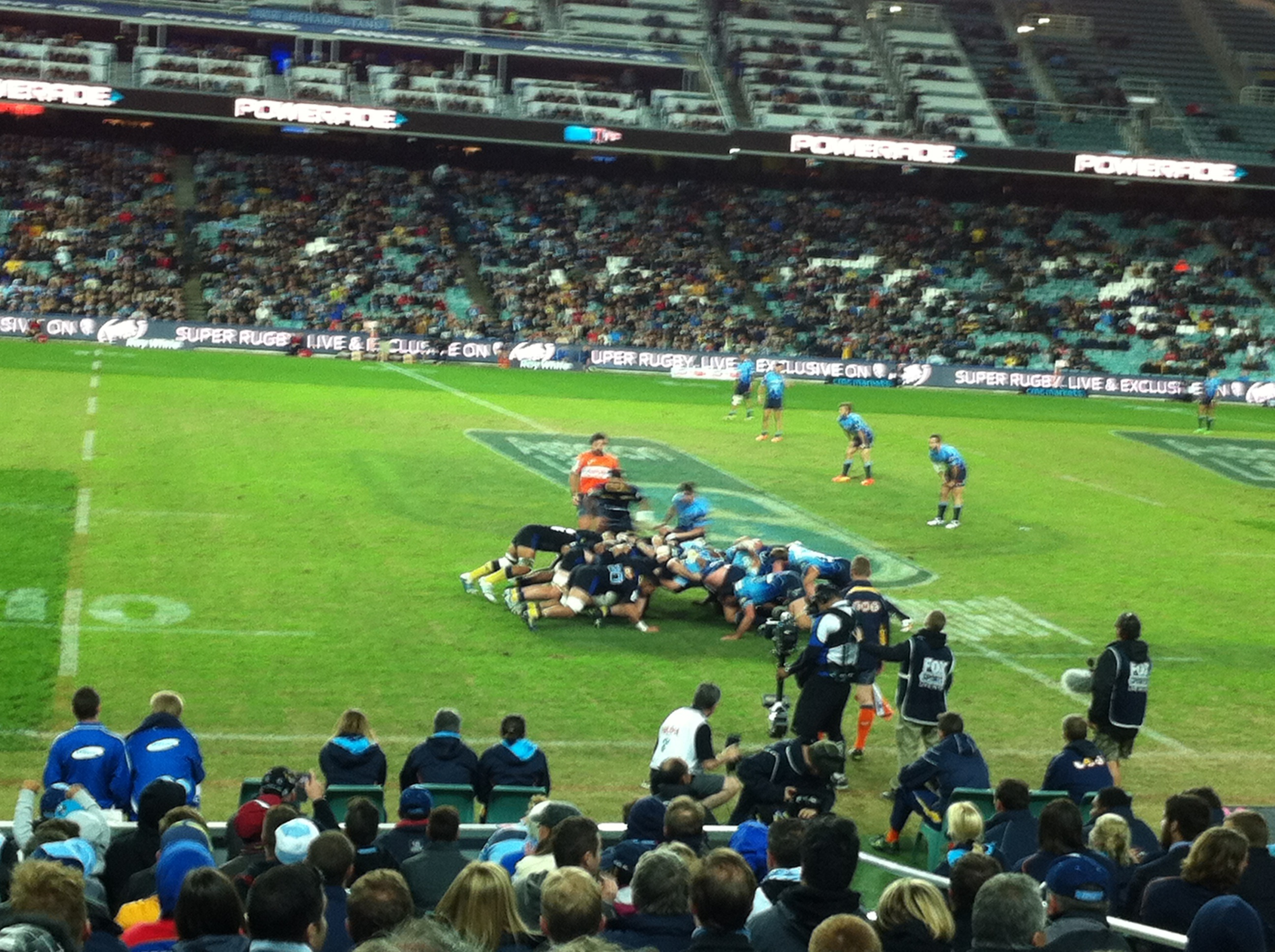
Waratahs vs Hurricanes Super Rugby 2014

The 2014 Super Rugby season was the fourth season of the 15-team format for the Super Rugby competition involving teams from Australia, New Zealand and South Africa. For sponsorship reasons, this competition was known as Asteron Life Super Rugby in Australia, Investec Super Rugby in New Zealand and Vodacom Super Rugby in South Africa. Including its past incarnations as Super 12 and Super 14, this was the 19th season for the Southern Hemisphere's premier transnational club competition. The conference games took place every weekend from 15 February until 12 July (with a three-week break between rounds 16 and 17 for internationals games), followed by the finals series, culminating in the grand final on 2 August. The winners of the 2014 Super Rugby Season were the New South Wales Waratahs.

== Competition format ==
Covering 24 weeks, the schedule features a total of 125 matches. The 15 teams are grouped by geography, labelled the Australian Conference, New Zealand Conference and the South African Conference. The regular season consists of two types of matches:

- Internal Conference Matches – Each team plays the other four teams in the same conference twice, home and away.
- Cross Conference Matches – Each team plays four teams of the other two conferences away, and four teams of the other two conferences home, thus missing out on two teams (one from each of the other conferences). Each team plays two home and two away games against teams from each of the other countries, making a total of eight cross conference games for each team. There will be a three-week international break between rounds 15 and 16 of the regular season.

The top team of each conference, plus the next top three teams in table points regardless of conference (wild card teams), will move on to the finals. The top two conference winners, based on table points, receive first-round byes. In the first round of the finals, the third conference winner is the #3 seed and hosts the wild card team with the worst record, and the best wild card team hosts the second-best wild card team. In the semi-finals, the #2 conference winner hosts the higher surviving seed from the first round, and the #1 conference winner hosts the other first-round winner. The final is hosted by the top remaining seed. The two-legged promotion/relegation play-off initially scheduled between the bottom team in the South African Conference and the Southern Kings was abolished following a meeting on 13 February 2014.

== Standings ==
Conference leaders and wildcard teams qualified to the finals. The top six teams qualified to the finals, with their final positions in the overall log determining their seedings in the finals. The third-placed team (i.e. the conference winners with the worst overall record) will host the sixth-placed team in the qualifiers, while the fourth-placed team will host the fifth-placed team. The top two teams (i.e. the two conference winners with the best overall record) will qualify directly to the semi-finals, where they will have home advantage against the two qualifier winners, with the top team hosting the qualifier winner with the lower seeding and the second-placed team hosting the qualifier winner with the higher seeding. The two semi-final winners will progress to the final, with the team with the higher seeding having home advantage.

Points breakdown: 4 points for a win, 2 points for a draw, 1 bonus point for a loss by seven points or less, 1 bonus point for scoring four or more tries in a match.

Classification: Teams standings are calculated as follows: Conference Leaders (i.e. conference leaders will always be ranked in the top three), Log points, Number of games won, Overall points difference, Number of tries scored, Overall try difference

Key:

- Qualified to the Semi-finals with home advantage
- Qualified to the Qualifying final with home advantage
- Qualified to the Qualifying final

Season standings
Pos	Team	Pld	W	D	L	PF	PA	PD	TF	TA	TB	LB	Pts
1	Waratahs (C)	16	12	0	4	481	272	+209	55	24	9	1	58
2	Crusaders	16	11	0	5	445	322	+123	41	36	4	3	51
3	Sharks	16	11	0	5	406	293	+113	29	22	2	4	50
4	Brumbies	16	10	0	6	412	378	+34	49	35	4	1	45
5	Chiefs	16	8	2	6	384	378	+6	44	35	5	3	44
6	Highlanders	16	8	0	8	401	442	−41	39	52	5	5	42
7	Hurricanes	16	8	0	8	439	374	+65	49	36	6	3	41
8	Western Force	16	9	0	7	343	393	−50	37	40	3	1	40
9	Bulls	16	7	1	8	365	335	+30	28	29	3	5	38
10	Blues	16	7	0	9	419	395	+24	46	43	6	3	37
11	Stormers	16	7	0	9	290	326	−36	30	29	2	2	32
12	Lions	16	7	0	9	367	413	−46	31	46	2	1	31
13	Reds	16	5	0	11	374	493	−119	42	52	4	4	28
14	Cheetahs	16	4	1	11	372	527	−155	38	59	3	3	24
15	Rebels	16	4	0	12	303	460	−157	29	49	1	4	21

(C) Champion

=== Round-by-round ===
Team progression – 2014 Super Rugby season
Team	R1	R2	R3	R4	R5	R6	R7	R8	R9	R10	R11	R12	R13	R14	R15	R16	R17	R18	R19
Waratahs	—N/a	5 (2nd)	10 (1st)	10 (2nd)	11 (5th)	16 (5th)	16 (5th)	20 (4th)	20 (5th)	24 (4th)	24 (6th)	29 (4th)	29 (8th)	34 (4th)	39 (2nd)	43 (2nd)	48 (1st)	53 (1st)	58 (1st)
Crusaders	—N/a	0 (11th)	0 (14th)	4 (14th)	8 (9th)	8 (11th)	9 (13th)	13 (12th)	18 (7th)	22 (6th)	22 (8th)	26 (6th)	31 (4th)	32 (6th)	37 (3rd)	41 (3rd)	42 (3rd)	46 (2nd)	51 (2nd)
Sharks	5 (1st)	9 (1st)	9 (2nd)	14 (1st)	18 (1st)	19 (1st)	23 (1st)	23 (1st)	27 (1st)	31 (1st)	31 (1st)	35 (1st)	36 (1st)	40 (1st)	44 (1st)	45 (1st)	45 (2nd)	46 (3rd)	50 (3rd)
Brumbies	—N/a	0 (12th)	4 (10th)	9 (5th)	13 (3rd)	17 (2nd)	17 (2nd)	21 (2nd)	25 (2nd)	25 (2nd)	30 (2nd)	30 (2nd)	34 (3rd)	35 (2nd)	35 (7th)	40 (4th)	40 (6th)	40 (6th)	45 (4th)
Chiefs	—N/a	4 (7th)	8 (3rd)	8 (3rd)	13 (2nd)	14 (3rd)	17 (3rd)	20 (3rd)	24 (3rd)	25 (3rd)	25 (5th)	30 (3rd)	35 (2nd)	35 (3rd)	35 (8th)	35 (8th)	36 (9th)	40 (8th)	44 (5th)
Highlanders	—N/a	5 (3rd)	6 (5th)	6 (8th)	7 (10th)	11 (9th)	11 (11th)	15 (10th)	19 (6th)	19 (8th)	24 (7th)	26 (8th)	30 (7th)	34 (5th)	36 (6th)	38 (5th)	42 (4th)	42 (4th)	42 (6th)
Hurricanes	—N/a	0 (13th)	1 (13th)	1 (15th)	6 (12th)	7 (12th)	12 (10th)	16 (8th)	16 (10th)	21 (7th)	26 (3rd)	26 (7th)	30 (6th)	31 (8th)	36 (5th)	37 (6th)	41 (5th)	41 (5th)	41 (7th)
Western Force	—N/a	0 (14th)	0 (15th)	5 (10th)	10 (7th)	14 (7th)	14 (8th)	18 (5th)	22 (4th)	23 (5th)	27 (4th)	27 (5th)	31 (5th)	31 (7th)	36 (4th)	36 (7th)	36 (7th)	40 (7th)	40 (8th)
Bulls	0 (15th)	1 (8th)	5 (8th)	10 (4th)	10 (6th)	14 (6th)	16 (7th)	17 (6th)	18 (8th)	19 (9th)	20 (10th)	24 (10th)	28 (9th)	28 (9th)	33 (9th)	33 (9th)	33 (10th)	33 (10th)	38 (9th)
Blues	—N/a	0 (10th)	5 (7th)	5 (11th)	7 (11th)	12 (8th)	16 (6th)	16 (9th)	16 (11th)	16 (11th)	20 (9th)	25 (9th)	25 (10th)	25 (10th)	26 (10th)	31 (10th)	36 (8th)	36 (9th)	37 (10th)
Stormers	—N/a	0 (15th)	4 (12th)	5 (12th)	5 (14th)	5 (14th)	6 (14th)	6 (15th)	6 (15th)	10 (14th)	10 (15th)	15 (14th)	15 (15th)	19 (13th)	24 (11th)	28 (11th)	28 (11th)	32 (11th)	32 (11th)
Lions	4 (4th)	8 (4th)	8 (4th)	8 (7th)	12 (4th)	16 (4th)	16 (4th)	16 (7th)	16 (9th)	16 (10th)	16 (11th)	16 (12th)	18 (11th)	18 (14th)	18 (14th)	22 (13th)	22 (13th)	26 (13th)	31 (12th)
Reds	—N/a	4 (6th)	4 (11th)	9 (6th)	9 (8th)	10 (10th)	14 (9th)	15 (11th)	16 (12th)	16 (12th)	16 (13th)	16 (13th)	17 (13th)	18 (15th)	18 (15th)	23 (12th)	28 (12th)	28 (12th)	28 (13th)
Cheetahs	1 (5th)	5 (5th)	5 (9th)	5 (13th)	5 (15th)	5 (15th)	5 (15th)	8 (14th)	9 (14th)	9 (15th)	14 (14th)	15 (15th)	16 (14th)	20 (12th)	20 (13th)	20 (15th)	20 (15th)	24 (14th)	24 (14th)
Rebels	—N/a	0 (9th)	5 (6th)	5 (9th)	6 (13th)	6 (13th)	10 (12th)	11 (13th)	12 (13th)	16 (13th)	16 (12th)	17 (11th)	17 (12th)	21 (11th)	21 (12th)	21 (14th)	21 (14th)	21 (15th)	21 (15th)
The table above shows a team's progression throughout the season. For each round, each team's cumulative points total is shown with the overall log position in brackets. Note: Due to the schedule of the 2014 mid-year rugby union tests, only South African teams played in Round 1 and only Australian and New Zealand teams in Round 17. Also, unlike previous seasons, teams did not get points for byes during the season. Therefore, some teams were in an artificially higher position due to the fixture schedule.
Key:	win	draw	loss	bye															

== Fixtures ==
The following fixtures were released 7 October 2013.

=== Round 1 ===
15 February 2014	Cheetahs	20–21	Lions	Free State Stadium, Bloemfontein
17:05	Try: Raymond Rhule 24'; Cornal Hendricks 50'; Con: Johan Goosen 25', 51' (2/2); Pen: Johan Goosen 20' (1/3); Elgar Watts 70' (1/2); Cards: Jean Cook (yellow card) 61' to 72'	Report; Scoreboard	Pen: Marnitz Boshoff 16', 30', 40', 58', 62', 75' (6/6); Drop: Marnitz Boshoff 79' (1/3)	Attendance: 17,682; Referee: Craig Joubert

15 February 2014	Sharks	31–16	Bulls	Growthpoint Kings Park, Durban
19:10	Try: Paul Jordaan 10'; Cobus Reinach 21'; Odwa Ndungane 40'; Patrick Lambie 83'; Con: Patrick Lambie 40' (1/4); Pen: Patrick Lambie 4', 32', 47' (3/3); François Steyn (0/2); Cards: Jean Deysel (yellow card) 66' to 77'	Report; Scoreboard	Try: Jono Ross 72'; Con: Handré Pollard 73' (1/1); Pen: Louis Fouché 15', 37' (2/5); Drop: Louis Fouché 9' (1/2); Jan Serfontein (0/1); Cards: Bjorn Basson (yellow card) 79'	Attendance: 34,062; Referee: Jaco Peyper

Bye/s: Blues, Brumbies, Chiefs, Crusaders, Western Force, Highlanders, Hurricanes, Rebels, Reds, Stormers, Waratahs

=== Round 2 ===
21 February 2014	Crusaders	10–18	Chiefs	AMI Stadium, Christchurch
19:35	Try: Sam Whitelock 49'; Con: Tom Taylor 50' (1/1); Pen: Tyler Bleyendaal (0/5); Tom Taylor 74' (1/3); Cards: Dominic Bird (yellow card) 37' to 42'; George Whitelock (yellow card) 44' to 56'	Report; Scoreboard	Try: Robbie Fruean 10'; James Lowe 79'; Con: Aaron Cruden 80' (1/2); Pen: Aaron Cruden 39', 45' (2/2); Cards: Ben Tameifuna (yellow card) 40' to 50'	Attendance: 17,300; Referee: Chris Pollock

21 February 2014	Cheetahs	15–9	Bulls	Free State Stadium, Bloemfontein
19:10	Pen: Johan Goosen 6', 25', 29', 61' (4/5); Drop: Johan Goosen 2' (1/4); Willie le Roux (0/1)	Report; Scoreboard	Pen: Louis Fouché 23' (1/3); Handré Pollard 79', 52' (2/3)	Attendance: 17,616; Referee: Stuart Berry

22 February 2014	Highlanders	29–21	Blues	Forsyth Barr Stadium, Dunedin
19:35	Try: Aaron Smith 10'; Malakai Fekitoa 13'; Ben Smith 40'; Patrick Osborne 50'; Con: Lima Sopoaga 11', 14', 40' (3/4); Pen: Lima Sopoaga 18' (1/3)	Report; Scoreboard	Try: Francis Saili 41'; Angus Ta'avao 64'; Patrick Tuipulotu 69'; Con: Chris Noakes 42', 65', 70' (3/3); Pen: Chris Noakes (0/3)	Attendance: 15,500; Referee: Garratt Williamson

22 February 2014	Brumbies	17–27	Reds	GIO Stadium, Canberra
19:40	Try: Jesse Mogg 54'; Con: Jesse Mogg (0/1); Pen: Jesse Mogg 9', 31', 48' (3/5); Nic White 15' (1/1)	Report; Scoreboard	Try: Lachlan Turner 17'; Aidan Toua 22'; Chris Feauai-Sautia 78'; Con: Quade Cooper 18', 23', 79' (3/3); Pen: Quade Cooper 33', 50' (2/5); Cards: Greg Holmes (yellow card) 53' to 63'	Attendance: 13,670; Referee: James Leckie

22 February 2014	Sharks	27–9	Hurricanes	Growthpoint Kings Park, Durban
17:05	Try: Willem Alberts 20'; Lwazi Mvovo 65'; Con: Patrick Lambie 21' (1/2); Pen: Patrick Lambie 6', 43', 58', 78', 81' (5/5)	Report; Scoreboard	Pen: Beauden Barrett 34', 52' (2/2); Marty Banks 37' (1/1); Cards: Adam Hill (yellow card) 72'	Attendance: 23,722; Referee: Andrew Lees

22 February 2014	Lions	34–10	Stormers	Ellis Park Stadium, Johannesburg
19:10	Try: Stefan Watermeyer 2'; Con: Marnitz Boshoff 3' (1/1); Pen: Marnitz Boshoff 15', 20', 35', 51', 72', 80' (6/6); Drop: Marnitz Boshoff 5', 9', 66' (3/4); Cards: Franco Mostert (yellow card) 43' to 55'; Julian Redelinghuys (yellow card) 55' to 68'	Report; Scoreboard	Try: Scarra Ntubeni 23'; Con: Demetri Catrakilis 24' (1/1); Pen: Demetri Catrakilis 40' (1/2)	Attendance: 38,265; Referee: Jaco Peyper

23 February 2014	Waratahs	43–21	Western Force	Allianz Stadium, Sydney
16:05	Try: Israel Folau 1', 23', 66'; Alofa Alofa 40'; Kane Douglas 57'; Kurtley Beale 71'; Con: Bernard Foley 24', 40', 58', 67', 72' (5/6); Pen: Bernard Foley 16' (1/2); Cards: Paddy Ryan (yellow card) 44' to 55'	Report; Scoreboard	Try: Nick Cummins 35'; Kyle Godwin 63'; Con: Zack Holmes 64' (1/2); Pen: Zack Holmes 10', 26', 52' (3/4)	Attendance: 16,091; Referee: Rohan Hoffmann

Bye/s: Rebels

=== Round 3 ===
28 February 2014	Blues	35–24	Crusaders	Eden Park, Auckland
19:35	Try: Frank Halai 34'; Tevita Li 36'; George Moala 42'; Jackson Willison 47'; Con: Simon Hickey 35', 43', 48' (3/4); Pen: Simon Hickey 19', 55', 80' (3/3); Cards: Steven Luatua (yellow card) 67' to 77'	Report; Scoreboard	Try: Corey Flynn 15'; Colin Slade 31'; Ryan Crotty 72'; Con: Tom Taylor 16', 32', 73' (3/3); Pen: Tom Taylor 21' (1/3)	Attendance: 26,211; Referee: Mike Fraser

28 February 2014	Rebels	35–14	Cheetahs	AAMI Park, Melbourne
19:40	Try: Lachlan Mitchell 5'; Jason Woodward 21'; Luke Burgess 39'; Bryce Hegarty 59'; Scott Higginbotham 82'; Con: Jason Woodward (0/2); Bryce Hegarty 40', 60' (2/2) Angus Roberts (0/1); Pen: Jason Woodward (0/1) Bryce Hegarty (0/1); Angus Roberts 80' (1/2); Drop: Angus Roberts 76' (1/1); Cards: Scott Fuglistaller (yellow card) 51' to 61'	Report; Scoreboard	Try: Jean Cook 45'; Ryno Barnes 71'; Con: Johan Goosen 46', 71' (2/2); Pen: Johan Goosen (0/2)	Attendance: 10,792; Referee: Angus Gardner

28 February 2014	Stormers	19–18	Hurricanes	DHL Newlands, Cape Town
19:10	Try: Deon Fourie 77'; Con: Demetri Catrakilis 78' (1/1); Pen: Demetri Catrakilis 8', 21', 49', 64' (4/4)	Report; Scoreboard	Try: Julian Savea 34'; Cory Jane 38'; Con: Beauden Barrett 35' (1/2); Pen: Beauden Barrett 60', 68' (2/2)	Attendance: 31,814; Referee: Steve Walsh

1 March 2014	Chiefs	21–19	Highlanders	Waikato Stadium, Hamilton
19:35	Try: Tim Nanai-Williams 10'; Liam Messam 48'; Charlie Ngatai 68'; Con: Aaron Cruden 11', 49', 69' (3/3); Pen: Aaron Cruden (0/2)	Report; Scoreboard	Try: John Hardie 32'; Con: Lima Sopoaga 33' (1/1); Pen: Lima Sopoaga 3', 20', 38', 58' (4/4)	Attendance: 14,120; Referee: Rohan Hoffmann

1 March 2014	Waratahs	32–5	Reds	ANZ Stadium, Sydney
19:40	Try: Israel Folau 3', 25'; Peter Betham 34'; Kurtley Beale 47'; Con: Bernard Foley 26', 35', 48' (3/4); Pen: Bernard Foley 61', 79' (2/2); Cards: Israel Folau (yellow card) 40' to 49'	Report; Scoreboard	Try: Lachlan Turner 40'; Con: Quade Cooper (0/1)	Attendance: 17,580; Referee: Glen Jackson

1 March 2014	Western Force	14–27	Brumbies	nib Stadium, Perth
19:00	Try: Jayden Hayward 77'; Ben McCalman 82'; Con: Sias Ebersohn 78', 83' (2/2)	Report; Scoreboard	Try: Scott Fardy 9'; Jesse Mogg 15'; Robbie Coleman 23'; Con: Nic White 10', 16', 24' (3/3); Pen: Nic White 40', 55' (2/3); Cards: Jesse Mogg (yellow card) 29' to 39'	Attendance: 10,589; Referee: Nick Briant

1 March 2014	Bulls	25–17	Lions	Loftus Versfeld, Pretoria
17:05	Try: Jan Serfontein 24'; Con: Jacques-Louis Potgieter 25' (1/1); Pen: Jacques-Louis Potgieter 9', 12', 39', 62', 75' (5/7); Drop: Jacques-Louis Potgieter 36' (1/2)	Report; Scoreboard	Try: Stefan Watermeyer 13'; Willie Wepener 77'; Con: Marnitz Boshoff 14', 78' (2/2); Pen: Marnitz Boshoff 34' (1/2)	Attendance: 29,238; Referee: Chris Pollock

Bye/s: Sharks

=== Round 4 ===
7 March 2014	Hurricanes	21–29	Brumbies	Westpac Stadium, Wellington
19:35	Try: TJ Perenara 32'; Blade Thomson 78'; Con: Beauden Barrett 33' (1/2); Pen: Beauden Barrett 8', 20', 56' (3/3)	Report; Scoreboard	Try: Jesse Mogg 36'; Robbie Coleman 40'; Tevita Kuridrani 43'; Lachlan McCaffrey 72'; Con: Nic White 37', 44', 73' (3/4); Pen: Nic White 31' (1/1)	Attendance: 8,066; Referee: Craig Joubert

7 March 2014	Reds	43–33	Cheetahs	Suncorp Stadium, Brisbane
18:40	Try: penalty try 2'; Rod Davies 11'; Chris Feauai-Sautia 36', 54'; James Hanson 40'; Con: Quade Cooper 3', 12', 40' (3/5); Pen: Quade Cooper 22', 65', 70', 82' (4/5); Drop: Mike Harris (0/1)	Report; Scoreboard	Try: Francois Venter 4'; Boom Prinsloo 10'; Elgar Watts 73'; Con: Johan Goosen 5', 11' (2/2); Elgar Watts 74' (1/1); Pen: Johan Goosen 26', 40', 50', 59' (4/6); Cards: Rayno Benjamin (yellow card) 2' to 13'	Attendance: 27,670; Referee: Garratt Williamson

8 March 2014	Crusaders	14–13	Stormers	AMI Stadium, Christchurch
19:35	Try: Kieron Fonotia 69'; Con: Tom Taylor (0/1); Pen: Tom Taylor 5', 62', 75' (3/3)	Report; Scoreboard	Try: Damian de Allende 51'; Con: Demetri Catrakilis 52' (1/1); Pen: Demetri Catrakilis 35', 46' (2/2)	Attendance: 14,000; Referee: Rohan Hoffmann

8 March 2014	Western Force	32–7	Rebels	nib Stadium, Perth
16:40	Try: Alby Mathewson 2'; Luke Morahan 10'; Matt Hodgson 24'; Angus Cottrell 27'; Con: Sias Ebersohn 3', 11', 25' (3/4); Pen: Sias Ebersohn 17', 22' (2/4)	Report; Scoreboard	Try: Telusa Veainu 80'; Con: Bryce Hegarty 81' (1/1)	Attendance: 9,895; Referee: Nick Briant

8 March 2014	Bulls	38–22	Blues	Loftus Versfeld, Pretoria
17:05	Try: Jacques-Louis Potgieter 8'; Jono Ross 28'; Jan Serfontein 40'; Marcel van der Merwe 79'; Con: Jacques-Louis Potgieter 9', 29' (2/3); Handré Pollard 80' (1/1); Pen: Jacques-Louis Potgieter 20', 47', 67' (3/4); Drop: Jacques-Louis Potgieter 12' (1/2)	Report; Scoreboard	Try: Pita Ahki 57'; Con: Simon Hickey 58' (1/1); Pen: Simon Hickey 10', 15', 23', 32', 62' (5/5)	Attendance: 17,936; Referee: Andrew Lees

8 March 2014	Sharks	37–23	Lions	Growthpoint Kings Park, Durban
19:10	Try: Paul Jordaan 8'; Cobus Reinach 38'; Odwa Ndungane 50'; Marcell Coetzee 80'; Con: François Steyn 9', 39', 51', 81' (4/4); Pen: François Steyn 21', 24', 34' (3/3); Cards: Ryan Kankowski (yellow card) 64' to 74'	Report; Scoreboard	Try: Faf de Klerk 64'; Deon van Rensburg 68'; Con: Marnitz Boshoff 65', 69' (2/2); Pen: Marnitz Boshoff 12', 16', 37' (3/3); Cards: Corné Fourie (yellow card) 74'	Attendance: 28,158; Referee: Jaco Peyper

Bye/s: Chiefs, Highlanders, Waratahs

=== Round 5 ===
14 March 2014	Chiefs	36–20	Stormers	Waikato Stadium, Hamilton
19:35	Try: James Lowe 16'; Tom Marshall 40'; Tawera Kerr-Barlow 41'; Tevita Koloamatangi 77'; Tanerau Latimer 81'; Con: Aaron Cruden 17', 40', 42', 78' (4/4); Tanerau Latimer (0/1); Pen: Aaron Cruden 5' (1/2)	Report; Scoreboard	Try: Gio Aplon 62'; Nizaam Carr 75'; Con: Peter Grant 63', 76' (2/2); Pen: Demetri Catrakilis 2', 20' (2/3)	Attendance: 14,088; Referee: Craig Joubert

14 March 2014	Rebels	19–25	Crusaders	AAMI Park, Melbourne
19:40	Try: Scott Fuglistaller 78'; Con: Bryce Hegarty 79' (1/1); Pen: Jason Woodward 3', 11', 40' (3/4); Bryce Hegarty 51' (1/1)	Report; Scoreboard	Try: Ben Funnell 56'; Con: Tom Taylor 57' (1/1); Pen: Tom Taylor 8', 13', 22', 28', 42', 70' (6/6)	Attendance: 13,942; Referee: James Leckie

15 March 2014	Hurricanes	60–27	Cheetahs	Westpac Stadium, Wellington
16:35	Try: Dane Coles 7'; Beauden Barrett 19', 45'; Chris Smylie 30'; James Marshall 39'; Jeremy Thrush 50'; Matt Proctor 62'; Conrad Smith 67'; Alapati Leiua 78'; Con: Beauden Barrett 8', 20', 40', 46', 51' (5/8); Marty Banks 79' (1/1); Pen: Beauden Barrett 25' (1/2)	Report; Scoreboard	Try: Willie le Roux 10'; Philip van der Walt 27'; Francois Uys 52'; Con: Johan Goosen 11', 28', 53' (3/3); Pen: Johan Goosen 13', 17' (2/3); Cards: Willie le Roux (yellow card) 44' to 55'	Attendance: 7,666; Referee: Angus Gardner

15 March 2014	Highlanders	29–31	Western Force	Forsyth Barr Stadium, Dunedin
19:35	Try: Shaun Treeby 32'; Malakai Fekitoa 60'; Hayden Parker 79'; Con: Lima Sopoaga 33' (1/2); Hayden Parker (0/1); Pen: Lima Sopoaga 10', 15', 18', 68' (4/5)	Report; Scoreboard	Try: Nathan Charles 4'; Sias Ebersohn 26'; Ben McCalman 39'; Junior Rasolea 56'; Con: Sias Ebersohn 5', 27', 40', 57' (4/4); Pen: Sias Ebersohn 45' (1/1); Cards: Ben McCalman (yellow card) 72'; Adam Coleman (yellow card) 72'	Attendance: 9,501; Referee: Glen Jackson

15 March 2014	Brumbies	28–23	Waratahs	GIO Stadium, Canberra
19:40	Try: Nic White 15'; Jesse Mogg 18'; Tevita Kuridrani 54'; Con: Nic White 16', 19' (2/3); Pen: Nic White 6', 40', 80' (3/3); Drop: Nic White (0/1); Cards: Matt To'omua (yellow card) 60' to 70'; Ruan Smith (yellow card) 72'	Report; Scoreboard	Try: Michael Hooper 63'; Israel Folau 74'; Con: Bernard Foley 64', 75' (2/2); Pen: Bernard Foley 4', 11', 27' (3/4)	Attendance: 17,016; Referee: Jaco Peyper

15 March 2014	Lions	39–36	Blues	Ellis Park Stadium, Johannesburg
15:00	Try: Faf de Klerk 34'; Courtnall Skosan 40'; Coenie van Wyk 60'; Con: Marnitz Boshoff 35', 40', 61' (3/3); Pen: Marnitz Boshoff 52', 68', 75', 78' (4/5); Drop: Marnitz Boshoff 39', 42' (2/2)	Report; Scoreboard	Try: Charles Piutau 55'; Bryn Hall 57'; Frank Halai 65'; George Moala 71'; Benji Marshall 80'; Con: Chris Noakes 58', 66' (2/3); Simon Hickey 72', 80' (2/2); Pen: Chris Noakes 46' (1/1); Cards: Charlie Faumuina (yellow card) 30' to 41'; Tom Donnelly (yellow card) 44' to 54'	Attendance: 17,824; Referee: Stuart Berry

15 March 2014	Sharks	35–20	Reds	Growthpoint Kings Park, Durban
17:05	Try: Willem Alberts 27'; Dale Chadwick 77'; Con: Patrick Lambie 28', 78' (2/2); Pen: François Steyn 10', 37' (2/2); Patrick Lambie 19', 23', 26', 34', 59' (5/5)	Report; Scoreboard	Try: Mike Harris 54'; Will Genia 63'; Con: Quade Cooper 55', 64' (2/2); Pen: Quade Cooper 3', 15' (2/2); Cards: Beau Robinson (yellow card) 67' to 78'	Attendance: 26,824; Referee: Lourens van der Merwe

Bye/s: Bulls

=== Round 6 ===
21 March 2014	Highlanders	35–31	Hurricanes	Forsyth Barr Stadium, Dunedin
19:35	Try: Phil Burleigh 50'; Patrick Osborne 56'; Con: Lima Sopoaga 51', 57' (2/2); Pen: Lima Sopoaga 8', 15', 18', 24', 26', 36', 55' (7/8); Cards: Jarrad Hoeata (yellow card) 69' to 79'	Report; Scoreboard	Try: Ben Franks 63'; Beauden Barrett 73', 80'; Con: Beauden Barrett 64', 74' (2/3); Pen: Beauden Barrett 9', 22', 30', 46' (4/4)	Attendance: 11,259; Referee: Nick Briant

21 March 2014	Waratahs	32–8	Rebels	Allianz Stadium, Sydney
19:40	Try: Alofa Alofa 3'; Peter Betham 43'; Israel Folau 49', 74'; Con: Bernard Foley 44', 50', 75' (3/4); Pen: Bernard Foley 30', 37' (2/2)	Report; Scoreboard	Try: Scott Higginbotham 28'; Con: Bryce Hegarty (0/1); Pen: Bryce Hegarty 35' (1/2); Cards: Angus Roberts (yellow card) 54' to 64'	Attendance: 16,606; Referee: Jaco Peyper

22 March 2014	Blues	40–30	Cheetahs	Eden Park, Auckland
19:35	Try: Steve Luatua 16'; George Moala 30'; Tevita Li 32'; Tony Woodcock 65'; Con: Simon Hickey 17', 31', 33', 66' (4/4); Pen: Simon Hickey 8', 11', 29', 72' (4/5)	Report; Scoreboard	Try: Boom Prinsloo 20'; Cornal Hendricks 60'; Hennie Daniller 68'; Con: Johan Goosen 21' (1/1); Elgar Watts 61', 69' (2/2); Pen: Johan Goosen 5', 9' (2/2); Elgar Watts 40' (1/1); Cards: Boom Prinsloo (yellow card) 25' to 37'	Attendance: 13,500; Referee: Francisco Pastrana (Argentina)

22 March 2014	Brumbies	25–15	Stormers	GIO Stadium, Canberra
19:40	Try: Robbie Coleman 9', 62'; penalty try 80'; Con: Nic White 10', 81' (2/3); Pen: Nic White 32', 39' (2/4)	Report; Scoreboard	Try: Duane Vermeulen 22'; Juan de Jongh 75'; Con: Peter Grant 23' (1/2); Pen: Peter Grant 7' (1/3); Cards: Tiaan Liebenberg (yellow card) 31' to 42'	Attendance: 11,275; Referee: Glen Jackson

22 March 2014	Western Force	18–15	Chiefs	nib Stadium, Perth
19:00	Try: Matt Hodgson 13', 46'; Con: Sias Ebersohn 47' (1/2); Pen: Sias Ebersohn 26', 58' (2/3)	Report; Scoreboard	Pen: Aaron Cruden 18', 31', 40', 62' (4/4); Gareth Anscombe 44' (1/1); Cards: Michael Fitzgerald (yellow card) 36' to 47'	Attendance: 16,380; Referee: Lourens van der Merwe

22 March 2014	Lions	23–20	Reds	Ellis Park Stadium, Johannesburg
17:05	Try: Lionel Mapoe 65'; Courtnall Skosan 77'; Con: Marnitz Boshoff 66', 78' (2/2); Pen: Marnitz Boshoff 14', 40', 53' (3/3); Drop: Marnitz Boshoff (0/1)	Report; Scoreboard	Try: Quade Cooper 6', 32'; Con: Quade Cooper 7', 33' (2/2); Pen: Quade Cooper 3', 17' (2/2); Cards: James Hanson (yellow card) 70'; Jake Schatz (yellow card) 74'	Attendance: 20,758; Referee: Stuart Berry

22 March 2014	Bulls	23–19	Sharks	Loftus Versfeld, Pretoria
19:10	Try: Jacques du Plessis 48'; JJ Engelbrecht 53'; Con: Jacques-Louis Potgieter 49', 54' (2/2); Pen: Jacques-Louis Potgieter 15' (1/1); Handré Pollard 79' (1/1); Drop: Jacques-Louis Potgieter 22' (1/2); Handré Pollard (0/1)	Report; Scoreboard	Try: Willem Alberts 8'; Con: Tim Swiel 9' (1/1); Pen: François Steyn 37', 40', 67', 70' (4/5); Drop: François Steyn (0/2)	Attendance: 48,728; Referee: Mike Fraser

Bye/s: Crusaders

=== Round 7 ===
28 March 2014	Crusaders	26–29	Hurricanes	AMI Stadium, Christchurch
19:35	Try: Johnny McNicholl 25', 33'; Colin Slade 57'; Con: Tom Taylor 26' (1/3); Pen: Tom Taylor 18', 40', 65' (3/4)	Report; Scoreboard	Try: Faifili Levave 9'; TJ Perenara 20'; Julian Savea 43'; Alapati Leiua 74'; Con: Beauden Barrett 10', 21', 44' (3/4); Pen: Beauden Barrett 6' (1/3)	Attendance: 17,300; Referee: Nick Briant

28 March 2014	Rebels	32–24	Brumbies	AAMI Park, Melbourne
19:40	Try: Jason Woodward 59'; Mitch Inman 70'; Con: Jason Woodward 60', 71' (2/2); Pen: Jason Woodward 6', 44', 51', 56', 67', 80' (6/6)	Report; Scoreboard	Try: Jesse Mogg 3'; penalty try 47'; Robbie Coleman 78'; Con: Nic White 4', 48' (2/2); Matt To'omua 78' (1/1); Pen: Nic White 11' (1/1); Cards: Scott Fardy (yellow card) 65' to 75'	Attendance: 10,726; Referee: Jaco Peyper

29 March 2014	Blues	30–12	Highlanders	Eden Park, Auckland
19:35	Try: George Moala 11'; Ma'a Nonu 36'; Charles Piutau 49'; Con: Simon Hickey 12', 37', 50' (3/3); Pen: Simon Hickey 32', 45', 59' (3/5)	Report; Scoreboard	Pen: Lima Sopoaga 14', 24', 28', 47' (4/4)	Attendance: 16,700; Referee: Steve Walsh

29 March 2014	Reds	22–17	Stormers	Suncorp Stadium, Brisbane
18:40	Try: Rob Simmons 25'; Con: Quade Cooper 26' (1/1); Pen: Quade Cooper 20', 36', 57', 71' (4/6); Drop: Quade Cooper 67' (1/1)	Report; Scoreboard	Try: Damian de Allende 10'; Sikhumbuzo Notshe 74'; Con: Peter Grant 11' (1/1); Demetri Catrakilis 75' (1/1); Pen: Peter Grant 38' (1/2)	Attendance: 28,060; Referee: Chris Pollock

29 March 2014	Bulls	34–34	Chiefs	Loftus Versfeld, Pretoria
15:00	Try: Deon Stegmann 30'; penalty try 45'; Bjorn Basson 49'; Con: Jacques-Louis Potgieter 46', 50' (2/3); Pen: Jacques-Louis Potgieter 10', 23', 40', 55', 75' (5/5); Drop: Jacques-Louis Potgieter (0/1)	Report; Scoreboard	Try: Mils Muliaina 14'; Liam Messam 18'; Gareth Anscombe 70'; Matt Symons 76'; Aaron Cruden 80'; Con: Aaron Cruden 19' (1/2); Gareth Anscombe 71', 81' (2/3); Pen: Aaron Cruden 37' (1/3); Cards: Matt Symons (yellow card) 46' to 56'	Attendance: 24,164; Referee: Craig Joubert

29 March 2014	Sharks	32–10	Waratahs	Growthpoint Kings Park, Durban
17:05	Try: Marcell Coetzee 50'; Keegan Daniel 72'; Con: Fred Zeilinga 51', 73' (2/2); Pen: Fred Zeilinga 10', 17', 22', 65', 80' (5/5); François Steyn 38' (1/2)	Report; Scoreboard	Try: Bernard Foley 78'; Con: Bernard Foley 79' (1/1); Pen: Bernard Foley 4' (1/3); Cards: Dave Dennis (yellow card) 49' to 59'	Attendance: 31,829; Referee: Mike Fraser

Bye/s: Cheetahs, Western Force, Lions

=== Round 8 ===
4 April 2014	Highlanders	33–30	Rebels	Forsyth Barr Stadium, Dunedin
19:35	Try: Shane Christie 15'; Aaron Smith 18'; Ben Smith 53'; Con: Lima Sopoaga 16', 19', 54' (3/3); Pen: Lima Sopoaga 10', 33', 48', 65' (4/6)	Report; Scoreboard	Try: Scott Fuglistaller 7'; Angus Roberts 45'; Jason Woodward 77'; Con: Jason Woodward 8', 46', 78' (3/3); Pen: Jason Woodward 17', 37', 59' (3/3)	Attendance: 9,501; Referee: Chris Pollock

4 April 2014	Brumbies	26–9	Blues	Canberra Stadium, Canberra
19:40	Try: Pat McCabe 8', 52'; Robbie Coleman 57'; Con: Nic White 8' (1/3); Pen: Christian Lealiifano 70' (1/1); Nic White 11', 21' (2/3)	Report; Scoreboard	Pen: Simon Hickey 10', 40', 44' (3/4)	Attendance: 7,129; Referee: Rohan Hoffmann

5 April 2014	Hurricanes	25–20	Bulls	McLean Park, Napier
19:35	Try: Andre Taylor 16'; Con: Beauden Barrett 17' (1/1); Pen: Beauden Barrett 10', 22', 34', 65', 73', 82' (6/6)	Report; Scoreboard	Try: Jurgen Visser 35'; Handré Pollard 67'; Con: Jacques-Louis Potgieter 36' (1/1); Handré Pollard 68' (1/1); Pen: Jacques-Louis Potgieter 18', 28' (2/2); Handré Pollard (0/1); Drop: Jurgen Visser (0/1)	Attendance: 9,500; Referee: Steve Walsh

5 April 2014	Reds	29–32	Western Force	Suncorp Stadium, Brisbane
18:40	Try: Ben Tapuai 25'; James Slipper 33'; Con: Quade Cooper 26', 34' (2/2); Pen: Quade Cooper 40' (1/2); Mike Harris 55', 64', 71', 75' (4/4); Drop: Quade Cooper (0/1)	Report; Scoreboard	Try: Ben McCalman 38'; Luke Morahan 61'; Jayden Hayward 78'; Con: Sias Ebersohn (0/1); Jayden Hayward 79' (1/2); Pen: Sias Ebersohn 10', 15', 18', 21' (4/6); Drop: Sias Ebersohn 69' (1/1); Cards: Angus Cottrell (yellow card) 24' to 34'	Attendance: 27,024; Referee: Garratt Williamson

5 April 2014	Cheetahs	43–43	Chiefs	Free State Stadium, Bloemfontein
15:00	Try: Sarel Pretorius 7', 35'; Rayno Benjamin 15'; Boom Prinsloo 38'; Con: Johan Goosen 8', 16', 36', 39' (4/4); Pen: Johan Goosen 19', 30', 55', 72', 78' (5/7); Drop: Johan Goosen (0/1)	Report; Scoreboard	Try: Augustine Pulu 27', 52'; Tim Nanai-Williams 60', 82'; Asaeli Tikoirotuma 63', 70'; Con: Aaron Cruden 28', 53', 64', 70', 83' (5/6); Pen: Aaron Cruden 13' (1/1); Asaeli Tikoirotuma (0/1)	Attendance: 14,993; Referee: Craig Joubert

5 April 2014	Lions	7–28	Crusaders	Ellis Park Stadium, Johannesburg
17:05	Try: Lionel Mapoe 51'; Con: Marnitz Boshoff 52' (1/1); Pen: Marnitz Boshoff (0/1); Drop: Marnitz Boshoff (0/1)	Report; Scoreboard	Try: Ryan Crotty 45'; Andy Ellis 73'; Kieron Fonotia 80'; Con: Colin Slade 46' (1/1); Tyler Bleyendaal 74' (1/2); Pen: Colin Slade 10', 14' (2/4); Israel Dagg 69' (1/1)	Attendance: 20,000; Referee: Marius van der Westhuizen

5 April 2014	Stormers	11–22	Waratahs	DHL Newlands, Cape Town
19:10	Try: Kobus van Wyk 21'; Con: Peter Grant (0/1); Pen: Peter Grant 12', 56' (2/3); Jaco Taute (0/1)	Report; Scoreboard	Try: Nick Phipps 14'; Con: Bernard Foley 15' (1/1); Pen: Bernard Foley 34', 49', 68' (3/3); Kurtley Beale 46', 63' (2/2)	Attendance: 25,284; Referee: Glen Jackson

Bye/s: Sharks

=== Round 9 ===
11 April 2014	Highlanders	27–20	Bulls	Forsyth Barr Stadium, Dunedin
19:35	Try: Lima Sopoaga 33'; Gareth Evans 45'; Malakai Fekitoa 54'; Con: Lima Sopoaga 34', 46', 55' (3/3); Pen: Lima Sopoaga 20', 37' (2/2)	Report; Scoreboard	Try: Bjorn Basson 22'; Marcel van der Merwe 81'; Con: Jacques-Louis Potgieter 23', 82' (2/2); Pen: Jacques-Louis Potgieter 4', 12' (2/2)	Attendance: 10,090; Referee: Rohan Hoffmann

11 April 2014	Reds	20–23	Brumbies	Suncorp Stadium, Brisbane
19:40	Try: Beau Robinson 33'; Eddie Quirk 63'; Con: Quade Cooper 34', 64' (2/2); Pen: Quade Cooper 12', 69' (2/2)	Report; Scoreboard	Try: Scott Fardy 9'; Joe Tomane 30'; Con: Nic White 10', 31' (2/2); Pen: Nic White 15', 23', 44' (3/4)	Attendance: 30,004; Referee: Steve Walsh

12 April 2014	Chiefs	22–16	Rebels	Waikato Stadium, Hamilton
19:35	Try: Michael Fitzgerald 15'; Con: Gareth Anscombe 16' (1/1); Pen: Gareth Anscombe 3', 8', 12', 25', 58' (5/5); Cards: Pauliasi Manu (yellow card) 76'	Report; Scoreboard	Try: Shota Horie 44'; Con: Jason Woodward 45' (1/1); Pen: Jason Woodward 28', 40', 65' (3/4); Cards: Scott Higginbotham (yellow card) 55' to 66'	Attendance: 11,845; Referee: Matt O'Brien

12 April 2014	Western Force	28–16	Waratahs	nib Stadium, Perth
17:40	Try: Nick Cummins 26', 50', 61'; Con: Sias Ebersohn 27', 62' (2/3); Pen: Sias Ebersohn 16', 40', 76' (3/3)	Report; Scoreboard	Try: Kurtley Beale 66'; Con: Bernard Foley 67' (1/1); Pen: Kurtley Beale 9', 11' (2/3); Bernard Foley 30' (1/1)	Attendance: 14,281; Referee: Angus Gardner

12 April 2014	Cheetahs	31–52	Crusaders	Free State Stadium, Bloemfontein
17:05	Try: Cornal Hendricks 17'; Sarel Pretorius 50'; Oupa Mohojé 54'; Willie le Roux 59'; Con: Elgar Watts 18', 51', 55', 60' (4/4); Pen: Elgar Watts 33' (1/2)	Report; Scoreboard	Try: Israel Dagg 28'; Nemani Nadolo 41', 68', 81'; Tom Taylor 64'; Colin Slade 78'; Con: Colin Slade 29', 42', 65', 79' (4/5); Tyler Bleyendaal 82' (1/1); Pen: Colin Slade 11', 23', 36', 38' (4/5)	Attendance: 15,028; Referee: Glen Jackson

12 April 2014	Lions	12–25	Sharks	Ellis Park Stadium, Johannesburg
19:10	Pen: Marnitz Boshoff 19', 33', 58', 65' (4/4); Drop: Marnitz Boshoff (0/1)	Report; Scoreboard	Try: Lwazi Mvovo 67'; Con: François Steyn 68' (1/1); Pen: Fred Zeilinga 4', 6' (2/3); François Steyn 48', 51', 63', 72' (4/6); Drop: François Steyn (0/2); Cards: Jannie du Plessis (yellow card) 18' to 28'	Attendance: 48,943; Referee: Craig Joubert

Bye/s: Blues, Hurricanes, Stormers

=== Round 10 ===
18 April 2014	Hurricanes	39–20	Blues	Westpac Stadium, Wellington
19:35	Try: Alapati Leiua 14'; Julian Savea 49'; TJ Perenara 51'; Conrad Smith 64'; Motu Matu'u 80'; Con: Beauden Barrett 15', 50', 52', 65' (4/5); Pen: Beauden Barrett 7', 11' (2/3); Cards: Dane Coles (yellow card) 40' to 50'	Report; Scoreboard	Try: George Moala 29'; penalty try 40'; Con: Chris Noakes 30' (1/1); Benji Marshall 40' (1/1); Pen: Chris Noakes 3' (1/1); Benji Marshall 56' (1/1)	Attendance: 11,232; Referee: Nick Briant

18 April 2014	Rebels	22–16	Western Force	AAMI Park, Melbourne
19:40	Try: Scott Higginbotham 61'; Con: Jason Woodward 62' (1/1); Pen: Jason Woodward 13', 26', 45', 55', 76' (5/7); Cards: Tamati Ellison (yellow card) 82'	Report; Scoreboard	Try: Nick Cummins 82'; Con: Zack Holmes 83' (1/1); Pen: Sias Ebersohn 5', 19', 51' (3/3); Drop: Sias Ebersohn (0/1)	Attendance: 10,124; Referee: Andrew Lees

19 April 2014	Chiefs	17–18	Crusaders	Waikato Stadium, Hamilton
19:35	Try: Tom Marshall 40'; Con: Gareth Anscombe (0/1); Pen: Gareth Anscombe 14', 29', 32', 38' (4/5)	Report; Scoreboard	Pen: Colin Slade 5', 10', 16', 50', 69', 72' (6/8); Cards: Dominic Bird (yellow card) 28' to 39'	Attendance: 17,097; Referee: Garratt Williamson

19 April 2014	Waratahs	19–12	Bulls	Allianz Stadium, Sydney
19:40	Try: Israel Folau 1'; Con: Bernard Foley 2' (1/1); Pen: Kurtley Beale (0/1); Bernard Foley 18', 23', 63', 66' (4/6)	Report; Scoreboard	Pen: Jacques-Louis Potgieter 39', 40', 47' (3/3); Handré Pollard 78' (1/1); Drop: Jacques-Louis Potgieter (0/1); Cards: Grant Hattingh (yellow card) 65' to 76'	Attendance: 15,773; Referee: Rohan Hoffmann

19 April 2014	Sharks	19–8	Cheetahs	Growthpoint Kings Park, Durban
15:00	Try: Jean Deysel 71'; Con: François Steyn 72' (1/1); Pen: Tim Swiel 32' (1/3); François Steyn 46', 51', 62' (3/4); Drop: François Steyn (0/1)	Report; Scoreboard	Try: Rayno Benjamin 66'; Con: Elgar Watts (0/1); Pen: Elgar Watts 6' (1/2); Cards: Heinrich Brüssow (yellow card) 62' to 72'	Attendance: 34,634; Referee: Jaco Peyper

19 April 2014	Stormers	18–3	Lions	DHL Newlands, Cape Town
17:05	Try: Damian de Allende 29'; Nizaam Carr 34'; Con: Peter Grant 35' (1/2); Pen: Demetri Catrakilis 3' (1/1); Peter Grant 15' (1/2); Cards: Deon Fourie (yellow card) 25' to 35'	Report; Scoreboard	Pen: Marnitz Boshoff 44' (1/2)	Attendance: 28,385; Referee: Stuart Berry

Bye/s: Brumbies, Highlanders, Reds

=== Round 11 ===
25 April 2014	Blues	21–13	Waratahs	Eden Park, Auckland
17:35	Try: Lolagi Visinia 21'; Francis Saili 53'; Con: Simon Hickey 54' (1/2); Pen: Simon Hickey 8', 47', 72' (3/3)	Report; Scoreboard	Try: Jacques Potgieter 58'; Con: Bernard Foley 59' (1/1); Pen: Bernard Foley 35', 69' (2/4)	Attendance: 17,111; Referee: Chris Pollock

25 April 2014	Brumbies	41–23	Chiefs	GIO Stadium, Canberra
17:40	Try: Matt To'omua 30', 81'; Joe Tomane 47'; Tevita Kuridrani 57', 61'; Con: Christian Lealiifano 31' (1/4); Nic White 62' (1/1); Pen: Christian Lealiifano 18', 37' (2/3); Nic White 54', 64' (2/2)	Report; Scoreboard	Try: Brad Weber 74'; Josh Hohneck 79'; Con: Andrew Horrell 74', 80' (2/2); Pen: Gareth Anscombe 10', 25', 45' (3/4); Cards: James Lowe (yellow card) 53' to 63'	Attendance: 16,159; Referee: Steve Walsh

25 April 2014	Sharks	18–34	Highlanders	Growthpoint Kings Park, Durban
19:10	Pen: Tim Swiel 7', 13', 21', 40', 44', 50' (6/8); Drop: François Steyn (0/1)	Report; Scoreboard	Try: Richard Buckman 17'; Aaron Smith 27'; Shane Christie 33'; Malakai Fekitoa 69'; Con: Lima Sopoaga 18', 28', 34', 70' (4/4); Pen: Lima Sopoaga 3', 67' (2/2); Cards: Joe Wheeler (yellow card) 50' to 60'	Attendance: 22,348; Referee: Jaco Peyper

26 April 2014	Hurricanes	35–21	Reds	Westpac Stadium, Wellington
19:35	Try: Cory Jane 17', 23', 58'; TJ Perenara 47'; Ardie Savea 76'; Con: Beauden Barrett 48', 77' (2/5); Pen: Beauden Barrett 79' (1/2); Drop: Beauden Barrett 63' (1/2)	Report; Scoreboard	Try: Ben Lucas 7'; James Hanson 67'; Con: Quade Cooper 68' (1/2); Pen: Quade Cooper 22', 29', 40' (3/3)	Attendance: 10,369; Referee: Mike Fraser

26 April 2014	Western Force	15–9	Bulls	nib Stadium, Perth
17:40	Pen: Sias Ebersohn 26', 33', 40', 44', 60' (5/5)	Report; Scoreboard	Pen: Jacques-Louis Potgieter 5', 14' (2/2); Handré Pollard 63' (1/1); Drop: Jacques-Louis Potgieter (0/1)	Attendance: 14,227; Referee: Angus Gardner

26 April 2014	Cheetahs	35–22	Stormers	Free State Stadium, Bloemfontein
17:05	Try: Hennie Daniller 14'; Rayno Benjamin 17'; Willie le Roux 33'; Cornal Hendricks 71'; Trevor Nyakane 75'; Con: Elgar Watts 34', 72' (2/5); Pen: Elgar Watts 28', 56' (2/3)	Report; Scoreboard	Try: Nizaam Carr 4'; Devon Williams 61'; Jean de Villiers 79'; Con: Peter Grant 5' (1/2); Kurt Coleman 80' (1/1); Pen: Peter Grant 11' (1/2)	Attendance: 17,845; Referee: Craig Joubert

Bye/s: Crusaders, Lions, Rebels

=== Round 12 ===
2 May 2014	Blues	44–14	Reds	Eden Park, Auckland
19:35	Try: Jackson Willison 31'; Lolagi Visinia 39'; Bryn Hall 43'; Tom Donnelly 51'; Ihaia West 78'; Con: Simon Hickey 32', 40', 44', 52' (4/4); Ihaia West 79' (1/1); Pen: Simon Hickey 59', 7', 12' (3/3); Cards: Tony Woodcock (yellow card) 52' to 61'	Report; Scoreboard	Try: Ben Daley 53'; James Horwill 65'; Con: Quade Cooper 54', 66' (2/2); Pen: Quade Cooper (0/2); Cards: James Slipper (yellow card) 35' to 45'	Attendance: 14,050; Referee: Nick Briant

2 May 2014	Rebels	16–22	Sharks	AAMI Park, Melbourne
19:40	Try: Patrick Leafa 70'; Con: Jason Woodward 71' (1/1); Pen: Jason Woodward 20', 28', 55' (3/3)	Report; Scoreboard	Try: JP Pietersen 64'; Con: François Steyn 65' (1/1); Pen: François Steyn 21', 26', 30', 35', 38' (5/5)	Attendance: 10,002; Referee: Andrew Lees

3 May 2014	Crusaders	40–20	Brumbies	AMI Stadium, Christchurch
16:35	Try: Johnny McNicholl 40'; Nemani Nadolo 53'; Luke Whitelock 75'; Con: Colin Slade 40' (1/2); Willi Heinz 76' (1/1); Pen: Colin Slade 8', 13', 20', 28', 39', 49', 59' (7/8); Cards: Luke Romano (yellow card) 68' to 79'	Report; Scoreboard	Try: Stephen Moore 42'; Pat McCabe 78'; Con: Christian Lealiifano 43' (1/1); Matt To'omua 79' (1/1); Pen: Nic White 15', 34' (2/2); Christian Lealiifano (0/1)	Attendance: 17,300; Referee: Glen Jackson

3 May 2014	Chiefs	38–8	Lions	Waikato Stadium, Hamilton
19:35	Try: Gareth Anscombe 23'; Tanerau Latimer 38'; Charlie Ngatai 40'; Pauliasi Manu 44'; Bundee Aki 72'; Tim Nanai-Williams 76'; Con: Gareth Anscombe 24', 40', 45' (3/4); Andrew Horrell 77' (1/2); Pen: Gareth Anscombe (0/1)	Report; Scoreboard	Try: Courtnall Skosan 47'; Con: Elton Jantjies (0/1); Pen: Elton Jantjies 9' (1/2)	Attendance: 11,168; Referee: Chris Pollock

3 May 2014	Waratahs	39–30	Hurricanes	Allianz Stadium, Sydney
19:40	Try: Rob Horne 2'; Dave Dennis 31'; Bernard Foley 35'; Matthew Carraro 54'; Stephen Hoiles 65'; Con: Bernard Foley 3', 32', 36', 55' (4/5); Pen: Bernard Foley 40', 76' (2/2)	Report; Scoreboard	Try: Jeffery Toomaga-Allen 13'; Beauden Barrett 25'; Julian Savea 27'; Con: Beauden Barrett 14', 26', 28' (3/3); Pen: Beauden Barrett 23', 59', 63' (3/3)	Attendance: 17,221; Referee: Steve Walsh

3 May 2014	Stormers	29–28	Highlanders	DHL Newlands, Cape Town
15:00	Try: Frans Malherbe 2', 28'; Damian de Allende 34'; Oli Kebble 48'; Con: Kurt Coleman 3', 29', 49' (3/4); Pen: Kurt Coleman (0/1); Peter Grant 66' (1/1); Cards: Scarra Ntubeni (yellow card) 53' to 63'	Report; Scoreboard	Try: Aaron Smith 7'; Trent Renata 37'; Ben Smith 54'; Malakai Fekitoa 58'; Con: Lima Sopoaga 8', 38' (2/2); Trent Renata 55', 59' (2/2); Cards: Brayden Mitchell (yellow card) 66' to 76'	Attendance: 21,287; Referee: Craig Joubert

3 May 2014	Bulls	26–21	Cheetahs	Loftus Versfeld, Pretoria
17:05	Try: Paul Willemse 45'; Callie Visagie 55'; Con: Handré Pollard 46', 56' (2/2); Pen: Handré Pollard 7', 37' (2/2); Jurgen Visser 29' (1/1); Jacques-Louis Potgieter 67' (1/1); Cards: Handré Pollard (yellow card) 22' to 32'	Report; Scoreboard	Try: Johann Sadie 18'; Raymond Rhule 40'; Con: Elgar Watts 19' (1/2); Pen: Elgar Watts 9', 23' (2/2) Willie le Roux (0/1); Johan Goosen 52' (1/2)	Attendance: 29,133; Referee: Marius van der Westhuizen

Bye/s: Western Force

=== Round 13 ===
9 May 2014	Chiefs	32–20	Blues	Yarrow Stadium, New Plymouth
19:35	Try: Ben Tameifuna 11', 43'; Tim Nanai-Williams 21'; Tom Marshall 51'; Con: Gareth Anscombe 12', 22', 52' (3/4); Pen: Gareth Anscombe 29', 40' (2/3); Cards: Tim Nanai-Williams (yellow card) 65' to 75'	Report; Scoreboard	Try: Lolagi Visinia 7'; George Moala 68'; Con: Simon Hickey 8' (1/1); Ihaia West 69' (1/1); Pen: Simon Hickey 31', 36' (2/2)	Attendance: 10,888; Referee: Mike Fraser

9 May 2014	Rebels	15–25	Hurricanes	AAMI Park, Melbourne
19:40	Try: Bryce Hegarty 28'; Tamati Ellison 72'; Con: Jason Woodward 29' (1/2); Pen: Jason Woodward 22' (1/4)	Report; Scoreboard	Try: Conrad Smith 57'; Con: Beauden Barrett 58' (1/1); Pen: Beauden Barrett 4', 11', 18', 35', 42', 51' (6/8); Cards: Conrad Smith (yellow card) 68' to 78'	Attendance: 12,072; Referee: Matt O'Brien

10 May 2014	Highlanders	23–22	Lions	Forsyth Barr Stadium, Dunedin
19:35	Try: Richard Buckman 3', 37'; Gareth Evans 40'; Con: Hayden Parker 4' (1/3); Pen: Hayden Parker 23' (1/1); Drop: Hayden Parker 26' (1/1); Cards: Chris King (yellow card) 54' to 64'	Report; Scoreboard	Try: Faf de Klerk 43'; Lionel Mapoe 67'; Akker van der Merwe 71'; Courtnall Skosan 79'; Con: Marnitz Boshoff 44' (1/3); Elton Jantjies (0/1); Drop: Marnitz Boshoff (0/1)	Referee: Angus Gardner

10 May 2014	Brumbies	16–9	Sharks	GIO Stadium, Canberra
19:40	Try: Sam Carter 63'; Con: Christian Lealiifano 64' (1/1); Pen: Christian Lealiifano 2', 37', 48' (3/6); Nic White (0/1)	Report; Scoreboard	Pen: François Steyn 15', 45', 72' (3/6)	Attendance: 11,615; Referee: Glen Jackson

10 May 2014	Cheetahs	16–23	Western Force	Free State Stadium, Bloemfontein
17:05	Try: Boom Prinsloo 46'; Con: Johan Goosen 47' (1/1); Pen: Johan Goosen 11', 40', 57' (3/4)	Report; Scoreboard	Try: Jayden Hayward 23'; Nick Cummins 53'; Con: Sias Ebersohn 24', 54' (2/2); Pen: Sias Ebersohn 3', 21', 38' (3/3); Cards: Matt Hodgson (yellow card) 45' to 55'	Attendance: 13,845; Referee: Chris Pollock

10 May 2014	Bulls	28–12	Stormers	Loftus Versfeld, Pretoria
19:10	Try: Akona Ndungane 66'; Con: Handré Pollard 67' (1/1); Pen: Handré Pollard 23', 29', 39', 43', 55' (5/5); Jacques-Louis Potgieter 70' (1/1); Drop: Handré Pollard 26' (1/1)	Report; Scoreboard	Try: Kurt Coleman 11'; Juan de Jongh 19'; Con: Kurt Coleman 12' (1/2)	Attendance: 45,843; Referee: Craig Joubert

11 May 2014	Reds	29–57	Crusaders	Suncorp Stadium, Brisbane
16:05	Try: Jamie-Jerry Taulagi 20'; Dom Shipperley 23'; Rod Davies 64'; Rob Simmons 73'; Con: Quade Cooper 21', 24', 74' (3/4); Pen: Quade Cooper 4' (1/1)	Report; Scoreboard	Try: Nemani Nadolo 7', 59'; Wyatt Crockett 43'; Johnny McNicholl 45', 78'; Luke Whitelock 57'; Con: Colin Slade 8', 44', 46', 58', 60', 79' (6/6); Pen: Colin Slade 17', 28', 37', 52', 70' (5/5); Cards: Andy Ellis (yellow card) 15' to 25'	Attendance: 30,640; Referee: Jaco Peyper

Bye/s: Waratahs

=== Round 14 ===
16 May 2014	Hurricanes	16–18	Highlanders	Westpac Stadium, Wellington
19:35	Try: TJ Perenara 37'; Con: Andre Taylor 38' (1/1); Pen: Beauden Barrett 7', 28' (2/2); Andre Taylor 47' (1/3)	Report; Scoreboard	Pen: Hayden Parker 15', 21', 40', 44', 52' (5/5); Drop: Hayden Parker 65' (1/1)	Attendance: 13,019; Referee: Jaco Peyper

17 May 2014	Crusaders	25–30	Sharks	AMI Stadium, Christchurch
19:35	Try: Colin Slade 13'; Con: Colin Slade 14' (1/1); Pen: Colin Slade 17', 31', 48', 59', 65', 74' (6/9)	Report; Scoreboard	Try: S'bura Sithole 9'; Cobus Reinach 42'; Kyle Cooper 76'; Con: François Steyn 10', 43' (2/2); Tim Swiel 77' (1/1); Pen: François Steyn 40', 52' (2/3); Tim Swiel 69' (1/1); Drop: François Steyn (0/1); Cards: Jean Deysel (red card) 17'; Willem Alberts (yellow card) 64' to 74'	Referee: Rohan Hoffmann

17 May 2014	Reds	27–30	Rebels	Suncorp Stadium, Brisbane
19:40	Try: Mike Harris 3'; Greg Holmes 40'; Ben Lucas 67'; Con: Quade Cooper 4' (1/1); Mike Harris 40', 68' (2/2); Pen: Mike Harris 25', 75' (2/2); Cards: Ed O'Donoghue (red card) 79'	Report; Scoreboard	Try: Tom Kingston 15'; Luke Burgess 30', 42'; Con: Jason Woodward 16', 31', 43' (3/3); Pen: Jason Woodward 6', 71', 80' (3/4); Cards: Scott Higginbotham (yellow card) 1' to 11'	Attendance: 23,820; Referee: Steve Walsh

17 May 2014	Stormers	24–8	Western Force	DHL Newlands, Cape Town
17:05	Try: Juan de Jongh 19'; penalty try 39'; Ruan Botha 47'; Con: Peter Grant 20', 40', 48' (3/3); Pen: Peter Grant 16' (1/3); Cards: Cheslin Kolbe (yellow card) 68' to 78'; Jaco Taute (yellow card) 70' to 80'	Report; Scoreboard	Try: Matt Hodgson 71'; Con: Sias Ebersohn (0/1); Pen: Sias Ebersohn 22' (1/1); Cards: Adam Coleman (yellow card) 37' to 48'	Attendance: 22,856; Referee: Chris Pollock

17 May 2014	Cheetahs	27–21	Brumbies	Free State Stadium, Bloemfontein
19:10	Try: Willie le Roux 48'; Johan Goosen 52'; Con: Johan Goosen 53' (1/2); Pen: Johan Goosen 3', 7', 16', 60' (4/4); Drop: Johan Goosen 78' (1/2); Cards: Heinrich Brüssow (yellow card) 72'	Report; Scoreboard	Try: Robbie Coleman 32'; Stephen Moore 73'; Con: Nic White 74' (1/2); Pen: Christian Lealiifano (0/2); Nic White 21', 40', 62' (3/4); Cards: Scott Fardy (yellow card) 16' to 26'	Attendance: 12,382; Referee: Marius van der Westhuizen

18 May 2014	Waratahs	41–13	Lions	Allianz Stadium, Sydney
16:05	Try: Bernard Foley 9'; Kurtley Beale 25'; Rob Horne 44', 81'; Adam Ashley-Cooper 49'; Con: Bernard Foley 10', 25', 45', 50', 82' (5/5); Pen: Bernard Foley 19', 62' (2/2)	Report; Scoreboard	Try: Jaco Kriel 13'; Con: Marnitz Boshoff 14' (1/1); Pen: Marnitz Boshoff 22', 32' (2/3); Drop: Marnitz Boshoff (0/1); Cards: Deon van Rensburg (yellow card) 48' to 58'	Attendance: 19,639; Referee: Nick Briant

Bye/s: Blues, Bulls, Chiefs

=== Round 15 ===
23 May 2014	Blues	23–29	Sharks	QBE Stadium, Albany
19:35	Try: Luke Braid 43'; Tevita Li 67'; Con: Simon Hickey 43' (1/1); Ihaia West 68' (1/1); Pen: Simon Hickey 8', 18' (2/3); Ihaia West 73' (1/1)	Report; Scoreboard	Try: Bismarck du Plessis 11'; Cobus Reinach 55'; Con: François Steyn 12', 56' (2/2); Pen: François Steyn 6', 34', 51' (3/4); SP Marais 70' (1/1); Drop: François Steyn 27' (1/1); Cards: Jannie du Plessis (yellow card) 42' to 53'; François Steyn (yellow card) 62' to 72'	Attendance: 10,071; Referee: Nick Briant

23 May 2014	Rebels	19–41	Waratahs	AAMI Park, Melbourne
19:40	Try: Telusa Veainu 60'; Con: Jason Woodward 61' (1/1); Pen: Jason Woodward 15', 24', 26', 46' (4/5); Cards: Patrick Leafa (yellow card) 40' to 50'	Report; Scoreboard	Try: Rob Horne 11'; Adam Ashley-Cooper 37'; Michael Hooper 54'; Kurtley Beale 64'; Israel Folau 71'; Brendan McKibbin 78'; Con: Bernard Foley 65' (1/4); Kurtley Beale (0/2); Pen: Kurtley Beale (0/1); Bernard Foley 7', 29', 49' (3/4)	Attendance: 12,477; Referee: Rohan Hoffmann

23 May 2014	Bulls	44–23	Brumbies	Loftus Versfeld, Pretoria
19:10	Try: Jan Serfontein 8'; Jono Ross 25', 75'; Bjorn Basson 44'; Con: Jacques-Louis Potgieter 9', 26' (2/3); Handré Pollard 76' (1/1); Pen: Jacques-Louis Potgieter 13', 19', 39', 42', 51', 61' (6/8); Drop: Jacques-Louis Potgieter (0/1)	Report; Scoreboard	Try: Henry Speight 48'; Ben Mowen 68'; Tevita Kuridrani 79'; Con: Christian Lealiifano 49' (1/2); Matt To'omua (0/1); Pen: Christian Lealiifano 23', 35' (2/2); Cards: Matt To'omua (yellow card) 41' to 51'; Joshua Mann-Rea (yellow card) 74'	Attendance: 28,623; Referee: Craig Joubert

24 May 2014	Highlanders	30–32	Crusaders	Forsyth Barr Stadium, Dunedin
17:35	Try: Ged Robinson 24'; Patrick Osborne 28'; Malakai Fekitoa 68'; Ben Smith 73'; Con: Lima Sopoaga 29' (1/2); Hayden Parker 74' (1/2); Pen: Lima Sopoaga 49' (1/2); Hayden Parker 61' (1/1)	Report; Scoreboard	Try: Jordan Taufua 12'; Tim Perry 42'; Nepo Laulala 50'; Nemani Nadolo 64'; Con: Colin Slade 13', 51', 65' (3/4); Pen: Colin Slade 38', 70' (2/3); Cards: Richie McCaw (yellow card) 22' to 32'	Attendance: 21,305; Referee: Glen Jackson

24 May 2014	Hurricanes	45–8	Chiefs	Westpac Stadium, Wellington
19:35	Try: Andre Taylor 4'; Ben Franks 21'; Julian Savea 30', 51'; Jack Lam 63'; Brad Shields 72'; Con: Beauden Barrett 5', 22', 31', 52', 64', 73' (6/6); Pen: Beauden Barrett 47' (1/1); Cards: Reggie Goodes (yellow card) 55' to 65'	Report; Scoreboard	Try: Liam Squire 15'; Con: Gareth Anscombe (0/1); Pen: Gareth Anscombe 3' (1/1); Cards: Brodie Retallick (yellow card) 60' to 70'	Attendance: 10,334; Referee: Angus Gardner

24 May 2014	Western Force	29–19	Lions	nib Stadium, Perth
17:40	Try: Matt Hodgson 36', 79'; Dane Haylett-Petty 39'; Chris Tuatara-Morrison 74'; Con: Sias Ebersohn 37' (1/2); Jayden Hayward 75', 80' (2/2); Pen: Sias Ebersohn 3' (1/2)	Report; Scoreboard	Try: Elton Jantjies 78'; Con: Marnitz Boshoff 78' (1/1); Pen: Marnitz Boshoff 5', 19', 28', 65' (4/4); Drop: Marnitz Boshoff (0/1); Cards: Corné Fourie (yellow card) 35' to 45'	Attendance: 11,587; Referee: Steve Walsh

24 May 2014	Stormers	33–0	Cheetahs	DHL Newlands, Cape Town
17:05	Try: Deon Fourie 5'; Kobus van Wyk 33'; Siya Kolisi 70'; Sailosi Tagicakibau 76'; Con: Kurt Coleman 34' (1/2); Peter Grant 71' (1/2); Pen: Kurt Coleman 29', 50' (2/3); Peter Grant 62' (1/1); Drop: Jaco Taute (0/1); Cards: Michael Rhodes (yellow card) 74'	Report; Scoreboard	Cards: Adriaan Strauss (yellow card) 22' to 35'	Attendance: 15,819; Referee: Stuart Berry

Bye/s: Reds

=== Round 16 ===
30 May 2014	Crusaders	30–7	Western Force	AMI Stadium, Christchurch
19:35	Try: Johnny McNicholl 25'; penalty try 72', 83'; Con: Colin Slade 73', 84', 26' (3/3); Pen: Colin Slade 12', 23', 40' (3/3)	Report; Scoreboard	Try: Dane Haylett-Petty 48'; Con: Sias Ebersohn 49' (1/1); Cards: Sam Wykes (yellow card) 71'	Referee: Mike Fraser

30 May 2014	Reds	38–31	Highlanders	Suncorp Stadium, Brisbane
19:40	Try: Curtis Browning 13'; Rod Davies 29'; Dom Shipperley 33'; Jake Schatz 48', 83'; Con: Mike Harris 14', 30', 34', 49', 84' (5/5); Pen: Mike Harris 67' (1/1)	Report; Scoreboard	Try: Lima Sopoaga 44'; Richard Buckman 53'; Patrick Osborne 74'; Fumiaki Tanaka 79'; Con: Lima Sopoaga 45', 54' (2/2); Hayden Parker 75', 80' (2/2); Pen: Hayden Parker 63' (1/1)	Attendance: 24,490; Referee: Andrew Lees

31 May 2014	Chiefs	17–33	Waratahs	Yarrow Stadium, New Plymouth
16:35	Try: Bundee Aki 55', 62'; Con: Aaron Cruden 56', 63' (2/2); Pen: Aaron Cruden 3' (1/2)	Report; Scoreboard	Try: Israel Folau 15'; Dave Dennis 72'; Bernard Foley 80'; Con: Bernard Foley 16', 73', 81' (3/3); Pen: Bernard Foley 9', 27', 68' (3/3); Kurtley Beale 58' (1/1)	Attendance: 10,740; Referee: Chris Pollock

31 May 2014	Blues	37–24	Hurricanes	Eden Park, Auckland
19:35	Try: penalty try 14'; Lolagi Visinia 17'; Jerome Kaino 43'; George Moala 46'; Patrick Tuipulotu 66'; Con: Ihaia West 15', 44', 67' (3/5); Pen: Ihaia West 13', 72' (2/3)	Report; Scoreboard	Try: Faifili Levave 11', 78'; Julian Savea 58'; Ardie Savea 68'; Con: Beauden Barrett 12', 69' (2/4); Pen: Beauden Barrett (0/1); Cards: Matt Proctor (yellow card) 14' to 24'	Attendance: 17,857; Referee: Garratt Williamson

31 May 2014	Brumbies	37–10	Rebels	GIO Stadium, Canberra
19:40	Try: Matt To'omua 3', 16'; Pat McCabe 13'; Scott Sio 30'; Sam Carter 43'; Leon Power 79'; Con: Christian Lealiifano 14', 44' (2/6); Pen: Christian Lealiifano 39' (1/1); Cards: Ben Alexander (yellow card) 68' to 78'	Report; Scoreboard	Try: Scott Higginbotham 69'; Con: Jason Woodward 70' (1/1); Pen: Jason Woodward 7' (1/1)	Attendance: 11,071; Referee: Steve Walsh

31 May 2014	Lions	32–21	Bulls	Ellis Park Stadium, Johannesburg
17:05	Try: Alwyn Hollenbach 46'; Warwick Tecklenburg 69'; Con: Marnitz Boshoff 47', 70' (2/2); Pen: Marnitz Boshoff 5', 10', 58', 80' (4/4); Drop: Marnitz Boshoff 2', 56' (2/4)	Report; Scoreboard	Try: William Small-Smith 71'; Jacques du Plessis 74'; Con: Jacques-Louis Potgieter 75' (1/2); Pen: Jacques-Louis Potgieter 31', 37', 45' (3/4)	Attendance: 40,948; Referee: Craig Joubert

31 May 2014	Sharks	19–21	Stormers	Growthpoint Kings Park, Durban
19:10	Try: Cobus Reinach 39'; Con: François Steyn 40' (1/1); Pen: François Steyn 3', 10', 29', 48' (4/6); Drop: François Steyn (0/1); Cards: Marcell Coetzee (yellow card) 63' to 73'	Report; Scoreboard	Pen: Kurt Coleman 19', 25', 33', 44' (4/4); Demetri Catrakilis 54', 64' (2/2); Drop: Jaco Taute 81' (1/1); Cards: Nizaam Carr (yellow card) 10' to 20'	Attendance: 34,867; Referee: Jaco Peyper

Bye/s: Cheetahs

=== Round 17 ===
27 June 2014	Highlanders	29–25	Chiefs	Forsyth Barr Stadium, Dunedin
19:35	Try: Patrick Osborne 14'; Ben Smith 49'; Con: Lima Sopoaga 15', 50' (2/2); Pen: Lima Sopoaga 35', 43', 54', 60' (4/4); Hayden Parker 73' (1/1); Drop: Hayden Parker (0/1)	Report; Scoreboard	Try: Dwayne Sweeney 17'; Tim Nanai-Williams 67'; Josh Hohneck 76'; Con: Aaron Cruden 18', 76' (2/3); Pen: Aaron Cruden 7' (1/1); Gareth Anscombe 30' (1/1)	Referee: Garratt Williamson

27 June 2014	Rebels	20–36	Reds	AAMI Park, Melbourne
19:40	Try: Luke Burgess 52'; Bryce Hegarty 57'; Mitch Inman 82'; Con: Jason Woodward 83' (1/3); Pen: Jason Woodward 13' (1/1); Cards: Mitch Inman (yellow card) 30' to 40'	Report; Scoreboard	Try: Lachlan Turner 9', 48'; Mike Harris 24'; Nick Frisby 33', 39' Rod Davies 70'; Con: Mike Harris 10', 49', 71' (3/6); Pen: Mike Harris (0/1); Cards: Lachlan Turner (yellow card) 14' to 24'	Attendance: 10,473; Referee: Angus Gardner

28 June 2014	Hurricanes	16–9	Crusaders	Westpac Stadium, Wellington
19:35	Try: Blade Thomson 28', 73'; Con: Beauden Barrett (0/2); Pen: Beauden Barrett 9', 24' (2/3)	Report; Scoreboard	Pen: Colin Slade 12', 46', 53' (3/3); Drop: Dan Carter (0/1); Cards: Matt Todd (yellow card) 8' to 18'	Attendance: 15,502; Referee: Mike Fraser

28 June 2014	Waratahs	39–8	Brumbies	ANZ Stadium, Sydney
19:40	Try: Benn Robinson 16'; Alofa Alofa 19', 69'; Bernard Foley 61'; Wycliff Palu 80'; Con: Bernard Foley 17', 20', 62', 70' (4/4); Kurtley Beale (0/1); Pen: Bernard Foley 43' (1/2); Kurtley Beale 75' (1/2)	Report; Scoreboard	Try: Jesse Mogg 30'; Con: Christian Lealiifano (0/1); Pen: Christian Lealiifano 47' (1/2); Cards: Fotu Auelua (yellow card) 60' to 70'	Attendance: 29,132; Referee: Steve Walsh

28 June 2014	Western Force	14–40	Blues	nib Stadium, Perth
19:45	Try: Nathan Charles 65'; Brynard Stander 80'; Con: Jayden Hayward 66', 81' (2/2)	Report; Scoreboard	Try: Ihaia West 5'; Charlie Faumuina 10'; Lolagi Visinia 14'; Ma'a Nonu 18'; Luke Braid 56'; Pita Ahki 72'; Con: Ihaia West 6', 11', 19', 57', 73' (5/6); Pen: Ihaia West (0/1); Cards: Tom Donnelly (yellow card) 48' to 58'	Attendance: 13,331; Referee: Rohan Hoffmann

Bye/s: Bulls, Cheetahs, Lions, Sharks, Stormers

=== Round 18 ===
4 July 2014	Chiefs	24–16	Hurricanes	Waikato Stadium, Hamilton
19:35	Try: Jamie Mackintosh 28'; Brodie Retallick 62'; Con: Aaron Cruden 29' (1/2); Pen: Aaron Cruden 21', 37', 40', 58' (4/6)	Report; Scoreboard	Try: Hadleigh Parkes 65'; Con: Beauden Barrett 66' (1/1); Pen: Beauden Barrett 23', 34', 46' (3/5)	Referee: Nick Briant

4 July 2014	Lions	34–17	Rebels	Ellis Park Stadium, Johannesburg
19:10	Try: Anthony Volmink 2'; Warwick Tecklenburg 58'; Warren Whiteley 71'; Con: Marnitz Boshoff 59', 72' (2/3); Pen: Marnitz Boshoff 9', 31', 38', 65', 67' (5/6)	Report; Scoreboard	Try: Tom English 22'; Colby Fainga'a 51'; Con: Jack Debreczeni 23', 52' (2/2); Pen: Jack Debreczeni 35' (1/2); Cards: Scott Higginbotham (yellow card) 70'	Attendance: 8,285; Referee: Jaco Peyper

5 July 2014	Crusaders	21–13	Blues	AMI Stadium, Christchurch
19:35	Try: Nemani Nadolo 16', 73'; Con: Colin Slade (0/1); Dan Carter 74' (1/1); Pen: Colin Slade 12', 25' (2/4); Dan Carter 67' (1/1)	Report; Scoreboard	Try: Frank Halai 20'; Con: Ihaia West 21' (1/1); Pen: Ihaia West 15', 31' (2/2)	Referee: Glen Jackson

5 July 2014	Western Force	30–20	Reds	nib Stadium, Perth
17:40	Try: Nick Cummins 10'; Ben McCalman 19'; Nathan Charles 73'; Con: Jayden Hayward 11', 20', 74' (3/3); Pen: Jayden Hayward 15', 53', 70' (3/5); Cards: Hugh McMeniman (yellow card) 28' to 38'	Report; Scoreboard	Try: Samu Kerevi 37'; Albert Anae 58'; Con: Mike Harris 38', 59' (2/2); Pen: Mike Harris 7', 69' (2/2)	Attendance: 11,762; Referee: Angus Gardner

5 July 2014	Stormers	16–0	Bulls	DHL Newlands, Cape Town
17:05	Try: Jaco Taute 14'; Con: Kurt Coleman 15' (1/1); Pen: Kurt Coleman 5', 24', 39' (3/4)	Report; Scoreboard		Attendance: 35,073; Referee: Craig Joubert

5 July 2014	Cheetahs	27–20	Sharks	Free State Stadium, Bloemfontein
19:10	Try: Torsten van Jaarsveld 8'; Philip van der Walt 33'; Lood de Jager 49'; Con: Johan Goosen 9', 34', 49' (3/3); Pen: Johan Goosen 3', 56' (2/2); Cards: Johan Goosen (yellow card) 80'	Report; Scoreboard	Try: Cobus Reinach 22'; Bismarck du Plessis 74'; Con: Tim Swiel 23', 75' (2/2); Pen: Tim Swiel 19', 27' (2/3)	Attendance: 18,642; Referee: Rohan Hoffmann

6 July 2014	Waratahs	44–16	Highlanders	Allianz Stadium, Sydney
16:05	Try: Rob Horne 13'; Israel Folau 43'; Sekope Kepu 50'; Nick Phipps 65'; Jacques Potgieter 70'; Taqele Naiyaravoro 79'; Con: Bernard Foley 44', 66', 71', 80' (4/6); Pen: Bernard Foley 3', 29' (2/2)	Report; Scoreboard	Try: Phil Burleigh 73'; Con: Hayden Parker 74' (1/1); Pen: Lima Sopoaga 23', 32', 38' (3/4); Cards: Aaron Smith (yellow card) 13' to 24'	Attendance: 24,574; Referee: Steve Walsh

Bye/s: Brumbies

=== Round 19 ===
11 July 2014	Blues	8–11	Chiefs	Eden Park, Auckland
19:35	Try: George Moala 69'; Con: Ihaia West (0/1); Pen: Ihaia West 44' (1/2); Cards: Ma'a Nonu (yellow card) 36' to 47'	Report; Scoreboard	Try: Liam Messam 49'; Con: Aaron Cruden (0/1); Pen: Aaron Cruden 24', 62' (2/4); Gareth Anscombe (0/1); Cards: Michael Fitzgerald (yellow card) 66' to 76'	Referee: Glen Jackson

11 July 2014	Brumbies	47–25	Western Force	GIO Stadium, Canberra
19:40	Try: Matt To'omua 6', 26', 56'; Jesse Mogg 36'; Henry Speight 44'; Joe Tomane 68'; Tom McVerry 78'; Con: Christian Lealiifano 45', 57', 69' (3/7); Pen: Nic White (0/1); Christian Lealiifano 15', 24' (2/2); Cards: Jarrad Butler (yellow card) 54' to 65'	Report; Scoreboard	Try: Pekahou Cowan 54'; Chris Tuatara-Morrison 63'; Zack Holmes 73'; Con: Jayden Hayward 55' (1/2); Sias Ebersohn 74' (1/1); Pen: Jayden Hayward 18', 22' (2/3)	Attendance: 11,742; Referee: Steve Walsh

11 July 2014	Bulls	40–7	Rebels	Loftus Versfeld, Pretoria
19:10	Try: Paul Willemse 42', 52'; Francois Hougaard 58'; Dean Greyling 78'; Con: Handré Pollard 43', 53', 59' (3/3); Jacques-Louis Potgieter 79' (1/1); Pen: Handré Pollard 7', 20', 26', 31' (4/4); Cards: Paul Willemse (yellow card) 16' to 26'	Report; Scoreboard	Try: Jack Debreczeni 24'; Con: Jack Debreczeni 25' (1/1); Pen: Jack Debreczeni (0/3); Cards: Scott Fuglistaller (yellow card) 33' to 43'	Referee: Rohan Hoffmann

12 July 2014	Crusaders	34–8	Highlanders	AMI Stadium, Christchurch
19:35	Try: Matt Todd 40', 45'; Nemani Nadolo 47'; Corey Flynn 72'; Con: Dan Carter 46' (1/4); Pen: Dan Carter 4', 18', 32', 36' (4/5)	Report; Scoreboard	Try: Richard Buckman 66'; Con: Lima Sopoaga (0/1); Pen: Hayden Parker 21' (1/1)	Referee: Craig Joubert

12 July 2014	Reds	3–34	Waratahs	Suncorp Stadium, Brisbane
19:40	Pen: Mike Harris 4' (1/1); Cards: Sam Johnson (yellow card) 61' to 71'	Report; Scoreboard	Try: Jono Lance 12'; Kurtley Beale 16', 55'; Nick Phipps 74'; Con: Bernard Foley 14', 17', 56', 75' (4/4); Pen: Bernard Foley 40', 53' (2/4); Cards: Sekope Kepu (yellow card) 29' to 41'	Attendance: 36,205; Referee: Mike Fraser

12 July 2014	Lions	60–25	Cheetahs	Ellis Park Stadium, Johannesburg
17:05	Try: Lionel Mapoe 23', 34', 73'; Ross Cronjé 32'; Robbie Coetzee 52'; Warren Whiteley 55'; Andries Coetzee 61'; Corné Fourie 76'; Con: Elton Jantjies 24', 33', 35', 53', 56', 62', 75' (7/8); Pen: Elton Jantjies 9', 20' (2/2); Ross Cronjé (0/1); Cards: Elton Jantjies (yellow card) 41' to 51'	Report; Scoreboard	Try: Willie le Roux 17'; Cornal Hendricks 44', 69'; Con: Johan Goosen 18', 45' (2/2); Elgar Watts (0/1); Pen: Johan Goosen 6', 26' (2/2); Cards: Philip van der Walt (yellow card) 23' to 33'; Coenie Oosthuizen (yellow card) 52' to 62'; Johan Goosen (yellow card) 56' to 64'	Referee: Marius van der Westhuizen

12 July 2014	Stormers	10–34	Sharks	DHL Newlands, Cape Town
19:10	Try: Nizaam Carr 16'; Con: Kurt Coleman 17' (1/1); Pen: Kurt Coleman 36' (1/2)	Report; Scoreboard	Try: Paul Jordaan 38'; S'bura Sithole 76'; Stefan Ungerer 81'; Con: François Steyn 39', 77' (2/2); Fred Zeilinga (0/1); Pen: François Steyn 4', 22', 25', 28', 45' (5/6); Cards: Willem Alberts (yellow card) 15' to 26'	Referee: Jaco Peyper

Bye/s: Hurricanes

== Finals ==
First round
19 July 2014
4	(Australia) Brumbies	32
5	(New Zealand) Chiefs	30
19 July 2014
3	(South Africa) Sharks	31
6	(New Zealand) Highlanders	27

Semifinals
26 July 2014
1	(Australia) Waratahs	26
4	(Australia) Brumbies	8
26 July 2014
2	(New Zealand) Crusaders	38
3	(South Africa) Sharks	6

Final
2 August 2014
(Australia) Waratahs	33
(New Zealand) Crusaders	32

=== Qualifiers ===
19 July 2014	Brumbies	32–30	Chiefs	GIO Stadium, Canberra
19:40	Try: Nic White 6'; Robbie Coleman 10'; Jesse Mogg 21'; Jarrad Butler 61'; Con: Christian Lealiifano 7', 11', 62' (3/4); Pen: Christian Lealiifano 29', 45' (2/4); Cards: Henry Speight (yellow card) 8' to 58'	Report; Scoreboard	Try: Bundee Aki 35'; Tawera Kerr-Barlow 50'; Tim Nanai-Williams 55'; Gareth Anscombe 77'; Con: Aaron Cruden 36', 51' (2/4); Pen: Aaron Cruden 3', 42' (2/2); Cards: Tim Nanai-Williams (yellow card) 5' to 16'	Attendance: 14,284; Referee: Craig Joubert

19 July 2014	Sharks	31–27	Highlanders	Growthpoint Kings Park, Durban
17:05	Try: Marcell Coetzee 13'; Bismarck du Plessis 53'; Tonderai Chavhanga 56'; Con: François Steyn 14', 54' (2/3); Pen: François Steyn 3', 30', 74', 80' (4/5)	Report; Scoreboard	Try: Malakai Fekitoa 32'; Kane Hames 40'; Phil Burleigh 63'; Con: Lima Sopoaga 33', 40', 64' (3/3); Pen: Lima Sopoaga 26', 48' (2/2)	Referee: Steve Walsh

=== Semi-finals ===
26 July 2014	Crusaders	38-6	Sharks	AMI Stadium, Christchurch
17:05	Try:	Report; Scoreboard	Try:

26 July 2014	Waratahs	26–8	Brumbies	Allianz Stadium, Sydney
19:40	Try: Alofa Alofa 3'; Kurtley Beale 47'; Bernard Foley 76'; Con: Bernard Foley 77'(1/3); Pen: Bernard Foley 22', 40', 73' (3/3); Cards: Taqele Naiyaravoro (yellow card) 80'	Report; Scoreboard	Try: Henry Speight 31'; Con: Christian Lealiifano (0/1); Pen: Christian Lealiifano 39'(1/2)	Attendance: 38,800; Referee: Jaco Peyper

=== Final ===
2 August 2014	Waratahs	33–32	Crusaders	ANZ Stadium, Sydney
19:40	Try: Adam Ashley-Cooper 5'; Con: Bernard Foley 64'(1/2); Pen: Bernard Foley 3', 11', 15', 22', 38', 54', 80' (7/8)	Report; Scoreboard	Try: Matt Todd 18'; Nemani Nadolo 43'; Con: Dan Carter 19'(1/1); Colin Slade 43'(1/1); Pen: Colin Slade 26', 36', 49', 57', 68', 76' (6/6)	Attendance: 61,823; Referee: Craig Joubert

== Players ==
=== Player statistics ===
The following table contain points which have been scored in competitive games in the 2014 Super Rugby season.

All point scorers
No	Player	Team	T	C	P	DG	Pts
1	Bernard Foley	Waratahs	6	45	44	0	252
2	Beauden Barrett	Hurricanes	5	32	40	0	209
3	Colin Slade	Crusaders	4	20	46	0	198
4	Marnitz Boshoff	Lions	0	18	43	8	189
5	Lima Sopoaga	Highlanders	2	27	38	0	178
6	François Steyn	Sharks	0	16	43	1	164
7	Jacques-Louis Potgieter	Bulls	1	14	34	3	144
7	Jason Woodward	Rebels	3	15	33	0	144
9	Johan Goosen	Cheetahs	1	21	30	2	143
10	Simon Hickey	Blues	0	20	28	0	124
11	Quade Cooper	Reds	2	22	21	1	120
12	Sias Ebersohn	Force	1	17	25	1	117
13	Nic White	Brumbies	2	17	22	0	110
14	Aaron Cruden	Chiefs	1	21	19	0	104
15	Gareth Anscombe	Chiefs	3	9	17	0	84
16	Handré Pollard	Bulls	1	10	16	1	76
17	Christian Lealiifano	Brumbies	0	12	15	0	69
18	Mike Harris	Reds	3	11	10	0	67
19	Israel Folau	Waratahs	12	0	0	0	60
19	Nemani Nadolo	Crusaders	12	0	0	0	60
21	Tom Taylor	Crusaders	1	6	14	0	59
22	Kurtley Beale	Waratahs	8	0	6	0	58
22	Patrick Lambie	Sharks	1	4	15	0	58
24	Jayden Hayward	Force	4	9	5	0	53
25	Ihaia West	Blues	2	12	6	0	52
26	Kurt Coleman	Stormers	1	8	10	0	51
26	Hayden Parker	Highlanders	1	5	10	2	51
28	Jesse Mogg	Brumbies	8	0	3	0	49
28	Elgar Watts	Cheetahs	1	10	8	0	49
30	Peter Grant	Stormers	0	10	9	0	47
31	Demetri Catrakilis	Stormers	0	4	12	0	44
32	Robbie Coleman	Brumbies	8	0	0	0	40
32	George Moala	Blues	8	0	0	0	40
34	Matt To'omua	Brumbies	7	2	0	0	39
35	Tim Swiel	Sharks	0	4	10	0	38
36	Nick Cummins	Force	7	0	0	0	35
36	Malakai Fekitoa	Highlanders	7	0	0	0	35
36	Johnny McNicholl	Crusaders	7	0	0	0	35
36	Tim Nanai-Williams	Chiefs	7	0	0	0	35
36	Julian Savea	Hurricanes	7	0	0	0	35
41	Dan Carter	Crusaders	0	5	8	0	34
42	Cornal Hendricks	Cheetahs	6	0	0	0	30
42	Matt Hodgson	Force	6	0	0	0	30
42	Lionel Mapoe	Lions	6	0	0	0	30
42	Cobus Reinach	Sharks	6	0	0	0	30
46	Bryce Hegarty	Rebels	3	4	2	0	29
47	Elton Jantjies	Lions	1	7	3	0	28
48	Alofa Alofa	Waratahs	5	0	0	0	25
48	Richard Buckman	Highlanders	5	0	0	0	25
48	Rob Horne	Waratahs	5	0	0	0	25
48	Tevita Kuridrani	Brumbies	5	0	0	0	25
48	Willie le Roux	Cheetahs	5	0	0	0	25
48	Patrick Osborne	Highlanders	5	0	0	0	25
48	TJ Perenara	Hurricanes	5	0	0	0	25
48	Ben Smith	Highlanders	5	0	0	0	25
48	Lolagi Visinia	Blues	5	0	0	0	25
48	Fred Zeilinga	Sharks	0	2	7	0	25
58	Bundee Aki	Chiefs	4	0	0	0	20
58	Adam Ashley-Cooper	Waratahs	4	0	0	0	20
58	Luke Burgess	Rebels	4	0	0	0	20
58	Nizaam Carr	Stormers	4	0	0	0	20
58	Rod Davies	Reds	4	0	0	0	20
58	Damian de Allende	Stormers	4	0	0	0	20
58	Scott Higginbotham	Rebels	4	0	0	0	20
58	Cory Jane	Hurricanes	4	0	0	0	20
58	Pat McCabe	Brumbies	4	0	0	0	20
58	Ben McCalman	Force	4	0	0	0	20
58	Boom Prinsloo	Cheetahs	4	0	0	0	20
58	Jono Ross	Bulls	4	0	0	0	20
58	Courtnall Skosan	Lions	4	0	0	0	20
58	Aaron Smith	Highlanders	4	0	0	0	20
58	Matt Todd	Crusaders	4	0	0	0	20
58	Lachlan Turner	Reds	4	0	0	0	20
74	Zack Holmes	Force	1	2	3	0	18
74	Chris Noakes	Blues	0	6	2	0	18
76	Willem Alberts	Sharks	3	0	0	0	15
76	Bjorn Basson	Bulls	3	0	0	0	15
76	Rayno Benjamin	Cheetahs	3	0	0	0	15
76	Phil Burleigh	Highlanders	3	0	0	0	15
76	Nathan Charles	Force	3	0	0	0	15
76	Marcell Coetzee	Sharks	3	0	0	0	15
76	Juan de Jongh	Stormers	3	0	0	0	15
76	Faf de Klerk	Lions	3	0	0	0	15
76	Bismarck du Plessis	Sharks	3	0	0	0	15
76	Chris Feauai-Sautia	Reds	3	0	0	0	15
76	Frank Halai	Blues	3	0	0	0	15
76	Paul Jordaan	Sharks	3	0	0	0	15
76	Alapati Leiua	Hurricanes	3	0	0	0	15
76	Faifili Levave	Hurricanes	3	0	0	0	15
76	Tevita Li	Blues	3	0	0	0	15
76	Tom Marshall	Chiefs	3	0	0	0	15
76	Liam Messam	Chiefs	3	0	0	0	15
76	Nick Phipps	Waratahs	3	0	0	0	15
76	Sarel Pretorius	Cheetahs	3	0	0	0	15
76	Jan Serfontein	Bulls	3	0	0	0	15
76	Conrad Smith	Hurricanes	3	0	0	0	15
76	Henry Speight	Brumbies	3	0	0	0	15
76	Andre Taylor	Hurricanes	2	1	1	0	15
76	Blade Thomson	Hurricanes	3	0	0	0	15
76	Joe Tomane	Brumbies	3	0	0	0	15
76	Paul Willemse	Bulls	3	0	0	0	15
102	Jack Debreczeni	Rebels	1	3	1	0	14
103	Louis Fouché	Bulls	0	0	3	1	12
104	Angus Roberts	Rebels	1	0	1	1	11
105	Pita Ahki	Blues	2	0	0	0	10
105	Peter Betham	Waratahs	2	0	0	0	10
105	Luke Braid	Blues	2	0	0	0	10
105	Curtis Browning	Reds	2	0	0	0	10
105	Sam Carter	Brumbies	2	0	0	0	10
105	Shane Christie	Highlanders	2	0	0	0	10
105	Ryan Crotty	Crusaders	2	0	0	0	10
105	Hennie Daniller	Cheetahs	2	0	0	0	10
105	Dave Dennis	Waratahs	2	0	0	0	10
105	Jacques du Plessis	Bulls	2	0	0	0	10
105	Gareth Evans	Highlanders	2	0	0	0	10
105	Scott Fardy	Brumbies	2	0	0	0	10
105	Corey Flynn	Crusaders	2	0	0	0	10
105	Kieron Fonotia	Crusaders	2	0	0	0	10
105	Deon Fourie	Stormers	2	0	0	0	10
105	Ben Franks	Hurricanes	2	0	0	0	10
105	Nick Frisby	Reds	2	0	0	0	10
105	Scott Fuglistaller	Rebels	2	0	0	0	10
105	Bryn Hall	Blues	2	0	0	0	10
105	James Hanson	Reds	2	0	0	0	10
105	Josh Hohneck	Chiefs	2	0	0	0	10
105	Michael Hooper	Waratahs	2	0	0	0	10
105	Mitch Inman	Rebels	2	0	0	0	10
105	Tawera Kerr-Barlow	Chiefs	2	0	0	0	10
105	Tanerau Latimer	Chiefs	2	0	0	0	10
105	James Lowe	Chiefs	2	0	0	0	10
105	Ben Lucas	Reds	2	0	0	0	10
105	Frans Malherbe	Stormers	2	0	0	0	10
105	Benji Marshall	Blues	1	1	1	0	10
105	Stephen Moore	Brumbies	2	0	0	0	10
105	Luke Morahan	Force	2	0	0	0	10
105	Lwazi Mvovo	Sharks	2	0	0	0	10
105	Odwa Ndungane	Sharks	2	0	0	0	10
105	Charlie Ngatai	Chiefs	2	0	0	0	10
105	Ma'a Nonu	Blues	2	0	0	0	10
105	Charles Piutau	Blues	2	0	0	0	10
105	Jacques Potgieter	Waratahs	2	0	0	0	10
105	Augustine Pulu	Chiefs	2	0	0	0	10
105	Raymond Rhule	Cheetahs	2	0	0	0	10
105	Ardie Savea	Hurricanes	2	0	0	0	10
105	Francis Saili	Blues	2	0	0	0	10
105	Dom Shipperley	Reds	2	0	0	0	10
105	Rob Simmons	Reds	2	0	0	0	10
105	S'bura Sithole	Sharks	2	0	0	0	10
105	Ben Tameifuna	Chiefs	2	0	0	0	10
105	Warwick Tecklenburg	Lions	2	0	0	0	10
105	Asaeli Tikoirotuma	Chiefs	2	0	0	0	10
105	Chris Tuatara-Morrison	Force	2	0	0	0	10
105	Patrick Tuipulotu	Blues	2	0	0	0	10
105	Marcel van der Merwe	Bulls	2	0	0	0	10
105	Philip van der Walt	Cheetahs	2	0	0	0	10
105	Kobus van Wyk	Stormers	2	0	0	0	10
105	Telusa Veainu	Rebels	2	0	0	0	10
105	Stefan Watermeyer	Lions	2	0	0	0	10
105	Warren Whiteley	Lions	2	0	0	0	10
105	Luke Whitelock	Crusaders	2	0	0	0	10
105	Jackson Willison	Blues	2	0	0	0	10
162	Trent Renata	Highlanders	1	2	0	0	9
163	Israel Dagg	Crusaders	1	0	1	0	8
163	Jaco Taute	Stormers	1	0	0	1	8
163	Jurgen Visser	Bulls	1	0	1	0	8
166	Will Genia	Reds	1	1	0	0	7
166	Willi Heinz	Crusaders	1	1	0	0	7
168	Andrew Horrell	Chiefs	0	3	0	0	6
169	Albert Anae	Reds	1	0	0	0	5
169	Gio Aplon	Stormers	1	0	0	0	5
169	Marty Banks	Hurricanes	0	1	1	0	5
169	Ryno Barnes	Cheetahs	1	0	0	0	5
169	Ruan Botha	Stormers	1	0	0	0	5
169	Jarrad Butler	Brumbies	1	0	0	0	5
169	Matthew Carraro	Waratahs	1	0	0	0	5
169	Dale Chadwick	Sharks	1	0	0	0	5
169	Tonderai Chavhanga	Sharks	1	0	0	0	5
169	Andries Coetzee	Lions	1	0	0	0	5
169	Robbie Coetzee	Lions	1	0	0	0	5
169	Dane Coles	Hurricanes	1	0	0	0	5
169	Jean Cook	Cheetahs	1	0	0	0	5
169	Kyle Cooper	Sharks	1	0	0	0	5
169	Angus Cottrell	Force	1	0	0	0	5
169	Pekahou Cowan	Force	1	0	0	0	5
169	Wyatt Crockett	Crusaders	1	0	0	0	5
169	Ross Cronjé	Lions	1	0	0	0	5
169	Ben Daley	Reds	1	0	0	0	5
169	Keegan Daniel	Sharks	1	0	0	0	5
169	Lood de Jager	Cheetahs	1	0	0	0	5
169	Jean de Villiers	Stormers	1	0	0	0	5
169	Jean Deysel	Sharks	1	0	0	0	5
169	Tom Donnelly	Blues	1	0	0	0	5
169	Kane Douglas	Waratahs	1	0	0	0	5
169	Andy Ellis	Crusaders	1	0	0	0	5
169	Tamati Ellison	Rebels	1	0	0	0	5
169	JJ Engelbrecht	Bulls	1	0	0	0	5
169	Tom English	Rebels	1	0	0	0	5
169	Colby Fainga'a	Rebels	1	0	0	0	5
169	Charlie Faumuina	Blues	1	0	0	0	5
169	Michael Fitzgerald	Chiefs	1	0	0	0	5
169	Corné Fourie	Lions	1	0	0	0	5
169	Ben Funnell	Crusaders	1	0	0	0	5
169	Robbie Fruean	Chiefs	1	0	0	0	5
169	Kyle Godwin	Force	1	0	0	0	5
169	Dean Greyling	Bulls	1	0	0	0	5
169	Kane Hames	Highlanders	1	0	0	0	5
169	John Hardie	Highlanders	1	0	0	0	5
169	Dane Haylett-Petty	Force	1	0	0	0	5
169	Stephen Hoiles	Waratahs	1	0	0	0	5
169	Alwyn Hollenbach	Lions	1	0	0	0	5
169	Greg Holmes	Reds	1	0	0	0	5
169	Shota Horie	Rebels	1	0	0	0	5
169	James Horwill	Reds	1	0	0	0	5
169	Francois Hougaard	Bulls	1	0	0	0	5
169	Jerome Kaino	Blues	1	0	0	0	5
169	Oli Kebble	Stormers	1	0	0	0	5
169	Sekope Kepu	Waratahs	1	0	0	0	5
169	Samu Kerevi	Reds	1	0	0	0	5
169	Tom Kingston	Rebels	1	0	0	0	5
169	Siya Kolisi	Stormers	1	0	0	0	5
169	Tevita Koloamatangi	Chiefs	1	0	0	0	5
169	Jaco Kriel	Lions	1	0	0	0	5
169	Jack Lam	Hurricanes	1	0	0	0	5
169	Jono Lance	Waratahs	1	0	0	0	5
169	Nepo Laulala	Crusaders	1	0	0	0	5
169	Patrick Leafa	Rebels	1	0	0	0	5
169	Steven Luatua	Blues	1	0	0	0	5
169	Jamie Mackintosh	Chiefs	1	0	0	0	5
169	Pauliasi Manu	Chiefs	1	0	0	0	5
169	James Marshall	Hurricanes	1	0	0	0	5
169	Alby Mathewson	Force	1	0	0	0	5
169	Motu Matu'u	Hurricanes	1	0	0	0	5
169	Lachlan McCaffrey	Brumbies	1	0	0	0	5
169	Brendan McKibbin	Waratahs	1	0	0	0	5
169	Tom McVerry	Brumbies	1	0	0	0	5
169	Lachlan Mitchell	Rebels	1	0	0	0	5
169	Oupa Mohojé	Cheetahs	1	0	0	0	5
169	Ben Mowen	Brumbies	1	0	0	0	5
169	Mils Muliaina	Chiefs	1	0	0	0	5
169	Taqele Naiyaravoro	Waratahs	1	0	0	0	5
169	Akona Ndungane	Bulls	1	0	0	0	5
169	Sikhumbuzo Notshe	Stormers	1	0	0	0	5
169	Scarra Ntubeni	Stormers	1	0	0	0	5
169	Trevor Nyakane	Cheetahs	1	0	0	0	5
169	Wycliff Palu	Waratahs	1	0	0	0	5
169	Hadleigh Parkes	Hurricanes	1	0	0	0	5
169	Tim Perry	Crusaders	1	0	0	0	5
169	JP Pietersen	Sharks	1	0	0	0	5
169	Leon Power	Brumbies	1	0	0	0	5
169	Matt Proctor	Hurricanes	1	0	0	0	5
169	Eddie Quirk	Reds	1	0	0	0	5
169	Junior Rasolea	Force	1	0	0	0	5
169	Kieran Read	Crusaders	1	0	0	0	5
169	Brodie Retallick	Chiefs	1	0	0	0	5
169	Beau Robinson	Reds	1	0	0	0	5
169	Benn Robinson	Waratahs	1	0	0	0	5
169	Ged Robinson	Highlanders	1	0	0	0	5
169	Johann Sadie	Cheetahs	1	0	0	0	5
169	Jake Schatz	Reds	1	0	0	0	5
169	Brad Shields	Hurricanes	1	0	0	0	5
169	Scott Sio	Brumbies	1	0	0	0	5
169	James Slipper	Reds	1	0	0	0	5
169	William Small-Smith	Bulls	1	0	0	0	5
169	Chris Smylie	Hurricanes	1	0	0	0	5
169	Liam Squire	Chiefs	1	0	0	0	5
169	Brynard Stander	Force	1	0	0	0	5
169	Deon Stegmann	Bulls	1	0	0	0	5
169	Dwayne Sweeney	Chiefs	1	0	0	0	5
169	Matt Symons	Chiefs	1	0	0	0	5
169	Angus Ta'avao	Blues	1	0	0	0	5
169	Sailosi Tagicakibau	Stormers	1	0	0	0	5
169	Fumiaki Tanaka	Highlanders	1	0	0	0	5
169	Ben Tapuai	Reds	1	0	0	0	5
169	Jordan Taufua	Crusaders	1	0	0	0	5
169	Jamie-Jerry Taulagi	Reds	1	0	0	0	5
169	Jeremy Thrush	Hurricanes	1	0	0	0	5
169	Jeffery Toomaga-Allen	Hurricanes	1	0	0	0	5
169	Aidan Toua	Reds	1	0	0	0	5
169	Shaun Treeby	Highlanders	1	0	0	0	5
169	Stefan Ungerer	Sharks	1	0	0	0	5
169	Francois Uys	Cheetahs	1	0	0	0	5
169	Akker van der Merwe	Lions	1	0	0	0	5
169	Torsten van Jaarsveld	Cheetahs	1	0	0	0	5
169	Deon van Rensburg	Lions	1	0	0	0	5
169	Coenie van Wyk	Lions	1	0	0	0	5
169	Francois Venter	Cheetahs	1	0	0	0	5
169	Duane Vermeulen	Stormers	1	0	0	0	5
169	Callie Visagie	Bulls	1	0	0	0	5
169	Anthony Volmink	Lions	1	0	0	0	5
169	Brad Weber	Chiefs	1	0	0	0	5
169	Willie Wepener	Lions	1	0	0	0	5
169	Sam Whitelock	Crusaders	1	0	0	0	5
169	Devon Williams	Stormers	1	0	0	0	5
169	Tony Woodcock	Blues	1	0	0	0	5
295	Tyler Bleyendaal	Crusaders	0	2	0	0	4
296	SP Marais	Sharks	0	0	1	0	3
* Legend: T = Tries, C = Conversions, P = Penalties, DG = Drop Goals, Pts = Points. Correct as at 26 July 2014.

=== Squad lists ===
The teams released the following squad lists:

2014 Super Rugby squads

==== Blues ====
  - Luke Braid
  - Tom Donnelly
  - Charlie Faumuina
  - Jerome Kaino
  - Steve Luatua
  - Jordan Manihera
  - Tom McCartney
  - Keven Mealamu
  - Liaki Moli
  - Brendon O'Connor
  - James Parsons
  - Sam Prattley
  - Peter Saili
  - Angus Ta'avao
  - Hayden Triggs
  - Ofa Tu'ungafasi
  - Patrick Tuipulotu
  - Tony Woodcock
  - Did not play: Kane Barrett
  Backs:
  - Pita Ahki
  - Jamison Gibson-Park
  - Frank Halai
  - Bryn Hall
  - Simon Hickey
  - Tevita Li
  - Benji Marshall
  - George Moala
  - Albert Nikoro
  - Chris Noakes
  - Ma'a Nonu
  - Charles Piutau
  - Francis Saili
  - Lolagi Visinia
  - Piri Weepu
  - Ihaia West
  - Jackson Willison
  - Did not play: Baden Kerr
  - Sonatane Takulua
  - Coach: Sir John Kirwan

==== Brumbies ====
  - Allan Alaalatoa
  - Ben Alexander
  - Fotu Auelua
  - Jarrad Butler
  - Sam Carter
  - Scott Fardy
  - Luke Holmes
  - Joshua Mann-Rea
  - Lachlan McCaffrey
  - Tom McVerry
  - Stephen Moore
  - Ben Mowen
  - Ruaidhri Murphy
  - David Pocock
  - Leon Power
  - Siliva Siliva
  - Scott Sio
  - Jordan Smiler
  - JP Smith
  - Ruan Smith
  - Tom Staniforth
  - Jack Whetton
  Backs:
  - Robbie Coleman
  - Lionel Cronjé
  - Michael Dowsett
  - Conrad Hoffmann
  - Rodney Iona
  - Tevita Kuridrani
  - Christian Lealiifano
  - Pat McCabe
  - Jesse Mogg
  - Clyde Rathbone
  - Andrew Smith
  - Henry Speight
  - Joe Tomane
  - Matt To'omua
  - Nic White
  - Did not play: Stephan van der Walt
  - Coach: Stephen Larkham
  ==== Bulls ====
  - Jacques du Plessis
  - Jacques Engelbrecht
  - Dean Greyling
  - Grant Hattingh
  - Nico Janse van Rensburg
  - Frik Kirsten
  - Werner Kruger
  - Wiaan Liebenberg
  - Bandise Maku
  - Victor Matfield
  - Bongi Mbonambi
  - Morné Mellett
  - Marvin Orie
  - Dewald Potgieter
  - Jono Ross
  - Roelof Smit
  - Pierre Spies
  - Deon Stegmann
  - Flip van der Merwe
  - Marcel van der Merwe
  - Wimpie van der Walt
  - Callie Visagie
  - Paul Willemse
  - Did not play:
  - Arno Botha
  - David Bulbring
  Backs:
  - Bjorn Basson
  - Ulrich Beyers
  - JJ Engelbrecht
  - Louis Fouché
  - Francois Hougaard
  - Jesse Kriel
  - Sampie Mastriet
  - Akona Ndungane
  - Rudy Paige
  - Handré Pollard
  - Jacques-Louis Potgieter
  - Jan Serfontein
  - William Small-Smith
  - Piet van Zyl
  - Jurgen Visser
  - Did not play:
  - Clayton Blommetjies
  - Travis Ismaiel
  - Waylon Murray
  - Coach: Frans Ludeke

==== Cheetahs ====
  - Ryno Barnes
  - Heinrich Brüssow
  - Jean Cook
  - Luan de Bruin
  - Lood de Jager
  - Rossouw de Klerk
  - Andries Ferreira
  - Carel Greeff
  - Lappies Labuschagné
  - Ligtoring Landman
  - Hilton Lobberts
  - Oupa Mohojé
  - Trevor Nyakane
  - Caylib Oosthuizen
  - Coenie Oosthuizen
  - Boom Prinsloo
  - Boela Serfontein
  - Kevin Stevens
  - Adriaan Strauss
  - Francois Uys
  - Philip van der Walt
  - Maks van Dyk
  - Torsten van Jaarsveld
  - Henco Venter
  - Waltie Vermeulen
  - Carl Wegner
  - Did not play:
  - Martin Bezuidenhout
  - Hercú Liebenberg
  - Nick Schonert
  Backs:
  - Rayno Benjamin
  - Hennie Daniller
  - Johan Goosen
  - Cornal Hendricks
  - Willie le Roux
  - Tian Meyer
  - Howard Mnisi
  - Sarel Pretorius
  - Raymond Rhule
  - Johann Sadie
  - Riaan Smit
  - Francois Venter
  - Shaun Venter
  - Elgar Watts
  - Did not play:
  - Renier Botha
  - Francois Brummer
  - Rocco Jansen
  - Piet Lindeque
  - Kevin Luiters
  - Gouws Prinsloo
  - Coach: Naka Drotské

==== Chiefs ====
  - Ben Afeaki
  - Nick Barrett
  - Sam Cane
  - Nick Crosswell
  - Ross Filipo
  - Michael Fitzgerald
  - Nathan Harris
  - Josh Hohneck
  - Tevita Koloamatangi
  - Tanerau Latimer
  - Jamie Mackintosh
  - Pauliasi Manu
  - Rhys Marshall
  - Liam Messam
  - Brodie Retallick
  - Mahonri Schwalger
  - Liam Squire
  - Matt Symons
  - Ben Tameifuna
  - Kane Thompson
  - Did not play:
  - Hika Elliot
  Backs:
  - Bundee Aki
  - Gareth Anscombe
  - Aaron Cruden
  - Robbie Fruean
  - Andrew Horrell
  - Tawera Kerr-Barlow
  - Anton Lienert-Brown
  - James Lowe
  - Tom Marshall
  - Mils Muliaina
  - Tim Nanai-Williams
  - Charlie Ngatai
  - Jordan Payne
  - Augustine Pulu
  - Dwayne Sweeney
  - Asaeli Tikoirotuma
  - Brad Weber
  - Did not play:
  - Robbie Robinson
  - Coach: Dave Rennie

==== Crusaders ====
  - Scott Barrett
  - Dominic Bird
  - Wyatt Crockett
  - Corey Flynn
  - Owen Franks
  - Ben Funnell
  - Nepo Laulala
  - Daniel Lienert-Brown
  - Richie McCaw
  - Joe Moody
  - Tim Perry
  - Kieran Read
  - Luke Romano
  - Jordan Taufua
  - Codie Taylor
  - Matt Todd
  - Jimmy Tupou
  - George Whitelock
  - Luke Whitelock
  - Sam Whitelock
  Backs:
  - Tyler Bleyendaal
  - Dan Carter
  - Ryan Crotty
  - Israel Dagg
  - Mitchell Drummond
  - Andy Ellis
  - Kieron Fonotia
  - Willi Heinz
  - Rey Lee-Lo
  - Johnny McNicholl
  - Nemani Nadolo
  - Colin Slade
  - Tom Taylor
  - Rob Thompson
  - Nafi Tuitavake
  - Adam Whitelock
  - Did not play:
  - Zac Guildford
  - Coach: Todd Blackadder

==== Western Force ====
  - Chris Alcock
  - Phoenix Battye
  - Nathan Charles
  - Adam Coleman
  - Angus Cottrell
  - Pekahou Cowan
  - Tetera Faulkner
  - Matt Hodgson
  - Ryan Hodson
  - Ollie Hoskins
  - Kieran Longbottom
  - Ben McCalman
  - Hugh McMeniman
  - Brynard Stander
  - Wilhelm Steenkamp
  - Heath Tessmann
  - Francois van Wyk
  - Sam Wykes
  - Did not play:
  - Chris Heiberg
  - Salesi Manu
  Backs:
  - Marcel Brache
  - Luke Burton
  - Nick Cummins
  - Patrick Dellit
  - Sias Ebersohn
  - Kyle Godwin
  - Dane Haylett-Petty
  - Jayden Hayward
  - Zack Holmes
  - Dillyn Leyds
  - Alby Mathewson
  - Luke Morahan
  - Ian Prior
  - Junior Rasolea
  - Chris Tuatara-Morrison
  - Justin Turner
  - Did not play:
  - Ed Stubbs
  - Coach: Michael Foley

==== Highlanders ====
  - Lee Allan
  - Sam Anderson-Heather
  - Josh Bekhuis
  - Shane Christie
  - Liam Coltman
  - Matías Díaz
  - Elliot Dixon
  - Gareth Evans
  - Ma'afu Fia
  - Tom Franklin
  - Kane Hames
  - John Hardie
  - Jarrad Hoeata
  - TJ Ioane
  - Chris King
  - JP Koen
  - Nasi Manu
  - Craig Millar
  - Brayden Mitchell
  - Ged Robinson
  - Brad Thorn
  - Joe Wheeler
  - Did not play:
  - Aki Seiuli
  Backs:
  - Kurt Baker
  - Richard Buckman
  - Phil Burleigh
  - Jason Emery
  - Malakai Fekitoa
  - Patrick Osborne
  - Hayden Parker
  - Trent Renata
  - Aaron Smith
  - Ben Smith
  - Lima Sopoaga
  - Winston Stanley
  - Fumiaki Tanaka
  - Shaun Treeby
  - Did not play:
  - Willie Ripia
  - Frae Wilson
  - Coach: Jamie Joseph

==== Hurricanes ====
  - Mark Abbott
  - James Broadhurst
  - Dane Coles
  - Ash Dixon
  - Brendon Edmonds
  - Chris Eves
  - Ben Franks
  - Reggie Goodes
  - Adam Hill
  - Jack Lam
  - Faifili Levave
  - Motu Matu'u
  - Mark Reddish
  - Ardie Savea
  - John Schwalger
  - Brad Shields
  - Blade Thomson
  - Jeremy Thrush
  - Jeffery Toomaga-Allen
  - Victor Vito
  - Did not play:
  - Eric Sione
  Backs:
  - Marty Banks
  - Beauden Barrett
  - Tim Bateman
  - Billy Guyton
  - Cory Jane
  - Alapati Leiua
  - James Marshall
  - Hadleigh Parkes
  - TJ Perenara
  - Matt Proctor
  - Julian Savea
  - Conrad Smith
  - Chris Smylie
  - Andre Taylor
  - Cardiff Vaega
  - Coach: Mark Hammett

==== Lions ====
  - Willie Britz
  - Robbie Coetzee
  - Stephan de Wit
  - Ruan Dreyer
  - Corné Fourie
  - Jaco Kriel
  - MB Lusaseni
  - Charles Marais
  - Malcolm Marx
  - Rudi Mathee
  - Derick Minnie
  - Franco Mostert
  - Martin Muller
  - Mark Pretorius
  - Julian Redelinghuys
  - Warwick Tecklenburg
  - Akker van der Merwe
  - Franco van der Merwe
  - Schalk van der Merwe
  - Jacques van Rooyen
  - Willie Wepener
  - Warren Whiteley
  Backs:
  - Marnitz Boshoff
  - Chrysander Botha
  - Andries Coetzee
  - Ruan Combrinck
  - Ross Cronjé
  - Faf de Klerk
  - Stokkies Hanekom
  - Alwyn Hollenbach
  - Elton Jantjies
  - JW Jonker
  - Lionel Mapoe
  - Courtnall Skosan
  - Deon van Rensburg
  - Coenie van Wyk
  - Anthony Volmink
  - Stefan Watermeyer
  - Did not play:
  - Michael Bondesio
  - Deon Helberg
  - Coach: Johan Ackermann

==== Rebels ====
  - Cruze Ah-Nau
  - Paul Alo-Emile
  - Colby Fainga'a
  - Steve Fualau
  - Scott Fuglistaller
  - Scott Higginbotham
  - Shota Horie
  - Sam Jeffries
  - Luke Jones
  - Max Lahiff
  - Patrick Leafa
  - Sean McMahon
  - Cadeyrn Neville
  - Hugh Pyle
  - Jordy Reid
  - Toby Smith
  - Lopeti Timani
  - Laurie Weeks
  - Did not play:
  - Eddie Aholelei
  - Tom Sexton
  - Chris Thomson
  Backs:
  - Luke Burgess
  - Jack Debreczeni
  - Tamati Ellison
  - Tom English
  - Lalakai Foketi
  - Bryce Hegarty
  - Josh Holmes
  - Mitch Inman
  - Tom Kingston
  - Ben Meehan
  - Lachlan Mitchell
  - Angus Roberts
  - Alex Rokobaro
  - Male Sa'u
  - Nic Stirzaker
  - Telusa Veainu
  - Jason Woodward
  - Coach: Tony McGahan

==== Reds ====
  - Albert Anae
  - Curtis Browning
  - Tim Buchanan
  - Ben Daley
  - Saia Fainga'a
  - Liam Gill
  - James Hanson
  - Greg Holmes
  - James Horwill
  - David McDuling
  - Ed O'Donoghue
  - Jono Owen
  - Eddie Quirk
  - Beau Robinson
  - Jake Schatz
  - Rob Simmons
  - James Slipper
  - Did not play:
  - Sef Fa'agase
  - Pettowa Paraka
  - Andrew Ready
  Backs:
  - Quade Cooper
  - Rod Davies
  - Anthony Fainga'a
  - Chris Feauai-Sautia
  - Nick Frisby
  - Scott Gale
  - Will Genia
  - Mike Harris
  - Sam Johnson
  - Samu Kerevi
  - Chris Kuridrani
  - Ben Lucas
  - Jonah Placid
  - Dom Shipperley
  - Ben Tapuai
  - JJ Taulagi
  - Aidan Toua
  - Lachlan Turner
  - Coach: Richard Graham

==== Sharks ====
  - Lourens Adriaanse
  - Willem Alberts
  - Jacques Botes
  - Anton Bresler
  - Dale Chadwick
  - Marcell Coetzee
  - Kyle Cooper
  - Keegan Daniel
  - Jean Deysel
  - Bismarck du Plessis
  - Jannie du Plessis
  - Pieter-Steph du Toit
  - Thomas du Toit
  - Wiehahn Herbst
  - Ryan Kankowski
  - Stephan Lewies
  - Franco Marais
  - Tendai Mtawarira
  - Tera Mtembu
  - Etienne Oosthuizen
  - Did not play:
  - Monde Hadebe
  - Peet Marais
  Backs:
  - Tonderai Chavhanga
  - André Esterhuizen
  - Paul Jordaan
  - Patrick Lambie
  - SP Marais
  - Charl McLeod
  - Lwazi Mvovo
  - Odwa Ndungane
  - JP Pietersen
  - Cobus Reinach
  - S'bura Sithole
  - François Steyn
  - Tim Swiel
  - Stefan Ungerer
  - Jaco van Tonder
  - Heimar Williams
  - Fred Zeilinga
  - Did not play:
  - Tyler Fisher
  - Hansie Graaff
  - Coach: Jake White

==== Stormers ====
  - Ruan Botha
  - Schalk Burger
  - Manuel Carizza
  - Nizaam Carr
  - Pat Cilliers
  - Stephan Coetzee
  - Martin Dreyer
  - Rynhardt Elstadt
  - Deon Fourie
  - Brok Harris
  - Oli Kebble
  - Rohan Kitshoff
  - Steven Kitshoff
  - Jean Kleyn
  - Siya Kolisi
  - Tiaan Liebenberg
  - Frans Malherbe
  - Sikhumbuzo Notshe
  - Scarra Ntubeni
  - Michael Rhodes
  - Sti Sithole
  - De Kock Steenkamp
  - Jurie van Vuuren
  - Alistair Vermaak
  - Duane Vermeulen
  - Mike Willemse
  - Did not play:
  - Eben Etzebeth
  - Tazz Fuzani
  Backs:
  - Gio Aplon
  - Demetri Catrakilis
  - Kurt Coleman
  - Damian de Allende
  - Juan de Jongh
  - Jean de Villiers
  - Ryno Eksteen
  - Dylon Frylinck
  - Peter Grant
  - Nic Groom
  - Cheslin Kolbe
  - Louis Schreuder
  - Seabelo Senatla
  - Sailosi Tagicakibau
  - Jaco Taute
  - Michael van der Spuy
  - Kobus van Wyk
  - Devon Williams
  - Did not play: Godlen Masimla
  - Gary van Aswegen
  - Coach: Allister Coetzee

==== Waratahs ====
  - Michael Alaalatoa
  - Mitchell Chapman
  - Dave Dennis
  - Kane Douglas
  - Tala Gray
  - Stephen Hoiles
  - Michael Hooper
  - Sekope Kepu
  - Tolu Latu
  - Pat McCutcheon
  - Wycliff Palu
  - Tatafu Polota-Nau
  - Jacques Potgieter
  - Hugh Roach
  - Benn Robinson
  - Paddy Ryan
  - Will Skelton
  - Jeremy Tilse
  - Did not play:
  - Jed Holloway
  Backs:
  - Alofa Alofa
  - Adam Ashley-Cooper
  - Kurtley Beale
  - Peter Betham
  - Matthew Carraro
  - Cam Crawford
  - Israel Folau
  - Bernard Foley
  - Rob Horne
  - Jono Lance
  - Brendan McKibbin
  - Taqele Naiyaravoro
  - Nick Phipps
  - Did not play: Michael Hodge
  - Ben Volavola
  - Coach: Michael Cheika

== Referees ==
The following refereeing panel was appointed by SANZAR for the 2014 Super Rugby season:

Prior to Round 7, Jason Jaftha, James Leckie, Francisco Pastrana and Lourens van der Merwe were removed from the refereeing panel, Jaftha due to an anterior cruciate ligament injury that would see him miss four months of the season and the latter three in a move by SANZAR to recognise "who has performed to expectation and who has not."

== Attendances ==
Team	Main Stadium	Capacity	Total Attendance	Average Attendance	% Capacity
Blues	Eden Park	50,000			
Chiefs	Waikato Stadium	25,800			
Hurricanes	Westpac Stadium	34,500	85,688	10,711	32%
Crusaders	Rugby League Park	19,600			
Highlanders	Forsyth Barr Stadium	30,728			
Reds	Suncorp Stadium	52,500	227,913	28,489	54%
Brumbies	Canberra Stadium	25,011			
Waratahs	Allianz Stadium	44,000			
Melbourne Rebels	AAMI Park	29,500			
Western Force	nib Stadium	20,500			
Sharks	ABSA Stadium	52,000			
Bulls	Loftus Versfeld	51,792			
Lions	Ellis Park	62,567			
Cheetahs	Free State Stadium	46,000			
Stormers	Newlands Stadium	51,900			
