= Warwick Tecklenburg =

South African rugby union player

- Full name: Warwick John Tecklenburg
- Born: 22 January 1987 (age 39) Nelspruit
- Height: 1.89 m (6 ft 2 1/2 in)
- Weight: 105 kg (16 st 7 lb; 231 lb)
- School: Uplands College, White River

Rugby union career
- Position: Flanker
Youth career
- 2005: Pumas
- 2006: Falcons
- 2007–2008: Blue Bulls
Amateur team(s)
| Years | Team | Apps | (Points) |
| 2008–2011 | UP Tuks | 14 | (20) |
Senior career
| Years | Team | Apps | (Points) |
| 2011–2012 | Blue Bulls | 22 | (20) |
| 2013–2016 | Golden Lions XV | 8 | (5) |
| 2013–2014 | Golden Lions | 23 | (15) |
| 2013–2016 | Lions | 47 | (30) |
| 2015–2016 | Kamaishi Seawaves | | |
- Correct as of 6 August 2016

Warwick John Tecklenburg is a former South African rugby union player, who played first class rugby between 2011 and 2016. He playing in Super Rugby for the Lions and domestically for the Golden Lions and Blue Bulls. He also played for Kamaishi Seawaves in the Japanese Top League East. His usual position is flanker.

He retired at the start of 2017 to join his family's farming business.

== Career ==
He represented Mpumalanga Country Districts at U18 level and the Falcons at U19 level before joining the Blue Bulls.

He made his first team debut for the Blue Bulls against Western Province in the 2011 Currie Cup Premier Division season.

He signed a two-year contract with the Golden Lions for the 2013 season. and played in both legs of the Lions' promotion/relegation matches after the 2013 Super Rugby season, which saw the Lions regain their spot in Super Rugby.

He was then included in the Lions squad for the 2014 Super Rugby season and made his Super Rugby debut in a 21–20 victory over the Cheetahs in Bloemfontein.

He also represented UP Tuks in the Varsity Cup.

He joined Japanese Top League side Kamaishi Seawaves for the 2015–2016 season.
