= Alofa Alofa =

Samoa international rugby union & league player

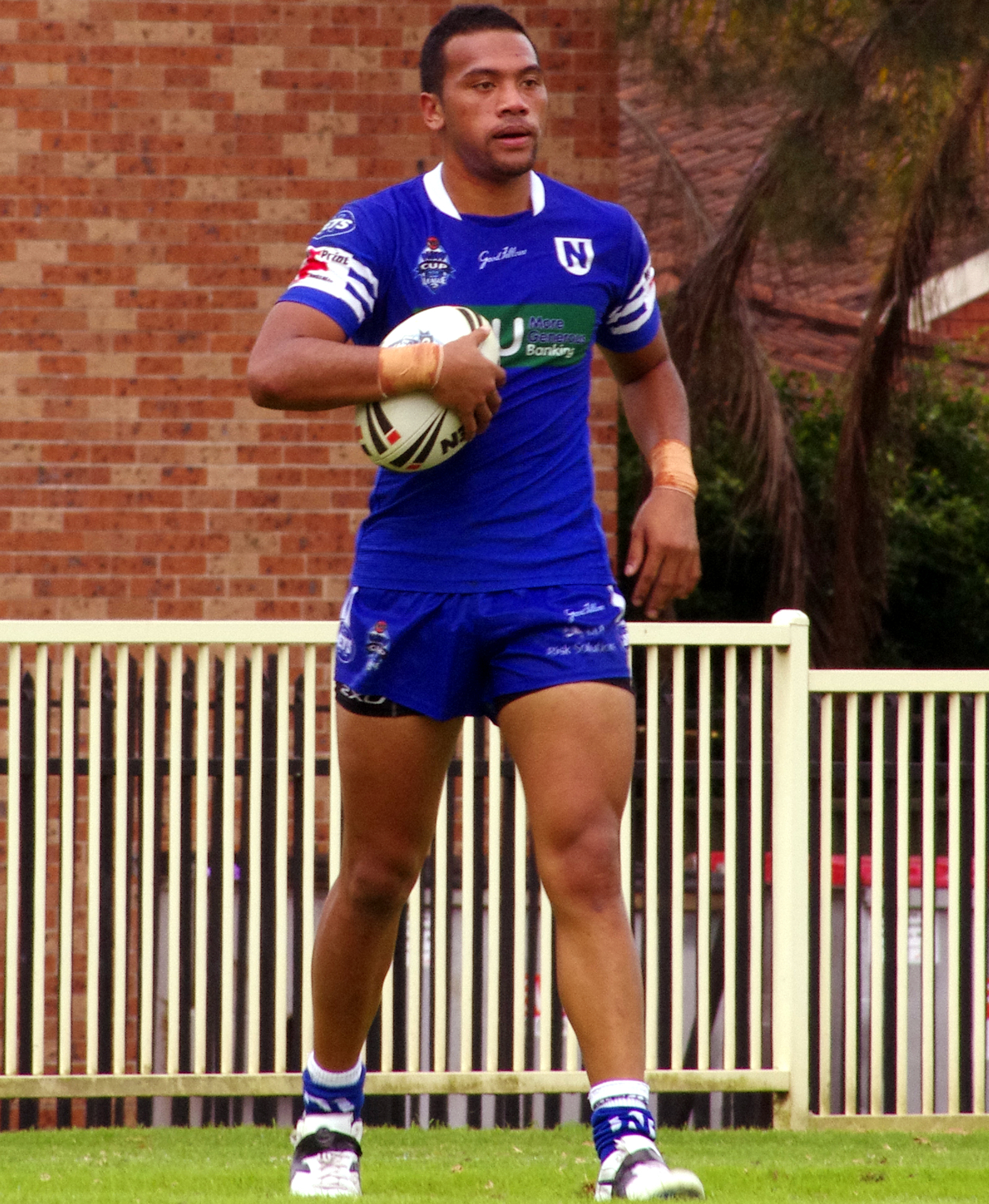
- Full name: Alofa Alofa
- Born: 12 March 1991 (age 35) Auckland, New Zealand
- Height: 1.85 m (6 ft 1 in)
- Weight: 94 kg (14 st 11 lb)
- School: Canterbury Boys' High School
- Occupation: Head Coach - Caboolture Rugby Union

Rugby union career
- Position: Wing/Centre
- Current team: Harlequins
- –: Harlequins
- –: Aviron Bayonnais
- –: Tarbes
Senior career
| Years | Team | Apps | (Points) |
| 2014–2016 | La Rochelle | 27 | (35) |
- Correct as of 15 December 2017
Provincial / State sides
| Years | Team | Apps | (Points) |
| 2013–2014 | West Harbour | 21 | (85) |
| 2016 | Randwick | 2 | (0) |
- Correct as of 15 December 2017
Super Rugby
| Years | Team | Apps | (Points) |
| 2014 | Waratahs | 15 | (25) |
- Correct as of 15 December 2017
International career
| Years | Team | Apps | (Points) |
| 2014– | Samoa | 6 | (0) |
- Sydney East Schools
- Combined High Schools
- Correct as of 25 October 2018
- Rugby league career

Playing information
- Position: Fullback
Club
| Years | Team | Pld | T | G | FG | P |
|---|---|---|---|---|---|---|
| 2011–12 | Sydney Roosters |

Alofa Alofa (born 12 March 1991) is a Samoan international rugby union footballer who plays as a centre for Harlequins in the English Gallagher Premiership.

== Background ==
Alofa was born in Auckland, New Zealand but emigrated to Australia with his family aged four.

== Career ==
=== Rugby League ===
He started out his professional career in rugby league with the Sydney Roosters, and switched to union in 2013.

=== Rugby Union ===
He scored 13 tries during the 2013 Shute Shield season, this brought him to the attention of the Waratahs who named him in their wider training group for the 2014 Super Rugby season. Alofa made his first appearance in week 1 of the campaign and marked his debut with a try in a 43–21 win over the WesternForce in Sydney.

Internationally, Alofa was eligible to play for New Zealand due to it being the country of his birth. He was also able to play for the Wallabies by virtue of residency, and Samoa through his Samoan born parents, the Samoan ministers Kaisala and Tusi. On 14 November 2014, he made his international debut for Samoa against Canada, starting on the right wing.

Named as Head Coach in 2026 for Caboolture Rugby Union in Brisbane Australia.
