= Tom McVerry =

- Full name: Tom McVerry
- Born: 30 June 1980 (age 46) Queensland, Australia
- Height: 1.86 m (6 ft 1 in)
- Weight: 104 kg (16 st 5 lb; 229 lb)
- School: Marist College Ashgrove

Rugby union career
- Position: Loose forward
- Current team: Brumbies
Youth career
- 2001–02: Reds
Senior career
Years	Team	Apps	(Points)
2003–07	Reds	55	(0)
2007	Ballymore Tornadoes	8	(0)
2012–14	Kyuden Voltex	23	(0)
2014	Brumbies	6	(5)
- Correct as of 21 July 2014
International career
Years	Team	Apps	(Points)
1997	Australia Schoolboys		
2007	Australia Sevens		
- Correct as of 5 May 2014

Tom McVerry (born 30 June 1980) is an Australian rugby union player who currently plays as a loose forward for the Brumbies in the international Super Rugby competition.

== Career ==
McVerry started out his career in Queensland, playing age-level rugby and then progressing on to the Reds Academy. He finally made the first team during the 2003 Super 12 season and went on to make 55 appearances for the franchise over the next 5 years. A brief stint with the Ballymore Tornadoes, whom he captained during the inaugural Australian Rugby Championship in 2007 followed before he tried his luck overseas, initially in Italy before settling down in Japan where he spent 6 seasons with Kyuden Voltex.

During his time in Japan, McVerry's wife suffered a brain tumour which forced him and his young family back to Australia's capital while she was undergoing treatment. This allied with an injury crisis which had severely depleted the Brumbies loose forward stocks saw him surprisingly handed a short-term contract until the end of the 2014 Super Rugby season.

== International ==
McVerry was an Australia Schoolboys representative in 1997 and also appeared for the Australia Sevens team at the 2006 Commonwealth Games in Melbourne.
