= Angus Roberts =

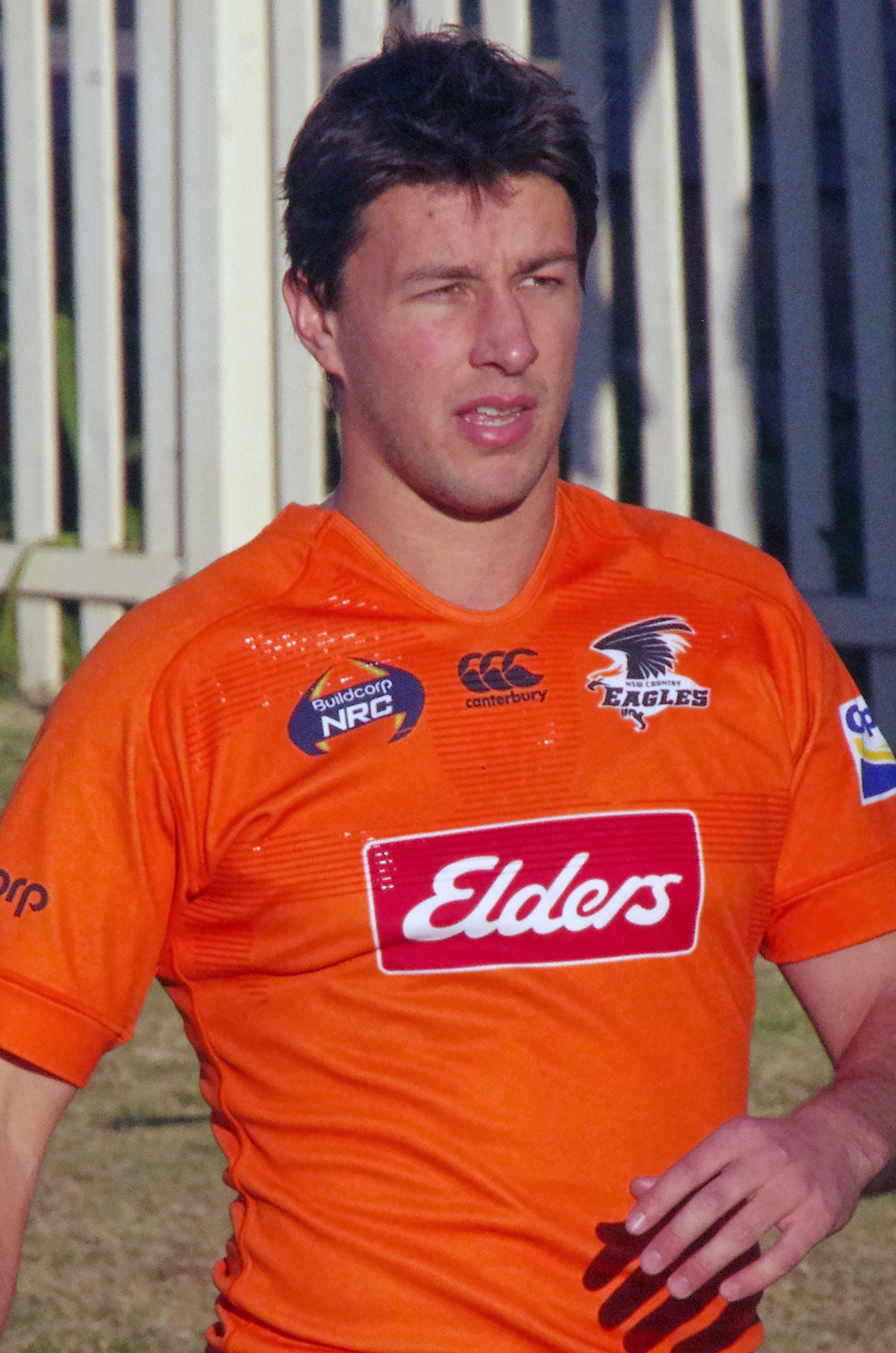
- Roberts in 2016
- Born: Angus Roberts; 17 December 1990 (age 35) New South Wales, Australia
- Height: 1.86 m (6 ft 1 in)
- Weight: 92 kg (14 st 7 lb)
- School: Saint Ignatius' College, Riverview
- University: University of Technology, Sydney

Rugby union career
- Position(s): Fullback, Fly Half
Senior career
Years	Team	Apps	(Points)
2010–	Sydney University		
2014–	Sydney Stars	10	(72)
- Correct as of 3 November 2015
Super Rugby
Years	Team	Apps	(Points)
2013–14	Rebels	14	(16)
- Correct as of 4 June 2014

Angus Roberts (born 17 December 1990) is a professional Australian rugby union player for the Melbourne Rebels. His preferred positions are fullback and flyhalf.

== Early career ==
Roberts was educated at Saint Ignatius' College, Riverview and represented his school in Rugby Union for six years.

He began playing rugby as a junior with the Gunnedah Red Devils. In 2012 he played for Sydney University in the Shute Shield. Roberts resided at St John's College from 2010 to 2012, playing rugby for the College in the intercollegiate Rawson Cup throughout this period.

The Sydney University Rugby Club 2012 season preview described him thus: "His strengths are his composure, speed of foot and long kicking game. Gus is quite a big 10 and has only been playing the position for a year now, to which he has already caught the eye of the Super Franchises. Gus has some silky skills and a great deal of potential, which he has worked hard on during the off season to develop."

He scored a last minute try and conversion that won the Sydney University the 2012 Shute Shield.

== Super Rugby ==
Roberts commenced in a two-year contract with the Melbourne Rebels in 2013. In March 2013, the Rebels named Roberts at fullback for the Round 4 battle with the Reds in Melbourne. This was to be his Super Rugby and Rebels debut.

== Personal life ==
For his gap year, Roberts travelled to Somerset in England. He worked as an assistant at Sexey's School and played rugby for Castle Cary RFC. In 2012 Roberts was in his third year of studying Exercise Management at The University of Technology Sydney.
