= Chris Tuatara-Morrison =

Australian rugby union football player

Personal information
- Born: Chris Tuatara; 11 September 1986 (age 40) Hastings, New Zealand
- Height: 1.89 m (6 ft 2 1/2 in)
- Weight: 100 kg (15 st 10 lb)

Playing information
- Position: Centre
Club
Years	Team	Pld	T	G	FG	P
2006	Canterbury-Bankstown	2				0

Rugby union career
- Position: Inside-Centre
Senior career
Years	Team	Apps	(Points)
2014	→Castres	4	(5)
2014−	Brive	1	(0)
- Correct as of 5 December 2014
Super Rugby
Years	Team	Apps	(Points)
2013–14	Force	10	(10)
- Correct as of 13 July 2014

Chris Tuatara-Morrison (born Chris Tuatara, 11 September 1986) is an Australian rugby union footballer. His regular playing position is inside-centre. He previously played for the Western Force in Super Rugby, and currently plays in the French Top 14 league for Brive.

== Early life ==
Chris Tuatara was born in Hastings, New Zealand. He was raised by his mother Moana Tuatara and moved with her to Sydney, Australia, when he was a young boy. He did not know the identity of his father, Howard Morrison Jnr (son of the entertainer Sir Howard Morrison), until he was 13 years old. Later as an adult, Chris Tuatara changed his name to Chris Tuatara-Morrison.

In Sydney, young Chris Tuatara played junior rugby league for the Asquith Magpies club. He played rugby union for Turramurra High School. During his final year at Turramurra in 2004, he was selected to represent New South Wales II at the Australian Schools Rugby Championships.

== Career ==
=== Rugby League ===
In 2005, Chris Tuatara played NSWRL Premier League for the North Sydney Bears (then affiliated with Melbourne Storm). For the following season, 2006, he was signed by NRL club Canterbury Bulldogs. He made two First Grade trial appearances against Cronulla Sharks and New Zealand Warriors and then played in the NSWRL Premier League for the Bulldogs.

Chris Tuatara-Morrison then had several seasons in the New South Wales Cup. In 2008, he played for Balmain Ryde-Eastwood (affiliated with Wests Tigers). Then in 2009 and 2010, he played for Newtown Jets (affiliated with Sydney Roosters). In 2011, he played for Western Suburbs Magpies (affiliated with Wests Tigers).

=== Rugby Union ===
Between rugby league seasons, Tuatara-Morrison had brief stints playing rugby union. He played some Shute Shield matches for Gordon in 2009 in Sydney. In 2011 in England he played for National 3 South West club Oxford Harlequins before his season was cut short with a broken foot.

In 2012, Scott Fava, coach of Northern Suburbs Rugby Club, convinced Tuatara-Morrison to focus on playing rugby union. He turned down a contract with French rugby league club Catalans and his impressive performances for Northern Suburbs in the 2012 Shute Shield competition led to Super Rugby franchise Western Force signing him to a two-year contract until 2014.

==== France ====
Tuatara signed a three-month deal with Castres Olympique in August 2014 as cover for injured former All Black Sitiveni Sivivatu, before joining Brive in November 2014.
