= 2019 Lions (Super Rugby) season =

Lions
- 2019 season
- Head coach: Swys de Bruin
- Captain: Warren Whiteley
- Stadium: Emirates Airline Park, Johannesburg
- Overall: 8th
- South African Conference: 4th
- Record: Won 8, Lost 8
- Top try scorer: All: Kwagga Smith (7)
- Top points scorer: All: Elton Jantjies (124)

In 2019, the Lions participated in the 2019 Super Rugby competition, the 24th edition of the competition since its inception in 1996. They were included in the South African Conference of the competition, along with the Bulls, Jaguares, Sharks and Stormers.

The Lions won eight and lost eight of their matches during the regular season of the competition to finish fourth in the South African Conference, and in 8th place overall, failing to qualify for the finals.

== Personnel ==
=== Coaches and management ===
The Lions coaches and management staff for the 2019 Super Rugby season is yet to be announced.

=== Squad ===
The Lions squad for the 2019 Super Rugby season is yet to be announced.

== Standings ==
2019 Super Rugby standings
Pos	Team	Pld	W	D	L	PF	PA	PD	TF	TA	TB	LB	Pts	Qualification
1	Crusaders (C)	16	11	3	2	497	257	+240	73	31	8	0	58	Quarter-finals (Conference leaders)
2	Jaguares	16	11	0	5	461	352	+109	60	38	5	2	51	Quarter-finals (Conference leaders)
3	Brumbies	16	10	0	6	430	366	+64	65	49	5	3	48	Quarter-finals (Conference leaders)
4	Hurricanes	16	12	1	3	449	362	+87	60	46	3	0	53	Quarter-finals (Wildcard)
5	Bulls	16	8	2	6	410	369	+41	42	50	3	2	41	Quarter-finals (Wildcard)
6	Sharks	16	7	1	8	343	335	+8	40	39	3	4	37	Quarter-finals (Wildcard)
7	Chiefs	16	7	2	7	451	465	−14	63	59	2	2	36	Quarter-finals (Wildcard)
8	Highlanders	16	6	3	7	441	392	+49	60	53	2	4	36	Quarter-finals (Wildcard)
9	Lions	16	8	0	8	401	478	−77	53	64	2	1	35	
10	Stormers	16	7	1	8	344	366	−22	34	46	1	4	35	
11	Rebels	16	7	0	9	393	465	−72	56	61	3	3	34	
12	Waratahs	16	6	0	10	367	415	−48	46	54	0	6	30	
13	Blues	16	5	1	10	347	369	−22	45	47	2	6	30	
14	Reds	16	6	0	10	385	438	−53	50	59	1	3	28	
15	Sunwolves	16	2	0	14	294	584	−290	34	85	0	4	12	

Source: Super Rugby

=== Round-by-round ===
The table below shows the Lions' progression throughout the season. For each round, their cumulative points total is shown with the overall log position:

Team	R1	R2	R3	R4	R5	R6	R7	R8	R9	R10	R11	R12	R13	R14	R15	R16	R17	R18	QF	SF	Final
Opposition	JAG	STO	BUL	JAG	REB	SUN	Bye	SHA	BRU	CHI	CRU	Bye	WAR	HIG	SHA	STO	HUR	BUL			
Cumulative Points																					
Position (overall)																					
Position (SA Conf.)																					
Key:	win	draw	loss	bye																	

== Matches ==
The Lions played the following matches during the 2019 Super Rugby season:

16 February 2019	Jaguares	16–25	Lions	José Amalfitani Stadium, Buenos Aires
23:40	Try: Santiago Medrano 15'; Con: Joaquín Díaz Bonilla 16'; Pen: Joaquín Díaz Bonilla 12', 25', 59'	Scoreboard	Try: Marnus Schoeman 2', 31', 49'; Con: Elton Jantjies 32', 50'; Pen: Elton Jantjies 28', 69'	Referee: Mike Fraser

23 February 2019	Stormers	19–17	Lions	DHL Newlands, Cape Town
17:15	Try: Herschel Jantjies 84'; Con: SP Marais 86'; Pen: SP Marais 11', 28', 50', 60'	Scoreboard	Try: Kwagga Smith 5'; Warren Whiteley 19'; Con: Elton Jantjies 6', 21'; Pen: Elton Jantjies 63'	Referee: Egon Seconds

2 March 2019	Lions	12–30	Bulls	Emirates Airline Park, Johannesburg
15:05	Try: Carlü Sadie 47'; Dylan Smith 65'; Con: Elton Jantjies 65'	Scoreboard	Try: Duane Vermeulen 28'; Warrick Gelant 74'; Con: Handré Pollard 75'; Pen: Handré Pollard 13', 26', 37', 43', 57', 62'	Referee: Paul Williams

9 March 2019	Lions	47–39	Jaguares	Emirates Airline Park, Johannesburg
15:05	Try: Rhyno Herbst 14'; Elton Jantjies 23'; Kwagga Smith 26'; Wandisile Simelane 34'; Marnus Schoeman 44'; Courtnall Skosan 46', 49'; Con: Elton Jantjies 16', 24', 35', 45', 47', 52'	Scoreboard	Try: Ramiro Moyano 31'; Julián Montoya 38', 53'; Gaspar Baldunciel 71'; Matías Moroni 79'; Joaquín Tuculet 80'; Con: Joaquín Díaz Bonilla 54'; Juan Cruz Mallia 72', 81'; Pen: Joaquín Díaz Bonilla 18'	Referee: Rasta Rasivhenge

16 March 2019	Lions	36–33	Rebels	Emirates Airline Park, Johannesburg
15:05	Try: Malcolm Marx 4'; Marnus Schoeman 49'; Andries Coetzee 52'; Lionel Mapoe 55'; Courtnall Skosan 63'; Con: Elton Jantjies 50', 54', 56', 64'; Pen: Gianni Lombard 81'	Scoreboard	Try: Reece Hodge 7'; Quade Cooper 11'; Bill Meakes 19'; Isi Naisarani 22'; Tom English 41'; Con: Quade Cooper 13', 20', 23', 42'	Referee: Egon Seconds

23 March 2019	Sunwolves	24–37	Lions	National Stadium, Singapore
12:55	Try: penalty try 5'; Rahboni Warren-Vosayaco 64', 78'; Con: Hayden Parker 65', 79'; Pen: Hayden Parker 41'	Scoreboard	Try: Malcolm Marx 12', 35'; Nic Groom 51'; Elton Jantjies 56'; Lionel Mapoe 60'; Hacjivah Dayimani 74'; Con: Elton Jantjies 13', 61'; Pen: Elton Jantjies 68'	Referee: Damon Murphy

5 April 2019	Lions	5–42	Sharks	Emirates Airline Park, Johannesburg
19:10	Try: Sylvian Mahuza 78'	Scoreboard	Try: Jacques Vermeulen 18'; Makazole Mapimpi 21', 37'; Lukhanyo Am 26'; Thomas du Toit 71'; Aphelele Fassi 81'; Con: Robert du Preez 27'; Curwin Bosch 72', 82'; Pen: Robert du Preez 30'; Curwin Bosch 47'	Referee: Mike Fraser

13 April 2019	Brumbies	31–20	Lions	GIO Stadium, Canberra
11:45	Try: Lachlan McCaffrey 20'; Toni Pulu 26'; Tevita Kuridrani 38'; Tom Banks 54'; Tom Wright 57'; Con: Christian Lealiifano 21', 27', 59'	Scoreboard	Try: Aphiwe Dyantyi 6'; Elton Jantjies 49'; Sylvian Mahuza 69'; Con: Elton Jantjies 49'; Pen: Elton Jantjies 24'	Referee: Rasta Rasivhenge

19 April 2019	Chiefs	17–23	Lions	FMG Stadium Waikato, Hamilton
9:35	Try: Sean Wainui 60'; Nepo Laulala 63'; Tumua Manu 75'; Con: Marty McKenzie 77'	Scoreboard	Try: Carlü Sadie 35'; Aphiwe Dyantyi 39'; Con: Elton Jantjies 36', 40'; Pen: Elton Jantjies 9', 29'; Drop: Elton Jantjies 79'	Referee: Brendon Pickerill

26 April 2019	Crusaders	36–10	Lions	AMI Stadium, Christchurch
9:35	Try: Braydon Ennor 4'; Sevu Reece 34', 57'; George Bridge 48', 50'; Con: Richie Mo'unga 5', 35', 48', 51'; Pen: Richie Mo'unga 9'	Scoreboard	Try: Ruan Combrinck 52'; Con: Elton Jantjies 53'; Pen: Elton Jantjies 18'	Referee: Paul Williams

11 May 2019	Lions	29–28	Waratahs	Emirates Airline Park, Johannesburg
15:05	Try: Aphiwe Dyantyi 10'; Stephan Lewies 17'; Kwagga Smith 32'; Courtnall Skosan 42'; Con: Elton Jantjies 10', 19', 44'; Pen: Shaun Reynolds 67'	Scoreboard	Try: Nick Phipps 3'; Michael Hooper 12'; Rob Simmons 26'; Tom Staniforth 55'; Con: Bernard Foley 5', 13', 27', 57'	Referee: Egon Seconds

18 May 2019	Lions	38–29	Highlanders	Emirates Airline Park, Johannesburg
15:05	Try: Andries Coetzee 13'; Kwagga Smith 38', 51'; Shaun Reynolds 70'; Courtnall Skosan 78'; Con: Elton Jantjies 13', 38', 52', 71', 80'; Pen: Elton Jantjies 63'	Scoreboard	Try: Sio Tomkinson 4'; Tom Franklin 34'; Jordan Hyland 56'; Matt Faddes 59'; Josh Ioane 73'; Con: Josh Ioane 35'; Dan Hollinshead 74'	Referee: Rasta Rasivhenge

25 May 2019	Sharks	27–17	Lions	Jonsson Kings Park, Durban
17:15	Try: Curwin Bosch 16'; Dan du Preez 22'; Makazole Mapimpi 59'; Con: Curwin Bosch 17', 24', 60'; Pen: Curwin Bosch 53', 76'	Scoreboard	Try: Lionel Mapoe 30'; Cyle Brink 48'; Con: Elton Jantjies 32', 49'; Pen: Elton Jantjies 73'	Referee: Marius van der Westhuizen

1 June 2019	Lions	41–22	Stormers	Emirates Airline Park, Johannesburg
17:15	Try: Kwagga Smith 9', 43'; Andries Coetzee 34'; Courtnall Skosan 47'; Aphiwe Dyantyi 56'; Hacjivah Dayimani 77'; Con: Shaun Reynolds 44', 48', 57', 79'; Pen: Shaun Reynolds 27'	Scoreboard	Try: Johan du Toit 38'; Herschel Jantjies 52'; Joshua Stander 65'; Con: Joshua Stander 39', 53'; Pen: Joshua Stander 32'	Referee: Marius van der Westhuizen

8 June 2019	Lions	17–37	Hurricanes	Emirates Airline Park, Johannesburg
15:05	Try: Aphiwe Dyantyi 9', 58'; Con: Shaun Reynolds 10', 59'; Pen: Shaun Reynolds 20'	Scoreboard	Try: Ngani Laumape 6'; Ben Lam 40', 47'; Dane Coles 64', 75'; Con: Jordie Barrett 7', 41', 65'; Pen: Jordie Barrett 38', 46'	Referee: Jaco Peyper

15 June 2019	Bulls	48–27	Lions	Loftus Versfeld, Pretoria
17:15	Try: Hanro Liebenberg 3'; Marco van Staden 10'; Lizo Gqoboka 15'; Burger Odendaal 19'; Cornal Hendricks 59'; Handré Pollard 64'; Manie Libbok 70'; Con: Handré Pollard 4', 11', 16', 19', 65'; Pen: Handré Pollard 24'	Scoreboard	Try: Hacjivah Dayimani 0'; Cyle Brink 55'; Con: Elton Jantjies 1'; Pen: Elton Jantjies 9', 29', 36', 42'; Drop: Andries Coetzee 14'	Referee: Marius van der Westhuizen

== Player statistics ==
The Super Rugby appearance record for players that represented the Lions in 2019 is as follows:

Lions
Name	JAG	STO	BUL	JAG	REB	SUN	SHA	BRU	CHI	CRU	WAR	HIG	SHA	STO	HUR	BUL	QF	SF	F	App	Try	Con	Pen	DG	Pts
Dylan Smith	1	1	1	1	1						17 (substituted in)	1	1	1	1	1	—	—	—	11	1	0	0	0	5
Malcolm Marx	2	2	2	2	2	2	2	2	2		2	2		2	2	2	—	—	—	14	3	0	0	0	15
Carlü Sadie	3	3	3	3	3	3	3	18 (substituted in)	3	3	3	3	18 (substituted in)	3	3	3	—	—	—	16	2	0	0	0	10
Rhyno Herbst	4	19 (substituted in)	4	5	19 (substituted in)	4	4	4								4	—	—	—	9	1	0	0	0	5
Marvin Orie	5	4			4	5	5	5	5	5	5	5	5	5	5	5	—	—	—	14	0	0	0	0	0
Marnus Schoeman	6	6	6	6	6	6	6	20 (substituted in)	20 (substituted in)	6	20 (substituted in)	6	6	20 (substituted in)	20 (substituted in)	20 (substituted in)	—	—	—	16	5	0	0	0	25
Hacjivah Dayimani	7	20 (substituted in)	8			19 (substituted in)	22 (substituted in)	8		20 (substituted in)		20 (substituted in)	21 (substituted in)	21 (substituted in)	19 (substituted in)	8	—	—	—	12	3	0	0	0	15
Warren Whiteley	8	8							8		8						—	—	—	4	1	0	0	0	5
Nic Groom	9	9	9			9	21 (substituted in)	9	21 (substituted in)	9	21 (substituted in)	21 (substituted in)	9	22 (substituted in)	21 (substituted in)		—	—	—	13	1	0	0	0	5
Elton Jantjies	10	10	10	10	10	10	10	10	12	12	10	10	10		22 (substituted in)	12	—	—	—	15	3	32	14	1	124
Aphiwe Dyantyi	11	22 (substituted in)	11			23 (substituted in)	13	11	11	11	11	11	11	11	11	11	—	—	—	14	6	0	0	0	30
Harold Vorster	12	12	12	22 (substituted in)							12	12	12	12	12		—	—	—	9	0	0	0	0	0
Lionel Mapoe	13	13	13		22 (substituted in)	12	12	13	13	13	13	13	13	13	13	13	—	—	—	15	3	0	0	0	15
Courtnall Skosan	14	11	23 (substituted in)	11	11	11	11				14	14	14	14	14	23 (substituted in)	—	—	—	13	6	0	0	0	30
Andries Coetzee	15	15	15	15	23 (substituted in)		15	15	15		15	15	15	15	15	15	—	—	—	14	3	0	0	1	18
Pieter Jansen	16 (substituted in)	16	16 (substituted in)	16 (substituted in)									16 (substituted in)				—	—	—	4	0	0	0	0	0
Frans van Wyk	17 (substituted in)		18 (substituted in)	18 (substituted in)	18 (substituted in)	18 (substituted in)			17 (substituted in)								—	—	—	6	0	0	0	0	0
Jacobie Adriaanse	18 (substituted in)	18 (substituted in)					18 (substituted in)										—	—	—	3	0	0	0	0	0
Ruan Vermaak	19 (substituted in)			4	20 (substituted in)	8	8										—	—	—	5	0	0	0	0	0
Robert Kruger	20 (substituted in)		19 (substituted in)														—	—	—	2	0	0	0	0	0
Dillon Smit	21 (substituted in)			21 (substituted in)												21 (substituted in)	—	—	—	3	0	0	0	0	0
Wandisile Simelane	22 (substituted in)			13	13	13										22 (substituted in)	—	—	—	5	1	0	0	0	5
Ruan Combrinck	23 (substituted in)	14	14		14			14	23	15							—	—	—	6	1	0	0	0	5
Stephan Lewies		5	5	19 (substituted in)	5	7	20 (substituted in)	7	4	4	4	4	4	4			—	—	—	13	1	0	0	0	5
Kwagga Smith		7	7	8	8				6	8	6	8	8	8	8		—	—	—	11	7	0	0	0	35
Sti Sithole		17 (substituted in)	17 (substituted in)		17 (substituted in)	1	1	17 (substituted in)	1	1	1	17 (substituted in)	17 (substituted in)	17 (substituted in)			—	—	—	12	0	0	0	0	0
Gianni Lombard		21 (substituted in)		23 (substituted in)	21 (substituted in)	22 (substituted in)		22 (substituted in)	10								—	—	—	6	0	0	1	0	3
Sylvian Mahuza		23		14		14	23 (substituted in)	23 (substituted in)	14	14							—	—	—	6	2	0	0	0	10
Vincent Tshituka			20 (substituted in)	7	7						7	19 (substituted in)	20 (substituted in)	7	7	7	—	—	—	9	0	0	0	0	0
Ross Cronjé			21 (substituted in)	9	9	21 (substituted in)	9	21 (substituted in)	9	21 (substituted in)	9	9		9	9	9	—	—	—	13	0	0	0	0	0
Franco Naudé			22 (substituted in)	12	12			12	22 (substituted in)	22 (substituted in)							—	—	—	6	0	0	0	0	0
Nathan McBeth				17 (substituted in)		17 (substituted in)	17 (substituted in)	1		17 (substituted in)					17 (substituted in)	17 (substituted in)	—	—	—	7	0	0	0	0	0
James Venter				20 (substituted in)		20 (substituted in)											—	—	—	2	0	0	0	0	0
Tyrone Green					15	15	14			23 (substituted in)	23 (substituted in)	23 (substituted in)	23 (substituted in)	23 (substituted in)	23 (substituted in)	14	—	—	—	10	0	0	0	0	0
Jan-Henning Campher					16 (substituted in)		16 (substituted in)			16 (substituted in)	16	16 (substituted in)	2	16 (substituted in)	16 (substituted in)	16 (substituted in)	—	—	—	8	0	0	0	0	0
Robbie Coetzee						16 (substituted in)		16 (substituted in)	16	2							—	—	—	3	0	0	0	0	0
Cyle Brink							7	6	7	7		7	7	6	6	6	—	—	—	9	2	0	0	0	10
Wilhelm van der Sluys							19 (substituted in)	19 (substituted in)	19 (substituted in)	19 (substituted in)	19 (substituted in)						—	—	—	5	0	0	0	0	0
Johannes Jonker								3	18 (substituted in)	18 (substituted in)	18 (substituted in)	18 (substituted in)	3	18 (substituted in)	18 (substituted in)	18 (substituted in)	—	—	—	9	0	0	0	0	0
Shaun Reynolds										10	22 (substituted in)	22 (substituted in)	22 (substituted in)	10	10	10	—	—	—	7	1	6	3	0	26
Reinhard Nothnagel													19 (substituted in)	19 (substituted in)	4	19 (substituted in)	—	—	—	4	0	0	0	0	0
Total																				16	53	38	18	2	401

(c) denotes the team captain. For each match, the player's squad number is shown. Starting players are numbered 1 to 15, while the replacements are numbered 16 to 23. If a replacement made an appearance in the match, it is indicated by (substituted in) . "App" refers to the number of appearances made by the player, "Try" to the number of tries scored by the player, "Con" to the number of conversions kicked, "Pen" to the number of penalties kicked, "DG" to the number of drop goals kicked and "Pts" refer to the total number of points scored by the player.

- Jo-Hanko de Villiers, Lourens Erasmus, Chergin Fillies, Eddie Fouché, Jan-Louis la Grange, Len Massyn, Danie Mienie, Manuel Rass, Madosh Tambwe, PJ Steenkamp, Bradley Thain, Morné van den Berg, Wayne van der Bank and Louritz van der Schyff did not make any appearances.

== See also ==
- Lions
- 2019 Super Rugby season
