= 2016 Super Rugby final =

Men's rugby union club competition

2016 Super Rugby Final
- Event: 2016 Super Rugby season
Hurricanes	Lions
(New Zealand)	(South Africa)
20	3
- Date: 6 August 2016
- Venue: Westpac Stadium, Wellington
- Referee: Glen Jackson (New Zealand)
- Attendance: 39,000

The 2016 Super Rugby Final was played between the Hurricanes and the Lions. It was the 21st final in the Super Rugby competition's history and the first under the expanded 18-team format. The Hurricanes had qualified in first place of the log standings during the regular season, while the Lions had qualified in second place. Both teams hosted quarter-final and semi-final matches. In the quarter-finals the Hurricanes beat the Sharks while the Lions beat the record Super rugby winners Crusaders. For the semi-finals it was the Hurricanes defeating fellow New Zealand team Chiefs in Wellington and the Lions defeating New Zealand team Highlanders in Johannesburg. Because of being the higher placed team in the regular season log standings, the final was held in Wellington.

The Final attracted a crowd attendance of 39,000.

== Road to the Final ==
Finals Series qualifying teams
Pos	Team	W	D	L	PD	BP	Pts
1	(New Zealand) Hurricanes	11	0	4	+144	9	53
2	(South Africa) Lions	11	0	4	+186	8	52
3	(South Africa) Stormers	10	1	4	+166	9	51
4	(Australia) Brumbies	10	0	5	+99	3	43
Wildcard teams
5	(New Zealand) Highlanders	11	0	4	+149	8	52
6	(New Zealand) Chiefs	11	0	4	+150	7	51
7	(New Zealand) Crusaders	11	0	4	+170	6	50
8	(South Africa) Sharks	9	1	5	+91	5	43
Source: SANZAAR

The 2016 Super Rugby competition involved an expanded 18-team format. The 18 teams were grouped geographically in two regional groups, each consisting of two conferences: the Australasian Group, with five teams in the Australian Conference and five teams in the New Zealand Conference and the South African Group, with six South African teams, one Argentinean team and one Japanese team split into a four-team Africa 1 Conference and a four-team Africa 2 Conference. The four conference winners qualified for the Quarter Finals, where they had home ground advantage against the four wildcard teams, made up of the third to fifth placed teams in the Australasian Group and the third placed team in the South African Group.

In the quarter-finals, there were wins for Highlanders over the Brumbies, Hurricanes beat Sharks while keeping them with no points, Lions beat Crusaders and Chiefs triumphing over Stormers. In the semi-finals, the Hurricanes defeated Chiefs in Wellington and the Lions defeated Highlanders in Johannesburg. The Hurricanes won their first title by defeating Lions.

The play-off fixtures were as follows:

Quarter-finals
23 July – Wellington
Hurricanes	41
Sharks	0
23 July – Cape Town
Stormers	21
Chiefs	60
23 July – Johannesburg
Lions	42
Crusaders	25
22 July – Canberra
Brumbies	9
Highlanders	15

Semi-finals
30 July – Wellington
Hurricanes	25
Chiefs	9
30 July – Johannesburg
Lions	42
Highlanders	30

Final
6 August – Wellington
Hurricanes	20
Lions	3

=== Quarter-finals ===
22 July 2016	Brumbies	9–15	Highlanders	GIO Stadium, Canberra
18:00	Pen: Christian Lealiifano 11', 18', 52' (3/5); Cards: Matt To'omua (yellow card) 37' to 47'	Report; Scoreboard	Try: Waisake Naholo 37'; Liam Squire 57'; Con: Lima Sopoaga 38' (1/2); Pen: Lima Sopoaga 5' (1/3)	Attendance: 8,559; Referee: Angus Gardner

23 July 2016	Hurricanes	41–0	Sharks	Westpac Stadium, Wellington
19:35	Try: Loni Uhila 17'; James Marshall 21'; Jason Woodward 47'; Vaea Fifita 50'; TJ Perenara 59'; Brad Shields 80'; Con: Beauden Barrett 48', 51', 60' (3/5); Jason Woodward 81' (1/1); Pen: Beauden Barrett 14' (1/1)	Report; Scoreboard	Pen: Garth April (0/3)	Referee: Glen Jackson

23 July 2016	Lions	42–25	Crusaders	Ellis Park Stadium, Johannesburg
16:30	Try: Courtnall Skosan 2'; Rohan Janse van Rensburg 7'; Malcolm Marx 40'; Ruan Combrinck 69'; Ross Cronjé 74'; Con: Elton Jantjies 8', 40', 70', 75' (4/5); Pen: Elton Jantjies 15', 62' (2/3); Drop: Elton Jantjies 54' (1/1)	Report; Scoreboard	Try: Ryan Crotty 33'; Mitchell Drummond 63'; Ben Volavola 80'; Con: Richie Mo'unga 34', 63' (2/3); Pen: Richie Mo'unga 20', 47' (2/2); Cards: Luke Romano (yellow card) 6' to 16'	Referee: Craig Joubert

23 July 2016	Stormers	21–60	Chiefs	Newlands Stadium, Cape Town
19:00	Try: Vincent Koch 11', 39'; Nizaam Carr 72'; Con: Robert du Preez 12', 40' (2/2); Brandon Thomson 73' (1/1)	Report; Scoreboard	Try: Sam McNicol 14'; Brad Weber 17'; Tom Sanders 24'; James Lowe 34'; Damian McKenzie 46'; Hika Elliot 75'; Tevita Koloamatangi 79'; Tawera Kerr-Barlow 81'; Con: Damian McKenzie 15', 18', 25', 35', 76', 80', 82' (7/8); Pen: Damian McKenzie 4', 29' (2/2)	Referee: Jaco Peyper

=== Semi-finals ===
30 July 2016	Hurricanes	25–9	Chiefs	Westpac Stadium, Wellington
19:35	Try: Willis Halaholo 7'; Beauden Barrett 35'; Victor Vito 48'; Con: Beauden Barrett 36', 49' (2/3); Pen: Beauden Barrett 33', 56' (2/2); Cards: Cory Jane (yellow card) 63' to 73'	Report; Scoreboard	Pen: Damian McKenzie 11', 40', 52' (3/4)	Referee: Angus Gardner

30 July 2016	Lions	42–30	Highlanders	Ellis Park Stadium, Johannesburg
15:00	Try: Elton Jantjies 12'; Rohan Janse van Rensburg 24'; Courtnall Skosan 46'; Jaco Kriel 55'; Lourens Erasmus 73'; Con: Elton Jantjies 13', 25', 56', 74' (4/5); Pen: Ruan Combrinck (0/1); Elton Jantjies 21', 45', 52' (3/3); Drop: Elton Jantjies (0/1)	Report; Scoreboard	Try: Matt Faddes 48'; Lima Sopoaga 66'; Waisake Naholo 75'; Joe Wheeler 82'; Con: Lima Sopoaga 76', 82' (2/4); Pen: Lima Sopoaga 19', 40' (2/3)	Referee: Jaco Peyper

=== Final ===
==== Summary ====
The Hurricanes won their first Super Rugby title with a dominant 20–3 win over the Lions in Wellington with tries from Cory Jane and man-of-the-match Beauden Barrett. Victor Vito celebrated his 100th and final match for the Wellington-based side in style. Tries were difficult to get with the wet, cold and windy weather conditions with both tries scored off Lions mistakes and Barrett chipped in with 10 points from the boot with two conversions and two penalties to spark tumultuous scenes in the packed stadium. The Lions were unable to find a way to unlock the Hurricanes defence, while Elton Jantjies had a forgettable night in front of goal, scoring only one of his three kicks. The match began with Jantjies missing an early penalty and Jane had a try disallowed in the 6th minute after the TMO ruled correctly that Brad Shields had knocked-on in the build-up. The veteran winger was not to be denied for long, in the 22nd minute when the Hurricanes defence again proved its worth causing Jantjies to throw a wild pass under pressure in his own 22, forcing Lionel Mapoe to make a clearing kick, but the ball went straight to Jane, who raced in to score at the corner. Barrett slotted the conversion to add to the earlier 11th-minute penalty to give the Hurricanes a 10–0 lead. Jantjies reduced the deficit with a penalty three minutes later.

Barrett extended his side's lead to 13–3 with another penalty midway through the second half. The match was effectively ended as a contest 11 minutes from full-time when the Lions botched a lineout clearance close to their own line. Replacement hooker Ricky Riccitelli hacked the ball on and the fly-half pounced on it inside the Lions in-goal area for his side's second try making Hurricanes to become the fifth New Zealand side to be crowned Super champions having previously lost both the 2006 and 2015 finals as well as being five times beaten semi-finalists.

==== Details ====
6 August 2016
19:35

Hurricanes	20–3	Lions
Try: Cory Jane 22'; Beauden Barrett 69'; Con: Beauden Barrett 23', 70' (2/2); Pen: Beauden Barrett 12', 52' (2/2); Drop: Beauden Barrett (0/1); James Marshall (0/1)	Report; Scoreboard	Pen: Elton Jantjies 26' (1/3)

Westpac Stadium, Wellington
Referee: Glen Jackson

Hurricanes	Lions

Hurricanes:
FB	15	James Marshall
RW	14	Cory Jane
OC	13	Matt Proctor
IC	12	Willis Halaholo	(substituted off) 50'
LW	11	Jason Woodward	(substituted off) 70'
FH	10	Beauden Barrett
SH	9	TJ Perenara	(substituted off) 77'
N8	8	Victor Vito
OF	7	Ardie Savea
BF	6	Brad Shields	(substituted off) 74'
LL	5	Michael Fatialofa	(substituted off) 74'
RL	4	Vaea Fifita
TP	3	Ben May	(substituted off) 52'
HK	2	Dane Coles (c)	(substituted off) 43'	(substituted on) 57'	(substituted off) 60'
LP	1	Loni Uhila	(substituted off) 76'
Substitutes:
HK	16	Ricky Riccitelli	(substituted on) 43'	(substituted off) 57'	(substituted on) 60'
PR	17	Chris Eves	(substituted on) 52'
PR	18	Mike Kainga	(substituted on) 76'
LK	19	Mark Abbott	(substituted on) 74'
FL	20	Callum Gibbins	(substituted on) 74'
FL	21	Jamison Gibson-Park	(substituted on) 77'
SH	22	Vince Aso	(substituted on) 50'
WG	23	Julian Savea	(substituted on) 70'
Coach:
(New Zealand) Chris Boyd

Lions:
FB	15	Andries Coetzee	(substituted off) 70'
RW	14	Ruan Combrinck
OC	13	Lionel Mapoe
IC	12	Rohan Janse van Rensburg	(substituted off) 57'	(substituted on) 65'	(substituted off) 74'
LW	11	Courtnall Skosan
FH	10	Elton Jantjies
SH	9	Faf de Klerk	(substituted off) 68'
N8	8	Warren Whiteley (c)	(substituted off) 70'
BF	7	Warwick Tecklenburg
OF	6	Jaco Kriel
LL	5	Franco Mostert
RL	4	Andries Ferreira	(substituted off) 74'
TP	3	Julian Redelinghuys	(substituted off) 74'
HK	2	Malcolm Marx	(substituted off) 70'
LP	1	Dylan Smith	(substituted off) 70'
Substitutes:
HK	16	Akker van der Merwe	(substituted on) 70'
PR	17	Corné Fourie	(substituted on) 70'
PR	18	Jacques van Rooyen	(substituted on) 74'
LK	19	Lourens Erasmus	(substituted on) 74'
FL	20	Ruan Ackermann	(substituted on) 70'
SH	21	Ross Cronjé	(substituted on) 68'
FH	22	Howard Mnisi	(substituted on) 57'	(substituted off) 65'	(substituted on) 74'
WG	23	Jaco van der Walt |	(substituted on) 70'
Coach:
(South Africa) Johan Ackermann

Man of the Match:
Beauden Barrett (Hurricanes)

Assistant Referees:
Angus Gardner (Australia)
Ben O'Keeffe (New Zealand)
Television match official:
Ben Skeen (New Zealand)

Preceded by 2015 Super Rugby Final	Super Rugby Final; 2016	Succeeded by 2017 Super Rugby Final
