= 2017 Super Rugby final =

Men's rugby union club competition

2017 Super Rugby Final
- Event: 2017 Super Rugby season
Lions	Crusaders
(South Africa)	(New Zealand)
17	25
- Date: 5 August 2017
- Venue: Ellis Park, Johannesburg
- Referee: Jaco Peyper (South Africa)
- Attendance: 62,000

The 2017 Super Rugby Final was played between the Lions and the Crusaders. The match, held at Ellis Park in Johannesburg was the 22nd final in the Super Rugby competition's history, and attracted a record crowd attendance of 62,000.

The Crusaders won the final, defeating the Lions by eight points, and stretched their record number of Super Rugby title wins to eight. A strong Crusaders defence, several errors committed by the Lions and a red card were the losers' downfall in the highly anticipated Super Rugby final held on South African soil for the first time since 2010.

Both finalists had won their respective conferences in the regular season. The Lions, as the top-placed team in 2017 season standings, played all their matches in the finals series at home in Johannesburg. They beat fellow South African side the Sharks in a closely matched quarterfinal, before defeating the previous year's champion the Hurricanes in their semifinal match.

The Crusaders had comfortably beat local New Zealand rivals the Highlanders and Chiefs in their respective quarterfinal and semifinal playoffs at home in Christchurch before travelling to Johannesburg for the final. It was their first Grand Final appearance since 2008.

== Road to the final ==
Finals Series qualifying teams
Conference leaders
Pos	Team	W	D	L	PD	BP	Pts
1	(South Africa) Lions	14	0	1	+322	9	65
2	(New Zealand) Crusaders	14	0	1	+241	7	63
3	(South Africa) Stormers	10	0	5	+54	3	43
4	(Australia) Brumbies	6	0	9	+36	10	34
Wildcard teams
5	(New Zealand) Hurricanes	12	0	3	+324	10	58
6	(New Zealand) Chiefs	12	1	2	+141	7	57
7	(New Zealand) Highlanders	11	0	4	+180	7	51
8	(South Africa) Sharks	9	1	5	+69	4	42
Source: SANZAAR

The 18 teams were split geographically into two groups with two conferences in each group. The Australasian Group included five teams in the Australian Conference and five teams in the New Zealand Conference. The South African Group, with six South African teams, one Argentinean team and one Japanese team was split into a four-team Africa 1 Conference and a four-team Africa 2 Conference.

The four conference winners qualified for the quarterfinals with a home ground advantage against four wildcard teams, made up of the third to fifth placed teams in the Australasian Group and the third placed team in the South African Group.

The quarterfinals featured away wins for the Hurricanes over the Brumbies, and Chiefs over the Stormers. The Crusaders beat Highlanders, keeping them scoreless, and the Lions beat the Sharks. For the semifinals, the Crusaders defeated the Chiefs in Christchurch and the Lions defeated the Hurricanes in Johannesburg.

The play-off fixtures were as follows:

Quarter-finals
22 July – Cape Town
(South Africa) Stormers	11
(New Zealand) Chiefs	17
22 July – Christchurch
(New Zealand) Crusaders	17
(New Zealand) Highlanders	0
22 July – Johannesburg
(South Africa) Lions	23
(South Africa) Sharks	21
21 July – Canberra
(Australia) Brumbies	16
(New Zealand) Hurricanes	35

Semi-finals
29 July – Christchurch
(New Zealand) Crusaders	27
(New Zealand) Chiefs	13
29 July – Johannesburg
(South Africa) Lions	44
(New Zealand) Hurricanes	29

Final
5 August – Johannesburg
(South Africa) Lions	17
(New Zealand) Crusaders	25

=== Quarter-finals ===
21 July 2017	Brumbies	16–35	Hurricanes	GIO Stadium, Canberra
19:35	Try: James Dargaville 3'; Josh Mann-Rea 16'; Con: Wharenui Hawera (0/2); Pen: Wharenui Hawera 11', 29' (2/3)		Try: Wes Goosen 7', 75'; Jordie Barrett 25'; TJ Perenara 69'; Con: Jordie Barrett 26', 70', 77' (3/4); Pen: Jordie Barrett 39', 48', 65' (3/3); Cards: Jeff Toomaga-Allen (yellow card) 41'

22 July 2017	Crusaders	17–0	Highlanders	AMI Stadium, Christchurch
19:35	Try: Joe Moody 32'; Codie Taylor 40'; Con: Richie Mo'unga 34', 41' (2/2); Pen: Richie Mo'unga 5' (1/4)		Cards: Liam Squire (yellow card) 5'

22 July 2017	Lions	23–21	Sharks	Ellis Park Stadium, Johannesburg
2:30	Try: Franco Mostert 47'; Jaco Kriel 51'; Lionel Mapoe 61'; Con: Elton Jantjies 61' (1/3); Pen: Elton Jantjies 10' (1/3); Cards: Franco Mostert (yellow card) 64'		Try: Kobus van Wyk 11'; Dan du Preez 66'; Con: Curwin Bosch 67' (1/2); Pen: Curwin Bosch 35', 39' (2/2); Drop: Curwin Bosch 17' (1/1); Cards: Stephan Lewies (yellow card) 45'

22 July 2017	Stormers	11–17	Chiefs	Newlands Stadium, Cape Town
17:00	Try: Siya Kolisi 45'; Con: SP Marais (0/1); Pen: SP Marais 23', 62' (2/3)		Try: Shaun Stevenson 75'; Con: Damian McKenzie (0/1); Pen: Damian McKenzie 29', 32', 38', 51' (4/4); Cards: Sam Cane (yellow card) 60'

=== Semi-finals ===
29 July 2017	Crusaders	27–13	Chiefs	AMI Stadium, Christchurch
19:35	Try: Bryn Hall 16'; Israel Dagg 49'; Seta Tamanivalu 58', 72'; Con: Richie Mo'unga 18', 59' (2/4); Pen: Richie Mo'unga 13' (1/1)		Try: Brodie Retallick 77'; Con: Damian McKenzie 78' (1/1); Pen: Damian McKenzie 26', 38' (2/2)

29 July 2017	Lions	44–29	Hurricanes	Ellis Park Stadium, Johannesburg
2:10	Try: Jacques van Rooyen 39'; Ross Cronjé 44'; Malcolm Marx 52'; Harold Vorster 61'; Elton Jantjies 69'; Kwagga Smith 74'; Con: Elton Jantjies 40', 45', 63', 69' (4/6); Pen: Elton Jantjies 5', 58' (2/2)		Try: TJ Perenara 7'; Wes Goosen 10'; Ardie Savea 30'; Ngani Laumape 55'; Con: Jordie Barrett 11', 57' (2/3); Beauden Barrett 31' (1/1); Pen: Jordie Barrett 19' (1/2); Cards: Beauden Barrett (yellow card) 58'

=== Final ===
==== Details ====
5 August 2017

Lions	17–25	Crusaders
Try: Malcolm Marx 64' Corné Fourie 72'; Con: Elton Jantjies 65', 73' (2/2); Pen: Elton Jantjies 26' (1/1)		Try: Seta Tamanivalu 7'; Jack Goodhue 11'; Kieran Read 43'; Con: Richie Mo'unga 8', 44' (2/3); Pen: Richie Mo'unga 41', 52' (2/2)

Ellis Park Stadium, Johannesburg
Referee: Jaco Peyper (South Africa)

Lions	Crusaders

Lions:
FB	15	Andries Coetzee
RW	14	Ruan Combrinck
OC	13	Lionel Mapoe
IC	12	Harold Vorster
LW	11	Courtnall Skosan
FH	10	Elton Jantjies
SH	9	Ross Cronjé
N8	8	Ruan Ackermann
OF	7	Kwagga Smith (red card) 38'
BF	6	Jaco Kriel
LL	5	Franco Mostert
RL	4	Andries Ferreira
TP	3	Ruan Dreyer
HK	2	Malcolm Marx
LP	1	Jacques van Rooyen
Substitutes:
HK	16	Akker van der Merwe
PR	17	Corné Fourie
PR	18	Johannes Jonker
LK	19	Lourens Erasmus
FL	20	Cyle Brink
SH	21	Faf de Klerk
IC	22	Rohan Janse van Rensburg
FB	23	Sylvian Mahuza
Coach:
(South Africa) Johan Ackermann

Crusaders:
FB	15	David Havili
RW	14	Israel Dagg
CE	13	Jack Goodhue
SF	12	Ryan Crotty
LW	11	Seta Tamanivalu
FH	10	Richie Mo'unga
SH	9	Bryn Hall
N8	8	Kieran Read
OF	7	Matt Todd
BF	6	Jordan Taufua
LL	5	Sam Whitelock
RL	4	Scott Barrett
TP	3	Owen Franks
HK	2	Codie Taylor
LP	1	Joe Moody
Substitutes:
HK	16	Ben Funnell
PR	17	Wyatt Crockett
PR	18	Michael Alaalatoa
LK	19	Luke Romano
FL	20	Pete Samu
SH	21	Mitchell Drummond
FH	22	Mitchell Hunt
WG	23	George Bridge
Coach:
(New Zealand) Scott Robertson

Man of the Match: Ryan Crotty

Assistant Referees:

Preceded by 2016 Super Rugby Final	Super Rugby Final; 2017	Succeeded by 2018 Super Rugby Final
