= 2018 Super Rugby final =

Men's rugby union club competition

2018 Super Rugby Final
- Event: 2018 Super Rugby season
Crusaders	Lions
(New Zealand)	(South Africa)
37	18
- Date: 4 August 2018
- Venue: Rugby League Park, Christchurch
- Referee: Angus Gardner (Australia)
- Attendance: c. 20,000

The 2018 Super Rugby Final was played between the Crusaders of New Zealand and the Lions of South Africa. The match, held at Rugby League Park in Christchurch, was the 23rd final in the Super Rugby competition's history.

Both finalists won their respective conferences during the regular season and both had hosted quarterfinal and semifinal matches in the playoff series. The final was hosted by the Crusaders as the higher placed team from the regular season standings.

The Crusaders won the match by a margin of 19 points. The Lions started the final well, however the combination of travel, jet-lag and the sheer dominance of the Crusaders was instrumental in securing the result. The Crusaders extended their record number of Super Rugby title wins to nine and became the first team to win back-to-back titles since the Chiefs in 2013.

== Road to the final ==
Finals Series qualifying teams
Conference leaders
Pos	Team	W	D	L	PD	BP	Pts
1	(New Zealand) Crusaders	14	0	2	+247	7	63
2	(South Africa) Lions	9	0	7	+84	10	46
3	(Australia) Waratahs	9	1	6	+112	6	44
Wildcard teams
4	(New Zealand) Hurricanes	11	0	5	+131	7	51
5	(New Zealand) Chiefs	11	0	5	+95	5	49
6	(New Zealand) Highlanders	10	0	6	−8	4	44
7	(Argentina) Jaguares	9	0	7	−9	2	38
8	(South Africa) Sharks	7	1	8	−5	6	36
Source: SANZAAR

After two seasons in which 18 teams participated, the 2018 season reverted to a 15-team competition, consisting of three geographical conferences.

Each conference leader at the end of the regular season, the Crusaders from New Zealand, Lions from South Africa and Waratahs from Australia gained home berths in the quarterfinals, as did the top-ranked wildcard team, the Hurricanes from New Zealand's conference. Their four wildcard opponents in the quarterfinals were the next best teams as ranked at the end of the regular season.

All four home teams won their quarterfinal matches to set up an all-New Zealand clash between the Crusaders and Hurricanes for the first semifinal in Christchurch, while the Lions hosted the Waratahs for the second semifinal in Johannesburg.

Both home teams won their semifinal matches with comfortable margins. The Lions then travelled away to Christchurch to play the Crusaders in the 2018 Super Rugby final.

Quarter-finals
21 July – Christchurch
(New Zealand) Crusaders	40
(South Africa) Sharks	10
21 July – Johannesburg
(South Africa) Lions	40
(Argentina) Jaguares	23

Semi-finals
28 July – Christchurch
(New Zealand) Crusaders	30
(New Zealand) Hurricanes	12
28 July – Johannesburg
(South Africa) Lions	44
(Australia) Waratahs	26

== Match ==
=== Details ===
4 August 2018
19:35

Crusaders	37–18	Lions
Try: Tamanivalu 19'; Havili 34'; Drummond 62'; S. Barrett 70'; Con: Mo'unga (4) 20', 36', 63', 71'; Pen: Mo'unga (3) 16', 33', 43'	Report; Scoreboard	Try: Brink 53'; Marx 68'; Con: Jantjies 54'; Pen: Jantjies (2) 13', 39'

Rugby League Park, Christchurch
Referee: Angus Gardner (Australia)

Crusaders	Lions

FB	15	David Havili
RW	14	Seta Tamanivalu
OC	13	Jack Goodhue
IC	12	Ryan Crotty	(yellow card) 67'
LW	11	George Bridge		(substituted off) 77'
FH	10	Richie Mo'unga		(substituted off) 77'
SH	9	Bryn Hall		(substituted off) 54'
N8	8	Kieran Read
OF	7	Matt Todd
BF	6	Heiden Bedwell-Curtis		(substituted off) 56'
RL	5	Sam Whitelock (c)
LL	4	Scott Barrett		(substituted off) 72'
TP	3	Owen Franks		(substituted off) 60'
HK	2	Codie Taylor		(substituted off) 69'
LP	1	Joe Moody		(substituted off) 47'
Substitutes:
HK	16	Andrew Makalio		(substituted on) 69'
PR	17	Tim Perry		(substituted on) 47'
PR	18	Michael Alaalatoa		(substituted on) 60'
LK	19	Luke Romano		(substituted on) 72'
FL	20	Pete Samu		(substituted on) 56'
SH	21	Mitchell Drummond		(substituted on) 54'
CE	22	Mitchell Hunt		(substituted on) 77'
FB	23	Braydon Ennor		(substituted on) 77'
Coach:
(New Zealand) Scott Robertson

FB	15	Andries Coetzee
RW	14	Ruan Combrinck
OC	13	Lionel Mapoe
IC	12	Harold Vorster	(substituted off) 76'
LW	11	Courtnall Skosan
FH	10	Elton Jantjies	(substituted off) 54'
SH	9	Ross Cronjé	(substituted off) 69'
N8	8	Warren Whiteley (c)
BF	7	Cyle Brink	(substituted off) 63'
OF	6	Kwagga Smith
RL	5	Franco Mostert
LL	4	Marvin Orie	(substituted off) 54'
TP	3	Ruan Dreyer	(substituted off) 69'
HK	2	Malcolm Marx	(substituted off) 76'
LP	1	Jacques van Rooyen	(substituted off) 47'
Substitutes:
HK	16	Corné Fourie	(substituted on) 76'
PR	17	Dylan Smith	(substituted on) 47'
PR	18	Johannes Jonker	(substituted on) 69'
LK	19	Lourens Erasmus	(substituted on) 54'
FL	20	Marnus Schoeman	(substituted on) 63'
SH	21	Dillon Smit	(substituted on) 69'
FH	22	Aphiwe Dyantyi	(substituted on) 54'
WG	23	Howard Mnisi	(substituted on) 76'
Coach:
(South Africa) Swys de Bruin

Man of the Match:
Richie Mo'unga

Assistant referees:
Glen Jackson (New Zealand)
Nic Berry (Australia)
Television match official:
Shane McDermott (New Zealand)
