= Chris Boyd (rugby union) =

- Born: 21 July 1958 (age 68) Wellington, New Zealand
- Occupation(s): Performance Consultant, Rugby Union Coach

Rugby union career
Coaching career
- Years: Team
- 2003–06: Wellington (assistant)
- 2006–08: Sharks (assistant)
- 2011: Tonga (assistant)
- 2011–14: Wellington
- 2012–14: New Zealand under-20
- 2015–2018: Hurricanes
- 2018–2022: Northampton Saints (Director of Rugby)
- 2024–: Munster (Performance Consultant)
- Correct as of 3 December 2024

Chris Boyd (born 21 July 1958) is a New Zealand rugby union coach, currently working as a Performance Consultant for Munster. He has previously coached at Wellington, the New Zealand under-20 National Team, English Premiership team Northampton Saints, and Super Rugby franchise the Hurricanes.

== Coaching career ==
Boyd's first coaching role was as coach of Tawa Rugby Club, where he spent nine years from 1989 to 1998. In that year he took over as Wellington's second XV coach, becoming assistant coach to the provincial side, the Wellington Lions, in 2003. From 2006 to 2008 he was assistant coach at the Sharks Super Rugby franchise. He then worked at the International Rugby Academy of New Zealand as a coaching services advisor, and was defensive coach for the Tongan team at the 2011 Rugby World Cup, with Tonga famously defeating eventual finalists France 14–19 in the pool stages.

=== Wellington Lions ===
Boyd was appointed as Wellington Lions coach in 2011, and took over as head coach of the national under-20 team in 2012, a position he vacated until 2014. During his tenure as Wellington head coach, he steered his team to the 2013 ITM Cup final, losing out 29–13 to Canterbury, with the victors in turn securing their sixth ITM Cup in a row.

=== Hurricanes ===
In the 2015 season Boyd became the head coach of the Hurricanes Super Rugby franchise along with John Plumtree as assistant coach. On 4 July 2015, Boyd guided his Hurricanes side all the way to the Super Rugby final, losing out 21–14 to eventual winners and fellow New Zealand franchise, Highlanders. The following season he would go one step further and win the 2016 Super Rugby final, defeating the Lions 20–3 on 6 August 2016. Upon leaving the Hurricanes, Boyd had become the most successful coach in the franchise's history to date, winning the Super Rugby New Zealand Conference twice, whilst also winning the competition in its entirety in 2016, having finished runner-up the year before.

=== Northampton Saints ===
On 29 January 2018, it was announced that Boyd would become Director of Rugby at Northampton Saints as of August 2018. Boyd's inaugural season at the club resulted in his first piece of silverware on 17 March 2019, by defeating Saracens 23–9 in the Premiership Rugby Cup final, in front of a full-house Franklin's Gardens Stadium. On 18 May 2019, it was confirmed that Boyd's Northampton Saints finished in the all-important 4th place, and would go on to face the Exeter Chiefs in the Premiership Rugby play-off system. However, they were defeated 42–12 by the Exeter Chiefs at Sandy Park. He left Northampton following the conclusion of the 2021–22 season.

=== Munster ===
On 3 December 2024, he was appointed as a Performance Consultant supporting interim head coach Ian Costello at Munster.

== Coaching style ==
Boyd is renowned for his sides playing an attacking brand of rugby, proven statistically by his Hurricanes scoring 97 tries across the 2017 Super Rugby season. Throughout the course of the 2018–19 Premiership Rugby season, his Northampton Saints side steadily progressed, most notably with improvements in the offloading and player support game. It is also recorded that he has remarkable communication with his players.

== Honours ==
=== As a coach ===
Wellington

- ITM Cup runner-up: 2013

Hurricanes

- New Zealand Conference Champions: 2015, 2016
- Super Rugby Championship Runner-up: 2015
- Super Rugby Championship: 2016

Northampton Saints

- Premiership Rugby Cup: 2018–19
