= Thando Biyela =

- Born: Thandolwethu Biyela; 4 June 2004 (age 22)
- Height: 1.87 m (6 ft 1 1/2 in)
- Weight: 93 kg (14.6 st; 205 lb)
- School: KES

Rugby union career
- Position(s): Flanker, eighthman
- Current team: Golden Lions
Senior career
Years	Team	Apps	(Points)
2025-	Golden Lions	8	(5)
International career
Years	Team	Apps	(Points)
2025	South Africa U20	6	(5)
Medal record
Men's rugby union
Representing South Africa
World Rugby U20 Championship
Gold medal – first place	2025 Italy	Squad

Thandolwethu Biyela (born 4 June 2004) is a South African rugby union player for the Golden Lions in the Currie Cup. He was a part of the South Africa U20 team that won the 2025 World Rugby U20 championship. He mainly plays as a blindside flanker, but can also play as an eighthman.

== Club career ==
=== Golden Lions ===
Biyela came up through the Golden Lions youth system, playing for them at Craven Week in 2023. In July 2025 he was named for the Currie Cup squad for the 2025 Currie Cup Premier Division season.

== International career ==
=== South Africa under-20s ===
Biyela made his debut for the under-20s in a friendly against Georgia in February 2025. In that years U20 Rugby Championship he would play every game for the Boks in a team that underperformed in that tournament, losing their games to Australia and New Zealand, 29-24 and 48-45 respectively. He would only play one game in the 2025 World Rugby U20 championship, captaining the team in a 73–14 win over Scotland.
