= Angus Gardner =

Australian rugby union referee (born 1984)

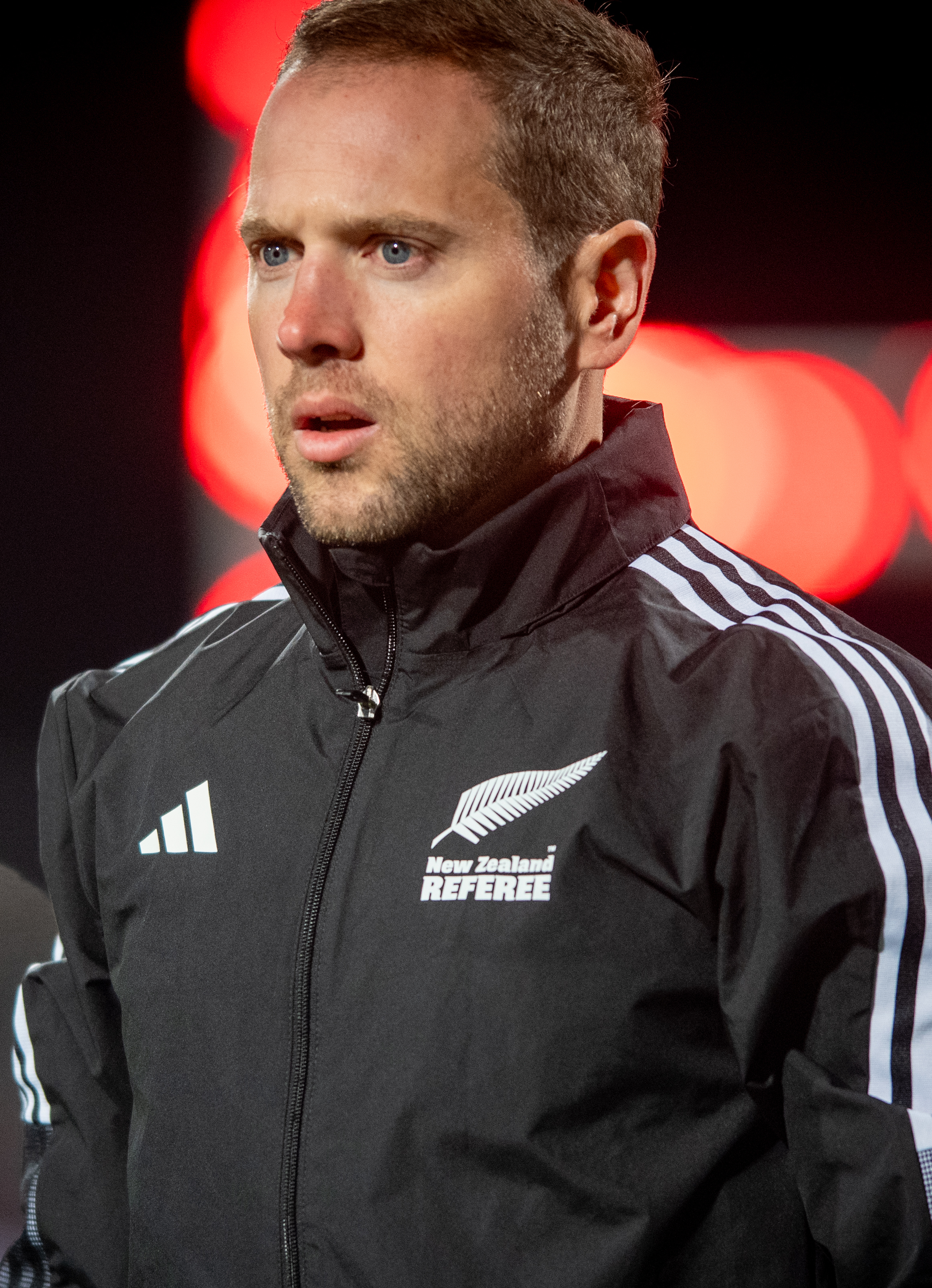
- Gardner in 2025
- Born: Angus Ross Gardner; 24 August 1984 (age 42) Sydney, New South Wales, Australia
- School: Sydney Church of England Grammar School
- University: University of Technology Sydney

Rugby union career
Refereeing career
Years	Competition	Apps
2011–	Test matches	50
2012; 2014	IRB Junior World Championship	2
2012–	Super Rugby	119
2015–2023	Rugby World Cup	3 (tournaments)
- Correct as of 22 June 2025

Angus Gardner (born 24 August 1984) is a professional Australian rugby union referee who was appointed to the Super Rugby referees panel in 2012. His first match in Super Rugby was between the Queensland Reds and Melbourne Rebels at Lang Park, Brisbane in March of that year.

== Career ==
Gardner took up refereeing in 1999 at the age of fifteen, and became a full-time referee in 2015. He was appointed to his first Test match in November 2011, which was an Oceania Cup match between Papua New Guinea and Vanuatu in Port Morseby.

Gardner was appointed to the IRB Junior World Championship in 2012 and 2014, and took charge of the semi-final between England and Ireland in 2014.

In 2015, Gardner was selected as an assistant referee at the 2015 Rugby World Cup.

He refereed the 2018 Super Rugby final between the Crusaders and the Lions in Christchurch.

In 2019, Gardner was selected to referee at the 2019 Rugby World Cup.

In 2025, Gardner was appointed the 2025 Super Rugby Pacific final between the Crusaders and the Chiefs in Christchurch.

=== 2026 Nations Championship ===
In June 2026, ahead of the first set of matches in the inaugural 2026 Nations Championship, Gardner was appointed the referee the Argentina–England Test match in the final round of the Southern Hemisphere Series. During the match, Gardner, who gave out seven yellow cards (a record for a Test match in rugby), attracted criticism for his inability to assert control over proceedings, with several of his decisions coming under scrutiny. Primary among them was a yellow card shown to England's Ollie Chessum following an altercation with an Argentine player, despite the offending player being Tommy Freeman. Following the final whistle, which came shortly after Gardner and the Television Match Official (TMO) had ruled out a late Argentine try that would have afforded Argentina the opportunity to draw the match with a successful conversion, Gardner was touched on the arm by an Argentine player. Physical contact with match officials is prohibited under World Rugby Law 9.28, which provides that: "Players must not make physical contact with match officials and any incidents can be referred to the disciplinary process." While leaving the field, Gardner was also hurled verbal abuse from the crowd and had an object thrown at him. Former rugby player and commentator Brian Moore, writing in the The Daily Telegraph, said: "World Rugby has a duty to fully investigate these reports and, if there is any truth to them, sanction Argentina in a meaningful way."

== Honours ==
- World Rugby Referee of the Year: 2018
