= Ruan Delport =

South African rugby union player

- Born: 3 July 2002 (age 24) South Africa
- Height: 199 cm (6 ft 6 in)
- Weight: 112 kg (247 lb; 17 st 9 lb)
- School: Hoërskool Garsfontein

Rugby union career
- Position: Lock / Flanker
- Current team: Lions / Golden Lions
Senior career
Years	Team	Apps	(Points)
2022	Blue Bulls	2	(0)
2022–	Lions	49	(0)
2023–	Golden Lions	11	(5)
- Correct as of 3 November 2026

Ruan Delport (born 3 July 2002) is a South African rugby union player, who plays for the Lions and Golden Lions. His preferred position is lock or Flanker.

== Early career ==
Delport attended Hoërskool Garsfontein where he was nominated for School forward of the year in 2020, and earned selection for the Bulls U21 squad in 2021. He also played for the Bulls in the SA Rugby U20 Championship in 2021.

== Professional career ==
Delport made his professional debut for the Blue Bulls in the 2022 Currie Cup Premier Division. he transferred to the Lions following the completion of the Currie Cup, making his debut for the side in February 2023. He has gone on to make over 30 appearances for the Lions, while also representing the Golden Lions in the Currie Cup.
