= Richie Mo'unga =

New Zealand rugby union player (born 1994)

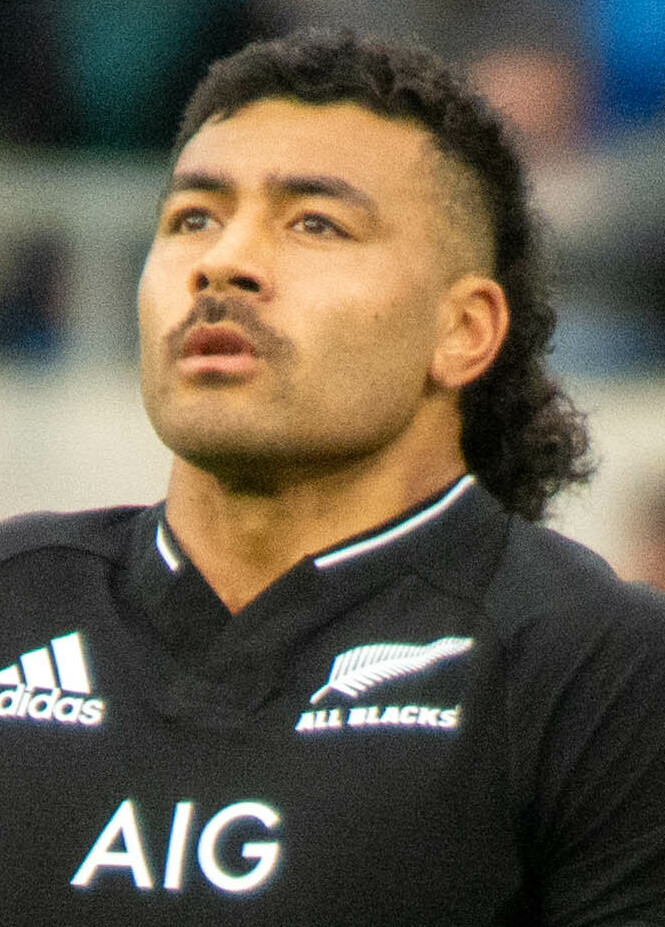
- Mo'unga representing New Zealand during the 2021 end-of-year rugby union internationals
- Full name: Richard Mo'unga
- Born: 25 May 1994 (age 32) Christchurch, New Zealand
- Height: 1.76 m (5 ft 9 in)
- Weight: 85 kg (187 lb; 13 st 5 lb)
- School: St. Andrew's College

Rugby union career
- Position(s): First five-eighth, Fullback
- Current team: Crusaders, Canterbury
Senior career
Years	Team	Apps	(Points)
2013–2023 2026–	Canterbury	54	(361)
2016–2023 2027–	Crusaders	109	(1230)
2024–2026	Toshiba Brave Lupus	51	(414)
- Correct as of 9 August 2026
International career
Years	Team	Apps	(Points)
2014	New Zealand U20	5	(29)
2017–2023 2026–	New Zealand	59	(464)
- Correct as of 21 November 2026
Medal record
Men's Rugby union
Representing New Zealand
Rugby World Cup
Bronze medal – third place	2019 Japan	Squad
Silver medal – second place	2023 France	Squad

Richie Mo'unga (born 25 May 1994) is a New Zealand professional rugby union player who plays as a first five-eighth for the Crusaders in Super Rugby, Canterbury in the National Provincial Championship, and the New Zealand national team.

== Early life ==
Mo'unga was born in Christchurch, to a Tongan-born father and a Samoan-born mother. He was initially educated at Riccarton High School in his hometown before being offered a scholarship at St. Andrew's College where he played U15 in 2009 then 1st XV rugby for 3 years and captained them in his senior year (2012). After graduating college, he began playing for Linwood in the local Canterbury senior club rugby competition while at the same time being a member of the Canterbury Academy.

== Club career ==
He was not named as a full member of Canterbury's squad for the 2013 ITM Cup, but in what was just his first year out of school, he was called up to cover injuries and All Black absences and went on to make 8 appearances during the campaign which finished with Canterbury defeating Wellington in the Premiership final. He was upgraded to a full squad member in 2014 and played in 10 matches, featuring both at first five-eighth and fullback as Canterbury fell in the tournament's semifinal stage.

He again made 10 appearances as Canterbury regained their ITM Cup Premiership title in 2015 with a 50–20 win over Springboks in the final.

As a result of his excellent domestic showings for Canterbury, Mo'unga was named in the Crusaders Wider Training Group for the 2015 Super Rugby season. However, due to the presence of the likes of Dan Carter, Colin Slade and Tom Taylor in the Crusaders backline, he did not get any game time in his first season at Super Rugby level.

Nonetheless, the departures of all three players ahead of the 2016 season saw Mo'unga promoted to the full Crusaders squad. He made his debut on 27 February 2016 in a match at home to the Chiefs and went on to start all 16 matches during a season which ended with Crusaders losing 42–25 to the Lions in Johannesburg in the quarterfinals.

The 2016 Mitre 10 Cup saw him firmly established in the number 10 jersey for Canterbury, as they went on to be crowned New Zealand champions for the 8th time in 9 years.

Mo'unga started in all of his 13 games in the 2017 season for the Crusaders. Mo'unga scored 10 points in the 2017 Super Rugby Final in Johannesburg, South Africa against the Lions, leading the Crusaders to a 25–17 win and their 8th Super Rugby title.

Mo'unga finished the 2017 Mitre 10 Cup season as the leading point scorer in the competition, scoring 160 points in just 10 games for Canterbury. In the final against Tasman, Mo'unga broke the record for the most points scored in a final when he scored 25 points (2 tries, 3 conversions and 3 penalties). He was named Man of the Match.

In 2018, Mo'unga started in 12 games for the Crusaders. This included a Man of the Match performance in the Super Rugby Final played in Christchurch, New Zealand where he scored 17 points to lead the Crusaders to their second consecutive title.

Mo'unga had a poor start to the 2019 Super Rugby season, beginning the season with a low kicking percentage. Despite his poor start to the season, Mo'unga eventually kicked on, finishing the Crusaders "three peat" season as one of the competition's highest points scorers, second only to Handré Pollard from the Bulls. Mo'unga scored 20 points in the semifinal, as well as 14 points in the final, which was a win over the Jaguares.

On the 5 November, Mo'unga played for the South Island in the 2020 North vs South rugby union match.

Since the start of 2020, Mo'unga has become one of the first five-eighth in New Zealand with performances during Super Rugby, leading the Crusaders to Super Rugby Aotearoa titles in both 2020 and 2021, and again in the 2022 and 2023 Super Rugby Pacific seasons with the side winning seven years in a row.

== International career ==
Mo'unga was a member of the New Zealand Under 20 side, which finished 3rd in the 2014 IRB Junior World Championship in New Zealand, where he scored 29 points in 5 games.

Mo'unga represented the Barbarians against New Zealand, on 4 November 2017, at Twickenham Stadium, London. Mo'unga scored 7 points, scoring the game's opening try and also converting a Barbarian try in the 31st minute.

After the Barbarians match, Mo'unga joined the All Blacks for their Northern Tour, having warranted a place in the squad through his performance in the Mitre 10 Cup. Mo'unga was named on the bench for a New Zealand side for a midweek game against a French side. He converted a try by lock Patrick Tuipulotu after coming on as a replacement in the second half. This match however did not count as an official test match.

Mo'unga made his official test debut on 23 June 2018 against France during the France test series where he replaced Damian McKenzie in the 69th minute. The All Blacks won 49–14. Mo'unga made his first ever start for New Zealand during Round 3 of The Rugby Championship, on 8 September 2018. Mo'unga led the All Blacks to a 46–24 victory over Argentina by scoring 16 of the team's points. Mo'unga only missed one kick on the night and lasted the full 80 minutes.

Mo'unga's starting performance against Argentina saw him temporarily overtake Damian McKenzie, as backup to regular starter Beauden Barrett. This saw Mo'unga feature off the bench against Argentina and South Africa in the final two rounds of the competition. Mo'unga replaced winger Waisake Naholo, in the 51st minute against South Africa, with Ben Smith moved to wing, and Beauden Barrett moved into fullback, to accommodate for Mo'unga at first-five. Mo'unga took kicking duties off Barrett, who had missed a drop goal during the match. Mo'unga converted Ardie Savea's last minute try, after the 80th minute, winning the game for the All Blacks, making the final result against South Africa 32-30. Mo'unga finished as one of the highest points scorers of the Rugby Championship, with 24 points. This ranked Mo'unga 6th of all the points scorers.

Mo'unga remained unable to become a regular starter for New Zealand on the 2018 end of year tour. After replacing McKenzie in the third Bledisloe Cup test, against Australia, in a 37–20 win, Mo'unga earned a start against Japan on 3 November. Mo'unga scored 22 points during New Zealand's 69–31 win over Japan, including his first international try. Mo'unga stayed on for the full 80 minutes, with debutant first-five, Brett Cameron, instead replacing Waisake Naholo, although Utility Back, Jordie Barrett, did kick some goals towards the end of the test against Japan, in which Mo'unga was one of the best performers.

He made an appearance in every test on the end of year tour, coming off the bench in the final three, which were wins against England and Italy, as well as a 9–16 loss to Ireland.

Named in the All Blacks squad for the 2019 Rugby Championship, Mo'unga was named at first-five-eighth after starting fullback Damian McKenzie was ruled out of the tournament with an ACL injury. The All Blacks starting five-eighth, Beauden Barrett was shifted to fullback, as part of a continuation of the dual playmaker system, while Waisake Naholo was dropped from the national setup entirely to make room for Mo'unga and Barrett's combination. After New Zealand's 16–16 draw with South Africa and record 26–47 loss to Australia the Mo'unga and Barrett combination was criticised in New Zealand widely. With many fans and media alike both favouring the experience of veteran Ben Smith at fullback, and 2 time player of the year, Beauden Barrett, at first five-eighth. However, Mo'unga grabbed a 14-point haul against Australia in the second Bledisloe Cup test against Australia for the year, before being replaced by Jordie Barrett. The 36–0 win over Australia saw Mo'unga sustain a shoulder injury, which ruled him out for one test, against Tonga.

On 28 August 2019, All Blacks head coach Steve Hansen named Mo'unga as one of 31 players selected in New Zealand's squad for the 2019 Rugby World Cup. Mo'unga was named as the only specialist first five-eighth in the squad, with the injured Damian McKenzie, as well as single cap All Blacks Brett Cameron and Josh Ioane missing out. Mo'unga started at first five-eighth throughout the tournament, winning the man of the match award against Canada. After a solid display against Ireland in the quarter-finals, Mo'unga and the All Blacks were knocked out of the 2019 Rugby World Cup at the semi-finals against England, losing 19-7. Mo'unga was retained at first-five for the third place play off, where he led them to a 40–17 victory over Wales.

== Personal life ==
In 2019, Mo'unga and his partner, Sophie Vieceli, announced their engagement on social media. He is the uncle of Fijian first five-eighth Isaiah Armstrong-Ravula.

== Honours ==
New Zealand

- Rugby World Cup / Webb Ellis Cup
  - Third-place: 2019
  - Runner-up: 2023
- The Rugby Championship
  - Champions: 2018, 2020, 2021, 2022, 2023
- Bledisloe Cup
  - Winners: 2019, 2020, 2021, 2022, 2023

Crusaders

- Super Rugby champions: 2017, 2018, 2019, 2022, 2023
- Super Rugby Aotearoa champions: 2020, 2021

Canterbury

- National Provincial Championship Winners: 2013, 2015, 2016, 2017, 2026
- Ranfurly Shield: 2016, 2026

Toshiba Brave Lupus

- Japan Rugby League One – Division 1: 2023–2024, 2024–2025
