= Dylan Smith (rugby union) =

South African rugby union player (born 1994)

- Full name: Dylan Thomas Smith
- Born: 26 February 1994 (age 32) Durban, South Africa
- Height: 1.825 m (6 ft 0 in)
- Weight: 113 kg (17 st 11 lb; 249 lb)
- School: King Edward VII School, Johannesburg

Rugby union career
- Position: Prop
- Current team: Bulls / Blue Bulls
Youth career
- 2011–2015: Golden Lions
Senior career
Years	Team	Apps	(Points)
2014–2016	Golden Lions XV	18	(0)
2015–2021	Golden Lions	22	(5)
2016–2020	Lions	55	(10)
2021	Stade Français	1	(0)
2021–2022	Ealing Trailfinders	15	(0)
2022–	Bulls	3	(0)
2022–	Blue Bulls	3	(0)
- Correct as of 23 July 2022
International career
Years	Team	Apps	(Points)
2012	South Africa Schools	0	(0)
- Correct as of 21 May 2018

Dylan Thomas Smith (born 26 February 1994) in Durban, is a South African professional rugby union player for the Bulls in the United Rugby Championship and the Blue Bulls in the Currie Cup His regular position is loosehead prop.

== Career ==
He first earned a provincial call-up when he was selected to represent the Golden Lions at the 2011 Under-18 Craven Week, the premier high school rugby union tournament in South Africa, when still at Under-17 level. He was once again selected in the squad for the 2012 tournament, held in Port Elizabeth, and also called up into the South Africa Schools squad, although he failed to make any appearances for them.

After finishing school, he joined the Golden Lions Academy and he was the first-choice loosehead prop for the Golden Lions U19 team that participated in the 2013 Under-19 Provincial Championship Group A. Smith played in eleven of their twelve matches during the pool stages as they finished in second spot on the log. He started their 27–25 semi-final victory over Sharks U19 and also started the final, where their trans-Jukskei rivals, Blue Bulls U19 ran out 35–23 winners.

At the start of 2014, he was included in the Golden Lions squad for the 2014 Vodacom Cup. He made his first class debut by playing off the bench in their Round Two match against the Falcons, with the Golden Lions winning that match 23–22. Two more substitute appearances followed against the Blue Bulls and Griquas before he started his first senior match, a 110–0 demolition of the Limpopo Blue Bulls in Polokwane. One more substitute appearance followed in their final group match against the Pumas, which resulted in the Golden Lions finishing in fourth spot to qualify for the quarter finals. Smith started the 27–20 quarter final victory over the Sharks XV in Durban, the 16–15 semi-final win against Gauteng rivals the Blue Bulls and also started the final, where the Golden Lions could not prevent Griquas winning the match 30–6 to win the competition for the fifth time.

Smith started ten matches for the Golden Lions U21 in the 2014 Under-21 Provincial Championship. He scored tries for them in their matches against Border U21 and Western Province U21 to help them finish third. However, Smith ended on the losing side against the Blue Bulls U21, going down 19–23 in the semi-final.

He was the first-choice loosehead prop for the Golden Lions during the 2015 Vodacom Cup competition.

On 16 March 2021, Smith moves to France to join Stade Français Paris as a medical joker in the Top 14 for the 2020–21 season.

== Honours ==
- Super Rugby runner up (2) 2016, 2018
- RFU Championship champion 2021-22
