= Cyle Brink =

South African rugby union player

- Full name: Cyle Justin Brink
- Born: 16 January 1994 (age 32) Johannesburg, South Africa
- Height: 1.91 m (6 ft 3 in)
- Weight: 113 kg (17 st 11 lb; 249 lb)
- School: King Edward VII School, Johannesburg

Rugby union career
- Position: Flanker
- Current team: Bulls / Blue Bulls
Youth career
- 2012–2015: Golden Lions
Senior career
Years	Team	Apps	(Points)
2014–2018	Golden Lions XV	20	(25)
2016–2020	Lions	45	(25)
2016–2019	Golden Lions	22	(20)
2020–2021	Leicester Tigers	19	(10)
2022–	Bulls	7	(15)
2022–	Blue Bulls	3	(10)
- Correct as of 23 July 2022
International career
Years	Team	Apps	(Points)
2014	South Africa Under-20	5	(0)
- Correct as of 21 May 2018

Cyle Justin Brink (born 16 January 1994) is a South African rugby union player for Bulls in the United Rugby Championship and the Blue Bulls in the Currie Cup. His regular position is flanker.

== Career ==
=== Youth ===
While at school at King Edward VII School, Brink was called up to the Golden Lions side for the 2012 Under-18 Craven Week tournament. The following year, he played in ten matches for the Golden Lions U19 side during the 2013 Under-19 Provincial Championship competition. During September, he was also drafted into the Golden Lions U21 side, making four starts for that side during the 2013 Under-21 Provincial Championship.

In 2014, Brink was included in the South Africa Under-20 squad for the 2014 IRB Junior World Championship to be held in New Zealand.

=== Golden Lions ===
Brink made his first class debut for the Golden Lions during the 2014 Vodacom Cup competition. He started in their opening day match against the Leopards in Potchefstroom, helping them to an 18–16 victory. Two weeks later, in his second match for the Golden Lions, he scored his first senior try against neighbours Blue Bulls, but it was not enough to prevent them falling to a 22–20 defeat. He also scored two tries in their match against the whipping boys of the competition, the Limpopo Blue Bulls, getting a try in each half to help the team to a 110–0 win. He made a total of eight starts during the competition – starting all of them and scoring three tries.

=== Lions ===
Brink made his debut for the Lions team against the Cheetahs.

=== Leicester Tigers ===
On 10 March 2020, Brink would travel to England to sign for Leicester Tigers in the Gallagher Premiership on an undisclosed deal from the 2020–21 season.

=== Bulls ===
On 20 December 2021 it was announced that Brink would leave Leicester on 31 December 2021 to join the Bulls in the United Rugby Championship.

== Honours ==
- IRB Junior World Championship runner up 2014
- Super Rugby runner up (3) 2016, 2017, 2018
- Currie Cup runner up 2019
- European Rugby Challenge Cup runner up 2020-21
