= Malcolm Marx =

South African rugby union player (born 1994)

Malcom Marx
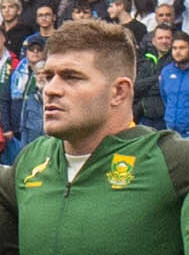
- Marx in 2022
- Full name: Malcolm Justin Marx
- Born: 13 July 1994 (age 32) Germiston, Gauteng, South Africa
- Height: 1.89 m (6 ft 2 1/2 in)
- Weight: 116 kg (18 st 4 lb; 256 lb)
- School: King Edward VII School
- University: University of Johannesburg

Rugby union career
- Position: Hooker
- Current team: Vodacom Bulls
Youth career
- 2007–2015: Golden Lions
Amateur team(s)
Years	Team	Apps	(Points)
2013	UJ	8	(20)
Senior career
Years	Team	Apps	(Points)
2014–2018	Golden Lions XV	13	(10)
2014–2017	Golden Lions	17	(5)
2014–2019	Lions	68	(150)
2020	NTT Shining Arcs	6	(25)
2021–2027	Kubota Spears	68	(205)
2027–	Bulls		
- Correct as of 31 May 2026
International career
Years	Team	Apps	(Points)
2012	South Africa Schools	2	(0)
2014	South Africa U20	1	(5)
2016	South Africa A	2	(0)
2016–	South Africa	96	(160)
- Correct as of 27 September 2026
Medal record
Men's Rugby union
Representing South Africa
Rugby World Cup
Gold medal – first place	2019 Japan	Squad
Gold medal – first place	2023 France	Squad

Malcolm Justin Marx (born 13 July 1994) is a South African professional rugby union player who currently plays for the South Africa national rugby team and Kubota Spears in the Japan Rugby League One. His regular position is hooker, but he did play as a flanker at youth level for the Golden Lions. He is widely regarded as the best hooker in World Rugby and possibly one of the greatest hookers of all time and was awarded the 2025 World Rugby Men's 15s Player of the Year.

== Youth career ==
Marx represented the Golden Lions at several youth tournaments. He played for them at the 2007 Under-13 Craven Week competition and the 2010 Under-16 Grant Khomo Week competition.

During his schooling, Marx attended King Edward VII School in Johannesburg. Marx was included in a South Africa Academy side in 2011 and, following the 2012 Under-18 Craven Week competition, he was named in the South Africa Schools side and played against France and England in August 2012.

In 2013, Marx played for UJ in the 2013 Varsity Cup competition, making eight appearances and scoring four tries.

Marx was also a regular for the Golden Lions U19 side during the 2013 Under-19 Provincial Championship competition. He made thirteen appearances in total, scoring four tries – one of them in the final against the Blue Bulls U19. He was also named as the Golden Lions U19 Forward of the Year for his displays.

Marx was included in the South Africa Under-20 side for the 2014 IRB Junior World Championship.

== Career ==
=== Lions ===
Marx made his senior debut for the Golden Lions in the 2014 Vodacom Cup by starting in their 18–16 opening day victory over the Leopards in Potchefstroom.

Marx was also included in the Lions Super Rugby squad for the 2014 Super Rugby season.

After a stellar 2017 for the Lions, Marx picked up a number of awards for the Lions including Super Rugby Player of the Year, Supporters Player of the Year, Players Player of the Year and Most Valued Player of the Year. Marx continued this form into the 2018 Super Rugby season, finishing the competition as the Lions' top try-scorer of the year and he is now the joint top try scorer (27) in Lions history, a record he shares with current team mates Courtnall Skosan and Lionel Mapoe.

=== Japan ===
In June 2019, Japanese Top League team NTT Shining Arcs announced the signing of Marx for the 2020 season. Marx joined the team following the 2019 Rugby World Cup, although only played six games for the club before the season was cancelled due to the COVID-19 pandemic in Japan.

In August 2020, Marx transferred to another Japanese club, signing for the Kubota Spears in the Top League (later renamed the Japan Rugby League One). Being a Test-capped South African international, Marx came under the competitions Category C player quota policy.

Marx played nine games for the Spears in the restructured 2021 season, scoring eight tries and being selected in the league's best XV team at the season awards. He played just five games in the following season, scoring seven tries, including a hat-trick in the fourth round. Throughout the year he was heavily linked to the Stormers in United Rugby Championship (URC).

In 2022–23, Marx won his first Japan Rugby League One title with the Spears. He scored 11 tries across 16 games as the teams scrum was credited in playing a pivotal role to their success. Marx was later named in the league's best XV award for a second time.

Due to an injury sustained while training with the Springboks, Marx missed the 2023–24 season. Between 2024 and 2026, Marx played 37 games for the Spears which saw them finish runner-up in consecutive years. In both seasons, Marx was announced as the competitions best hooker, being named in the league's best XV awards, and four times overall.

In October 2026, ahead of the 2026–27 Japan Rugby League One season, Marx announced that he would be returning to South Africa at the conclusion of the season.

== International career ==
=== South Africa A ===
In 2016, Marx was included in a South Africa 'A' squad that played a two-match series against a touring England Saxons team. He came on as a replacement in their first match in Bloemfontein, but ended on the losing side as the visitors ran out 32–24 winners. He then started the second match of the series, a 26–29 defeat to the Saxons in George.

=== Springboks ===
==== 2016–2017 ====
Marx was first selected for the Springboks for the 2016 Rugby Championship, making three appearances for his country during 2016. Marx made his debut for the Springboks on 17 September 2016, the same date as team mate Francois Louw's 50th test. Marx replaced Springbok captain Adriaan Strauss in the 43rd minute, but had a disappointing debut, with South Africa losing to New Zealand 13-41. Marx earned his first start for the Springboks on 5 November 2016, putting a 51-minute performance into a 31-31 draw against the Barbarians in an uncapped match, prior to being replaced by Bongi Mbonambi.

After a series of outstanding performances for the Lions, Marx became a regular starter for South Africa in 2017. On 10 June 2017, he was named man of the match for his performance in the first of three tests against the French. Although his performance against New Zealand in the third round of the 2017 Rugby Championship was highly criticised, Marx performed to a world-class level throughout most of the competition and played in every test of the competition, with South Africa finishing in third place. Marx was not subbed off in either test against Australia during the competition, a rare feat for a hooker, the first test of which a 23-23 draw and the second test against Australia being a 27-27 draw. Marx lost out on winning Man of the Match to Australian back Kurtley Beale on both occasions.

Marx took his international career to new heights on 7 October 2017, with his performance against New Zealand becoming much-talked about and publicised, arguably his best individual performance to date. The performances of Marx, as well as fellow forwards Steven Kitshoff and newly-appointed Springbok Captain Eben Etzebeth allowed South Africa to compete well against the All Blacks, with Marx making four turnovers and many tackles on defence, also setting up replacement loose forward Jean-Luc du Preez for a try and scoring the final try of the game. Marx's try was converted by Lions teammate Elton Jantjies to make the final score a narrow 24-25 loss to the All Blacks. Marx completed his 2017 rugby season by appearing in three of the four Springbok tests during the 2017 end-of-year rugby union internationals.

In 2017 Marx scooped a number of awards, he was voted SA Rugby Player of the Year and SA Rugby Young Player of the Year. He was also voted South African Super Rugby Player of the Tournament.

==== 2019 Rugby World Cup ====
Marx was named in South Africa's squad for the 2019 Rugby World Cup. South Africa went on to win the tournament, defeating England in the final.

==== 2023 Rugby World Cup ====
Marx was part of South Africa's squad that won the 2023 Rugby World Cup; however, he missed most of the tournament due to a knee injury suffered in training.

=== Test match record ===
As of 15 November 2026.

Against	P	W	D	L	Try	Pts	%Won
Argentina	14	12	0	2	7	35	85.71
Australia	13	5	2	6	5	25	38.46
British & Irish Lions	3	2	0	1	0	0	66.67
Canada	1	1	0	0	0	0	100
England	6	5	0	1	1	5	83.33
France	8	6	0	2	2	10	75
Georgia	1	1	0	0	1	5	100
Ireland	5	2	0	3	0	0	40
Italy	5	5	0	0	5	25	100
Japan	3	3	0	0	0	0	100
New Zealand	21	10	1	10	8	40	47.62
Scotland	4	4	0	0	0	0	100
Wales	12	8	0	4	3	15	66.67
Total	96	64	3	29	32	160	66.67

=== International tries ===
As of 15 November 2026

Try	Opposing team	Location	Venue	Competition	Date	Result	Score
1	France	Johannesburg, South Africa	Ellis Park Stadium	2017 France rugby union tour of South Africa	24 June 2017	Win	35–12
2	Australia	Perth, Australia	Perth Oval	2017 Rugby Championship	9 September 2017	Draw	23–23
3	New Zealand	Cape Town, South Africa	Newlands Stadium	2017 Rugby Championship	7 October 2017	Loss	24–25
4	New Zealand	Wellington, New Zealand	Wellington Regional Stadium	2018 Rugby Championship	15 September 2018	Win	34–36
5	Italy	Fukuroi, Japan	Shizuoka Stadium	2019 Rugby World Cup	4 October 2019	Win	49–3
6	Georgia	Pretoria, South Africa	Loftus Versfeld Stadium	2021 July rugby union tests	2 July 2021	Win	40–9
7	Argentina	Port Elizabeth, South Africa	Nelson Mandela Bay Stadium	2021 Rugby Championship	21 August 2021	Win	29–10
8	Australia	Gold Coast, Australia	Robina Stadium	2021 Rugby Championship	12 September 2021	Loss	28–26
9	Australia	Gold Coast, Australia	Robina Stadium	2021 Rugby Championship	12 September 2021	Loss	28–26
10	Wales	Cardiff, Wales	Millennium Stadium	2021 end-of-year rugby union internationals	6 November 2021	Win	18–23
11	Wales	Pretoria, South Africa	Loftus Versfeld Stadium	2022 Wales rugby union tour of South Africa	5 July 2022	Win	32–29
12	Argentina	Buenos Aires, Argentina	Estadio Libertadores de América	2022 Rugby Championship	17 September 2022	Win	20–36
13	Argentina	Buenos Aires, Argentina	Estadio Libertadores de América	2022 Rugby Championship	17 September 2022	Win	20–36
14	Italy	Genoa, Italy	Stadio Luigi Ferraris	2022 end-of-year rugby union internationals	19 November 2022	Win	21–63
15	New Zealand	Auckland, New Zealand	Mount Smart Stadium	2023 Rugby Championship	15 July 2023	Loss	35–20
16	Wales	Cardiff, Wales	Millennium Stadium	2023 Rugby World Cup warm-up matches	19 August 2023	Win	16–52
17	New Zealand	London, England	Twickenham Stadium	2023 Rugby World Cup warm-up matches	25 August 2023	Win	7–35
18	Australia	Perth, Australia	Perth Stadium	2024 Rugby Championship	17 August 2024	Win	12–30
19	Australia	Perth, Australia	Perth Stadium	2024 Rugby Championship	17 August 2024	Win	12–30
20	New Zealand	Cape Town, South Africa	Cape Town Stadium	2024 Rugby Championship	7 September 2024	Win	18–12
21	Argentina	Mbombela, South Africa	Mbombela Stadium	2024 Rugby Championship	28 September 2024	Win	48–7
22	Italy	Gqeberha, South Africa	Nelson Mandela Bay Stadium	2025 Italy tour of South Africa	12 July 2025	Win	45–0
23	New Zealand	Auckland, New Zealand	Eden Park	2025 Rugby Championship	6 September 2025	Loss	24–17
24	Argentina	Durban, South Africa	Kings Park Stadium	2025 Rugby Championship	27 September 2025	Win	67–30
25	Argentina	London, England	Twickenham Stadium	2025 Rugby Championship	4 October 2025	Win	27–29
26	Argentina	London, England	Twickenham Stadium	2025 Rugby Championship	4 October 2025	Win	27–29
27	England	Johannesburg, South Africa	Ellis Park Stadium	2026 Nations Championship	4 July 2026	Win	45–21
28	New Zealand	Johannesburg, South Africa	FNB Stadium	2026 New Zealand tour of South Africa	5 September 2026	Win	29–24
29	New Zealand	Baltimore, United States	M&T Bank Stadium	2026 New Zealand tour of South Africa	12 September 2026	Win	43–28
30	Italy	Turin, Italy	Juventus Stadium	2026 Nations Championship	7 November 2026	Win	7–66
31	Italy	Turin, Italy	Juventus Stadium	2026 Nations Championship	7 November 2026	Win	7–66
32	France	Saint-Denis, France	Stade de France	2026 Nations Championship	13 November 2026	Loss	21–19

== Personal life ==
Malcom is married to his wife Kirsten, with whom he has a son and daughter. He was raised with his sister Carina and brother Jean Pierre.

== Honours ==
- Rugby World Cup
  - Winner: 2019, 2023
- The Rugby Championship
  - Winner: 2019, 2024, 2025
- 2021 British & Irish Lions tour winner
- World Rugby Awards
  - Player of the Year: nominee in 2018, winner in 2025.
  - Men's 15s Dream Team of the Year: 2021, 2022, 2024, 2025
- SA Rugby Awards
  - SA Rugby Men's Player of the Year: 2017, 2025
