= Elton Jantjies =

South African rugby union player

- Full name: Elton (Ella) Thomas Jantjies
- Born: 1 August 1990 (age 36) Middelburg, Eastern Cape, South Africa
- Height: 1.76 m (5 ft 9 1/2 in)
- Weight: 88 kg (13 st 12 lb; 194 lb)
- School: Hoërskool Florida
- Notable relative: Tony Jantjies (brother)

Rugby union career
- Position: Fly-Half / Centre
Youth career
- 2006–2009: Golden Lions
Amateur team(s)
Years	Team	Apps	(Points)
2011–2014	Golden Lions	3	(12)
- Correct as of 22 March 2014
Senior career
Years	Team	Apps	(Points)
2014–2018	Shining Arcs	18	(98)
2021	Pau	3	(26)
2022	Red Hurricanes Osaka	1	(0)
2023	Agen	11	(65)
- Correct as of 14 July 2024
Provincial / State sides
Years	Team	Apps	(Points)
2010–2020	Golden Lions	51	(536)
Super Rugby
Years	Team	Apps	(Points)
2011–2012	Lions	26	(228)
2013	Stormers	13	(11)
2014–2020	Lions	109	(982)
- Correct as of 28 April 2024
International career
Years	Team	Apps	(Points)
2010	South Africa U20	5	(12)
2012–2022	South Africa	46	(335)
- Correct as of 27 August 2022

Elton Thomas Jantjies (born 1 August 1990) is a South African professional rugby union player who plays as fly-half.

Jantjies made his professional debut with the Lions during the 2011 Super Rugby season, and his international debut with the Springboks during the inaugural Rugby Championship. He has received several significant sporting awards, including the SARU Young Player of the Year award (2010), and the SA U20 Player of the Year award (2010).

In June 2014 it was reported that Jantjies had signed a contract with Japanese side NTT Communications Shining Arcs who play in the Top League. This move meant that he was ruled out for the Currie Cup competition in 2014.

The fly-half tested positive for the substance Clenbuterol which is a banned substance and subsequently received a 4-year ban from rugby, ultimately ending his career in a swarm of controversies.

== Domestic career ==
=== Golden Lions: 2011–14 ===
Jantjies gained a reputation as being a clutch performer after he successfully converted every goal attempt in the 2011 Currie Cup final, a match in which the Golden Lions defeated the Sharks 42–16. This performance earned him the Man of the Match award.

=== Super Rugby: 2011–2020 ===
Jantjies made his Super Rugby debut in 2011 for the Lions. He joined the Stormers for the 2013 season on a loan deal after the Lions were relegated from the South African conference. His stint with the Stormers was largely unsuccessful compared to the previous season with the Lions where he had an 86% goal-kicking success rate. He returned to the Lions who had won promotion back to the Super Rugby competition.

Jantjies reached the finals with the Lions in both 2016 where the Lions lost to the Hurricanes in Wellington and 2017 where they lost to the Crusaders at their home crowd in Johannesburg, playing a huge part in getting them there. Jantjies was also the highest points scorer in the competition in 2017, scoring 203 points that season.

== International career ==
Jantjies made his international rugby test debut for the South Africa national rugby union team during the inaugural Rugby Championship against Australia on 29 September 2012 at Loftus Versfeld, however his debut for the Springboks came in a non-test uncapped game against the Barbarians in the 2010 end-of-year tests.

Jantjies was named in South Africa's squad for the 2019 Rugby World Cup. South Africa went on to win the tournament, defeating England in the final.

== International statistics ==
=== Test Match record ===
Against	P	W	D	L	Tri	Con	Pen	DG	Pts	%Won
Argentina	6	5	0	1	1	13	19	0	88	83.33
Australia	7	2	2	3	0	14	7	0	49	28.57
British & Irish Lions	1	0	0	1	0	0	0	0	0	0
Canada	1	1	0	0	0	8	0	0	16	100
England	4	1	0	3	0	1	2	0	8	25
France	4	4	0	0	1	10	9	0	52	100
Georgia	1	1	0	0	0	1	0	0	2	100
Ireland	4	2	0	2	0	6	7	0	33	50
Italy	2	1	0	1	0	1	1	0	5	50
Namibia	1	1	0	0	0	6	0	0	12	100
New Zealand	7	2	0	5	0	3	7	1	30	28.57
Scotland	2	2	0	0	0	1	4	0	14	100
Wales	6	2	0	4	0	2	6	0	22	33.33
Total	46	24	2	20	2	66	62	1	331	52.17

P = Games Played, W = Games Won, D = Games Drawn, L = Games Lost, Tri = Tries Scored, Con = Conversions Scored, Pen = Penalties Scored, DG = Drop Goals Scored, Pts = Points Scored

=== International tries ===
Try	Opponent	Location	Venue	Competition	Date	Result	
1	France	Durban, South Africa	2017 France tour of South Africa	17 June 2017	Win	37–15	
2	Argentina	Salta, Argentina	Padre Ernesto Stadium	2017 Rugby Championship	26 August 2017	Win	23–41

== Personal life ==
He is the older brother of fly-half Tony Jantjies. Weeks before he joined the Stormers, his father Thomas Jantjies died in hospital after being stung by a bee. In previous interviews, Jantjies had described his father as his mentor and kicking coach.

== Further Controversies ==
In May 2022, it was reported that Jantjies had been arrested at OR Tambo International Airport in Johannesburg, following his reported behaviour on an Emirates flight from Dubai to Johannesburg. He is reported as having: '... spent 10 minutes banging on the toilet door of an Emirates Airlines flight from Dubai until his fists bled. A fellow passenger alleges that Jantjies could be heard saying “Komaan, my skat (Come on, my darling)”, to an air hostess hiding in the cubicle.'

In August 2023, Jantjies was suspended from playing rugby professionally as a result of a finding that he had used a prohibited substance, Clenbuterol. His suspension was replaced with a four-year ban on 18 January 2024.
