= Andries Coetzee =

South African rugby union player (born 1990)

- Born: 1 March 1990 (age 36) Bethal, South Africa
- Height: 1.81 m (5 ft 11 1/2 in)
- Weight: 92 kg (203 lb; 14 st 7 lb)
- School: Hoër Tegniese Skool Middelburg

Rugby union career
- Position: Fullback / Winger
- Current team: Lions / Golden Lions
Senior career
Years	Team	Apps	(Points)
2011–2016	Golden Lions XV	5	(20)
2012–2018	Golden Lions	46	(65)
2012–2020	Lions	98	(89)
2013	→ Sharks	1	(0)
2019–2021	Kintetsu Liners	2	(0)
2021−2022	Benetton	9	(6)
2022–2024	Lions	23	(23)
2023–2024	Golden Lions	5	(0)
- Correct as of 18 June 2024
International career
Years	Team	Apps	(Points)
2017	South Africa	13	(0)
- Correct as of 17 April 2018

Andries 'Boeboes' Coetzee (born 1 March 1990) is a South African rugby union player for the Lions in United Rugby Championship. He usually plays as a fullback.

From 2011 to 2020, he played for Lions in Super Rugby and Golden Lions in the Currie Cup. In 2013 Coetzee played for Sharks, on loan. He played for Benetton in United Rugby Championship in 2021−22 season.

In 2017 Coetzee played for the South Africa squad.
