= Lourens Erasmus =

South African rugby union player (born 1993)

- Full name: Lourens Jacobus Erasmus
- Born: 14 June 1993 (age 33) Pretoria, South Africa
- Height: 2.00 m (6 ft 6 1/2 in)
- Weight: 115 kg (18 st 2 lb; 254 lb)
- School: Hoërskool Garsfontein, Pretoria
- University: University of Johannesburg / University of South Africa

Rugby union career
- Position: Lock
- Current team: Toyota Verblitz
Youth career
- 2012–2014: Golden Lions
Amateur team(s)
Years	Team	Apps	(Points)
2013	UJ	0	(0)
Senior career
Years	Team	Apps	(Points)
2014–2017	Golden Lions XV	18	(35)
2015–2016	Golden Lions	11	(20)
2016–2018	Lions	44	(20)
2017–2022	NTT DoCoMo Red Hurricanes	13	(20)
2022–2025	Urayasu D-Rocks	17	(5)
2025-	Toyota Verblitz	15	(15)
- Correct as of 21 February 2021

Lourens Jacobus Erasmus (born 14 June 1993) is a South African professional rugby union player for the Lions in Super Rugby and NTT DoCoMo Red Hurricanes in the Japanese Top League. His regular position is lock.

== Career ==
Erasmus attended Hoërskool Garsfontein in Pretoria between 2007 and 2011, but never represented the Blue Bulls at any high school rugby tournaments. After matriculating in 2011, he made the move to Johannesburg to join the Golden Lions academy prior to the 2012 season. He started in twelve of the Golden Lions U19 side's matches during the 2012 Under-19 Provincial Championship, scoring two tries in an 83–3 victory over SWD U19 in their final match of the regular season as the Golden Lions finished in fourth position on the log to qualify for the semi-finals. One of his starts came in the semi-final against Western Province U19, but he could not prevent the side from Cape Town winning the match 24–14.

He moved up to Under-21 level in 2013 and played in seven matches for the Golden Lions U21. He once again finished the regular season by scoring two tries in a match, this time in a 76–7 victory over the Border U21s, and once again suffered a semi-final defeat at the hands of Western Province, who beat the Golden Lions U21s 44–41 after extra time.

In 2014, Erasmus was included in the Golden Lions squad for the 2014 Vodacom Cup competition. He made his first class debut by coming on as a late replacement in a match against near-neighbours the Falcons in a 23–22 victory. After another appearance off the bench against the Blue Bulls, Eramus scored his first senior try in a 40–37 victory over the Griffons in Johannesburg. He made his first start in their Round Six match against the Limpopo Blue Bulls in Polokwane and scored one of the Golden Lions' sixteen tries in a 110–0 victory. The Golden Lions finished in fourth spot on the Northern Section log to secure a place in the quarter finals, where they met a Sharks XV that topped the Southern Section. Erasmus played off the bench in a 27–20 victory in the match in Durban and also in their 16–15 victory over trans-Jukskei rivals the Blue Bulls. He started the final against the Griquas in Kimberley in an unfamiliar Eighth man role and could not prevent his side losing the match 6–30 to finish the competition as runners-up. He was named in the Golden Lions U21 squad for the 2014 Under-21 Provincial Championship, but failed to make any appearances in the competition.

He returned to action for the Golden Lions in the 2015 Vodacom Cup. He made three appearances as a replacement during the regular season of the competition and started their 29–21 quarter final victory over the SWD Eagles. He didn't feature in the semi-final, which saw eventual champions the Pumas win the match 43–20. Erasmus was included in the Golden Lions' Currie Cup side for the first time in 2015 Currie Cup Premier Division and was named on the bench for their Round Five match against the Eastern Province Kings in Johannesburg.

In the Golden Lions' opening match of the 2016 Currie Cup Premier Division against the Pumas, Erasmus scored a try after just 8.5 seconds, the fastest try in the history of the competition.

== Statistics ==
As of 2 November 2015.

First class career
Season	Teams	Currie Cup		Vodacom Cup		Other		Total	
Season	Teams	Apps	Pts	Apps	Pts	Apps	Pts	Apps	Pts
2014	Golden Lions	—	—	9	10	—	—	9	10
2015	Golden Lions	6	15	4	0	—	—	10	15
Career Total		6	15	13	10	—	—	19	25
