= Ruan Combrinck =

South African rugby union player

- Full name: Ruan Jacobus Combrinck
- Born: 10 May 1990 (age 36) Vryheid, South Africa
- Height: 1.83 m (6 ft 0 in)
- Weight: 99 kg (15 st 8 lb; 218 lb)
- School: Michaelhouse
- University: Stellenbosch University

Rugby union career
- Position: Winger / Fullback / Centre
Senior career
Years	Team	Apps	(Points)
2010	Western Province	1	(0)
2012–2019	Golden Lions XV	14	(41)
2012–2015	Golden Lions	29	(145)
2012–2019	Lions	72	(153)
2019–2020	Stade Français	4	(10)
2021–2022	Blue Bulls	2	(0)
2021–2022	Bulls	1	(0)
- Correct as of 16 September 2022
International career
Years	Team	Apps	(Points)
2016	South Africa	7	(15)
2016	Springbok XV	1	(0)
2017	South Africa 'A'	1	(0)
- Correct as of 17 April 2018

Ruan Jacobus Combrinck (born 10 May 1990) is a South African rugby union player. He plays mostly as a wing. He plays for Stade Français in the Top14 in France. He previously played for the Lions in Super Rugby, the Golden Lions and Western Province domestically and Kintetsu Liners in the Japanese Top League.

== School career ==
Combrinck attended Michaelhouse in The Natal Midlands and played in the same first team as Springboks fly-half Patrick Lambie and scrum-half Ross Cronje

== International rugby ==
On 28 May 2016, Combrinck was included in a 31-man South Africa squad for their three-test match series against a touring Ireland team.

He made his debut as replacement for the Springboks on 18 June 2016 vs. Ireland at Emirates Park in Johannesburg. He scored a try on debut and was also Man of the Match.

== Honours ==
- Super Rugby runner up (3) 2016, 2017, 2018
- Currie Cup winner 2021
