= Lionel Mapoe =

South African rugby union player

- Full name: Grenton Lionel Starlone Mapoe
- Born: 13 July 1988 (age 38) Port Elizabeth, South Africa
- Height: 1.82 m (5 ft 11 1/2 in)
- Weight: 95 kg (14 st 13 lb; 209 lb)
- School: Hoërskool Fichardtpark
- Occupation: Rugby player

Rugby union career
- Position: Outside-Centre / Winger
- Current team: Bulls / Blue Bulls
Youth career
- 2004–2009: Free State Cheetahs
Senior career
Years	Team	Apps	(Points)
2008–2009	Free State Cheetahs	12	(30)
2010	Cheetahs XV	1	(0)
2010	Cheetahs	5	(5)
2011–2019	Lions	108	(150)
2011–2018	Golden Lions	38	(35)
2013	→ Bulls	12	(10)
2015–2018	Kubota Spears	21	(60)
2018	Golden Lions XV	1	(0)
2019–2020	Stade Français	12	(0)
2020–2021	Nice	10	(25)
2021–2024	Blue Bulls	13	(10)
2021–2024	Bulls	15	(15)
- Correct as of 23 July 2022
International career
Years	Team	Apps	(Points)
2008	South Africa Under-20	4	(25)
2009	South Africa Sevens	6	(40)
2015–2018	South Africa	14	(10)
2017	South Africa 'A'	1	(5)
- Correct as of 25 August 2018

Grenton Lionel Starlone Mapoe (born 13 July 1988) is a former South African professional rugby union player. He played mostly as a centre or winger. He played for the Lions in Super Rugby, the Golden Lions in the Currie Cup and the Golden Lions XV in the Rugby Challenge from 2011 to 2019, having previously played for the Cheetahs and the Bulls on loan for the 2013 Super Rugby season.

== Honours ==
- Super Rugby runner up (3) 2016, 2017, 2018
- Currie Cup winner 2021
