= Lions (United Rugby Championship) =

South African rugby union team, based in Johannesburg

(South Africa) Lions
- Full name: Lions
- Union: South African Rugby Union
- Emblem: Lion
- Founded: 1889
- Location: Johannesburg, South Africa
- Ground: Ellis Park Stadium (Capacity: 62,567)
- Coach(es): Ivan van Rooyen (URC, ERCC); Mzwakhe Nkosi (CC)
- Captain(s): Francke Horn (URC & ERCC); Ruan Delport (CC)
- Most appearances: Elton Jantjies (135)
- Top scorer: Elton Jantjies (1,210)
- Most tries: Edwill van der Merwe (34)
- League(s): United Rugby Championship; European Rugby Challenge Cup; Currie Cup
- 2025–26 & 2026: URC Quarter-finalist; South African Shield: 1st 7th overall 2026 CC; Semi-finals; 4th overall
1st kit	2nd kit	3rd kit

Official website
- lionsrugby.co.za
- Current season

The Lions (known as the 10bet Lions for sponsorship reasons) is a South African professional rugby union team based in Johannesburg in the Gauteng province. They competed in the Super Rugby competition until 2020, and have competed in the United Rugby Championship since 2021 while also competing in the domestic Currie Cup competition where they are known as the 10bet Lions for sponsorship reasons. They are the successor of the teams known as Transvaal (1996), Gauteng Lions (1997) and the Cats (1998–2006).

They had varied results in Super Rugby, finishing at the bottom of the table six times (in 1998, 2003, 2004, 2008, 2010 and 2012), but reaching the semifinal stage five times (in 2000, 2001, 2016, 2017 and 2018). They reached their first final in 2016 – where they lost to the Hurricanes 20–3 in Wellington – The Lions made the final again in 2017 but this time on their own ground but lost again against the Crusaders with the final score being 17–25. The team reached their 3rd consecutive final in 2018 when they lost against the Crusaders 38–17 in Christchurch. Their most successful coach was Johan Ackermann. The team plays its home matches at Ellis Park Stadium.

The team faced relegation from the Super 14 after the Southern Spears won a court ruling that they should be included in the competition in place of the lowest ranked South African team in the 2006 competition. However, the Spears and the country's national federation, the South African Rugby Union, reached a settlement of their legal case. By the terms of the settlement, announced on 16 November 2006, the financially troubled Spears abandoned their case.

As part of a second attempt to introduce Super Rugby into the Eastern Cape, the South African Rugby Union mandated that the Lions, who finished bottom of the 2012 Super Rugby table, would be replaced in the 2013 competition by the Southern Kings from Port Elizabeth. The Lions' exclusion lasted just one season as they regained their place in Super Rugby for the 2014 season by beating the Southern Kings in a two leg playoff after the Kings finished bottom of the 2013 South African conference.

== History ==
=== Pre-franchise history ===
The Transvaal Rugby Football Union, with its headquarters in Johannesburg, was formed in 1889 after delegates from different clubs in the region decided to form a united rugby union to look after the well-being of the clubs. Prominent clubs involved in the process were Pirates, Wanderers, Pretoria, Potchefstroom and Kaffrarians. The first elected president was Bill Taylor (born 1858). Transvaal's first match was against Griquas in Kimberley on 31 August 1889.

The original colours used by Transvaal were dark blue and white jerseys, blue shorts and blue-and-white socks. It is unsure when the union decided to switch over to a white jersey with a red hoop with black shorts and socks. There is also a school of thought that the union adopted the famous Kilmarnock strip of white top with red hoop as a Kilmarnock member, Alex Frew, captained them when they beat The British Isles touring team in 1903. These colours are still in use today. It is also from these colours that the teams’ nickname, "Rooibontes" came from.

The original union encompassed a much bigger catchment area than it does currently. Unions that gained independence from Transvaal are Western Transvaal (currently the Leopards) in 1920, Northern Transvaal (currently the Blue Bulls) in 1938, and Eastern Transvaal (currently the Pumas) in 1948. Robert Owen Loftus Versfeld, after which the stadium in Pretoria is named, was a lifetime member of the Transvaal Rugby Football Union. According to a Lions tale – 120 years of the red and white, Versfeld died of a heart attack at Ellis Park in 1932 when he attended a match between Transvaal and the Free State.

The union has undergone several name changes in recent years – first changing its name to the Lions in 1993, the Gauteng Lions in 1997, before finally changing to The Golden Lions Rugby Union (GLRU) in 1998. The GLRU competes in the Currie Cup and Vodacom Cup competitions under the sponsorship name of Xerox Golden Lions. The GLRU served as the main feeder union for the Lions, in Super Rugby, and since 2021 in the United Rugby Championship, which also encompass the Pumas and the Leopards, although very few of their players have been historically selected. The Golden Lions and Lions share the same home stadium, Ellis Park, located in the suburb of Doornfontein.

=== Financial turmoil ===
In the 1980s the union ran into serious financial trouble, mostly as a result of redeveloping Ellis Park. Transvaal supporters nearly did not have a union to support anymore as at one stage the most likely outcome was that the union would disband. In 1984 the union had R37 million of debts to repay, which forced Volkskas Bank to carry the union for a period. This debt mainly came from the union redeveloping the old Ellis Park into a modern 80,000- seat stadium in 1980. The union started out with R1 million of its own money, and intended to raise another R12 million through the sales of suites and life memberships. However, due to the underperforming team, the union had a hard time to sell these ideas to businessmen and the intended revenue to fund the stadium never materialized.

In March 1984 Volkskas took over the management of Ellis Park. By August the union was told to repay debts of more than R40 million by 4 September. According to Louis Luyt in his autobiography, Walking Proud, the union was left with interest amounting to R20,000 per day. It was at this time that the then president Jannie le Roux was ousted by the clubs on 3 September 1984, and in his place came self-made millionaire Dr. Louis Luyt, a former provincial lock forward for the Orange Free State. Through the business acumen of Dr Luyt, the union was able to become financially stable once again. Dr Luyt saw an opportunity to use Ellis Park as a way for the union to cover its debt, and according to him, he used this asset as a means of renegotiating the unions’ debt with Volkskas Bank and the Johannesburg City Council.

In order to refinance the debt the union would relinquish control of Ellis Park, and control of the stadium would be taken by a new company called Ellis Park Stadium Incorporated (EPSI) on which Volkskas would have 6 board members, the City Council 3 members and the Louis Luyt group 3 members. Thus the rugby union had no representation on the board. The rugby union would however be contractually obliged to play all future matches at the venue, and would have first right over the use of Ellis Park. However, 20% of all gate receipts generated would be paid over to EPSI. However, Volkskas was not fond of this idea, and eventually took complete control over the stadium as a new company called Ellis Park Stadium Pty Ltd. According to Luyt the union would now be allowed to keep 25% of its gate revenue plus R100 000 of the advertising revenue. Luyt also managed to negotiate a clause stipulating that the rugby union had first right of refusal should Volkskas decide to sell the stadium in the future.

In 1987 the bank decided to sell the stadium to Johan Claassen (a former Springbok) for R26.5 million, but with the union having first right of refusal, Luyt started working along with First National Bank (FNB) to buy the stadium back for the union. At the time FNB wanted to rename the stadium First National Stadium, although the City Council was against this as they wanted the stadium to retain the name of their former city councilman who provided the area for the stadium. This is in stark contrast when the stadium name was sold to Coca-Cola in 2008. Eventually FNB provided the union with the finance needed to take control of the stadium. Luyt reduced the capacity of the stadium from 80 000 to 60 000 by adding 88 suites behind the two goal posts. His rationale for this was that the general public preferred to sit on the sides of the field, thus these seats were deemed economically unviable. However, companies were satisfied to have any suite in the stadium. Thus even when losing 20 000 seats, the union was able to generate a bigger income from this "dead space" of the stadium. Even before construction on the suites started, they were fully subscribed. The cost of building the suites were R4 million, and the revenue of selling these were R25 million. Even though seating was reduced the union was able to show a constant revenue stream because of the suites.

Eventually Luyt listed the stadium on the stock exchange, although this venture was unsuccessful. In spite of the unsuccessful stock exchange listing the union was able to repay all of its debt by 1993. Ellis Park was known as Coca-Cola Park between 2008 and 2012, although as one of the FIFA World Cup 2010 venues, for the period of the world cup, it was known as Ellis Park again. The stadium, and surrounding swimming arena and indoor sports arena, is run by Ellis Park World of Sport Pty Ltd, in which the GLRU has a stake.

=== Trans-National Competitions ===
==== Super Rugby ====
===== Transvaal (1993–1995) =====
The Super 10 was a rugby union tournament featuring ten teams from Australia, New Zealand, South Africa, Tonga, and Western Samoa. The competition ran for three years from 1993 to 1995 and was the predecessor of the Super 12 and Super 14, now known as Super Rugby. Transvaal won the competition in 1993 beating Auckland 20–17 at Ellis Park in the final after winning all four their pool games and were finalists again in 1995, losing to Queensland.

===== Transvaal/Gauteng Lions (1996–1997) =====
When the Super 12 was launched in 1996, both Australia and New Zealand created franchise-based models for their teams in the new tournament. South Africa used the previous seasons Currie Cup to determine what provinces would play in the new international tournament. Transvaal played in the first ever season, winning three of their 11 fixtures, finishing in 10th position on the end of season ladder, above the Canterbury Crusaders and the Western Province.

Transvaal were again promoted to the Super 12 for the 1997 season, and played under the title of the Gauteng Lions. The Lions' season was a lot more successful than their results in the inaugural season. The Lions won and lost five matches, and drawing one, to finish in fifth place overall on the end of season table, two points behind the fourth-placed Natal Sharks, narrowly missing out on a place in the finals.

===== Cats (1998–2005) =====
Cats logo.

For the 1998 season SA Rugby changed the Currie Cup qualification process for the Super 12, following Australia and New Zealand by forming provincial franchises. The Cats, or Golden Cats were established as one of the four new franchises, and were centered around the Golden Lions, as well as the Leopards and Pumas, as well as drawing from the Free State, Griffons and Griquas. The Cats home ground was to be shared between Ellis Park and the Free State Stadium.

The Cats did not make the finals in their first two seasons, but the appointment of former New Zealand coach Laurie Mains for the 2000 season signalled a change in fortunes. After defeating the Bulls in Pretoria in the opening round, they also defeated the Stormers at home in round two. However, the Cats' good fortunes soon went sour as they fell to four straight losses, even going down 64–0 to the Brumbies. The losing streak was snapped when the Cats pulled off a one-point victory over the Sharks in Durban. Following a bye, the Cats stormed through the remainder of the season undefeated to finish in fourth position, their best finish yet, as well as qualifying for a semi-final.

The semi-final was played at the Brumbies' home ground in Canberra, with the home side winning 28–3 to knock the Cats out of the finals. The 2001 Super 12 season started off in a positive style for the Cats; defeating the Stormers 29–24, and then crushing the Highlanders 56–21, as well as narrowly losing a reply of last season's semi-final against the Brumbies 19–17. The Cats qualified for the finals again, finishing in third place bettering last season's fourth. However, they were again knocked out in the semi-finals, losing 30–12, this time to the Sharks. The Cats did not qualify for the finals the next few seasons. Then the Super 12 was expanded into the Super 14 for the 2006 season, with the addition of two new teams; the Cheetahs and the Western Force. The Cats finished in 13th place overall.

===== Lions (2006–2011) =====
On 8 September 2006, the Golden Lions Rugby Union, the union that at the time operated both the Golden Lions and the Cats, announced that the team would be known in the future as the Lions, and unveiled a new logo.

During the 2010 Super 14 season, the Lions lost all 13 games of the season, setting a new record. The previous record was held by the Bulls, with 0 wins from the 11-game season in 2002. On 20 January 2011, the club announced a 3-year sponsorship deal with telecoms company MTN. From 2011 to 2012 they were known as the MTN Lions for sponsorship reasons. Ivor Ichikowitz and Robert Gumede pledged to purchase a 49.9% stake in the club through their investment company GumaTac in October 2010. The deal fell apart in 2011 due to differences with GLRU executives. In February 2011, the club signed Springbok fly-half Butch James among other high-profile signings Lionel Mapoe, Pat Cilliers and Rory Kockott.

===== Relegation and Lions Challenge Series, 2012–2013 =====
After finishing on the bottom of the Super Rugby table for the third time in five seasons, South African Rugby Union (SARU) officials voted in August 2012 to relegate the Lions from the competition and promote the Eastern Cape-based Southern Kings.
On 10 January 2013, the GLRU launched a schedule of 16 matches called the 2013 Lions Challenge Series. This series would begin on 19 January against Russia, and conclude on 20 July against Top 14 team Grenoble, to be followed by the Super Rugby promotion/relegation play-off. At the launch of the series, President Kevin de Klerk said:

We took major umbrage to the decision made in Cape Town last year to relegate us, and the easy route would have been to play the blame game and look for scapegoats... But we have decided to get on with the rugby and ensure we continue to serve our stakeholders."

Several of the scheduled Lions Challenge games, including a proposed tour to the United States, never took place. Thus the idea of a Challenge Series was perceived to have failed. But despite not having the best lead up to the important Super Rugby promotion match-up with the Southern Kings later that year, the Lions ended up winning the two legged series. Thus they were promoted back into Super Rugby for 2014.

===== Resurgence: 2014–2018 =====
Determined to establish themselves as a top team in Super Rugby, the Lions made wholesale changes to the team, including hiring Johan Ackermann and Swys de Bruin as main coaches, overhauling much of the playing squad, and adopting a much more open and fluid playing style.

The Lions returned to Super Rugby by defeating the Cheetahs in their first match back in the competition. They ended up winning 7 out of 16 matches and ended 12th, above the Reds, Cheetahs and Rebels.

The 2015 season brought even more success to the union as they won 9 out of 16 matches, including 3 out of 4 matches on tour to Australasia. The Lions lost out to a spot in the play-offs when they drew to the Stormers in their final group stage match.

The 2016 season was expanded to 18 teams with the Jaguares (Argentina), Sunwolves (Japan) and Southern Kings (South Africa) joining the competition. The Lions would start the season on tour beating the Sunwolves and Chiefs but losing to the Highlanders in the final game. The Lions would go on to win 11 out of 15 matches in the group stages to top the Africa 2 conference and top the Africa group and were awarded with their first conference trophy. They ended 2nd on the overall log and qualified for their first knockout match since being re-branded as the Lions. In the quarter-final they beat the Crusaders and the Highlanders in the semi-final to qualify for their first final since the current Super Rugby competition began in 1996. On 6 August they played in the final against The Hurricanes away from home with cold, wet and windy conditions that would favor the home team, as they lost 20–3.

In the 2017 season the Lions would get an easier draw, which meant they only had to face Australian teams and no New Zealand teams. With this advantage they would win 14 out of 15 matches, only losing one game away from home to the Jaguares due to sending another weaker team to Argentina. The Lions would not regret the decision as they would top the overall log to gain home advantage throughout the playoffs. The Lions would go on to beat the Sharks in the quarter-final and were tasked to face their first New Zealand opposition in the semi-final, the Hurricanes, whom they would defeat. The Lions became only the second South African franchise since the Bulls (2009, 2010) to qualify for back-to-back finals. They hosted the final at Ellis Park against the Crusaders (setting the record for attendance at a Super Rugby final in the process), but lost 25–17 as they were forced to play much of the match short-handed after second-rower Kwagga Smith was sent off for a late tackle in the air. This was Ackermann's final game as head coach, having previously accepted a move to Aviva Premiership side Gloucester Rugby for 2017–18: de Bruin was promoted as his replacement for 2018.

The 2018 season produced a more mixed set of results for the team (W9, L7) but owing to the Super Rugby format at the time they still finished second on the overall table granting them a home Quarter-Final against the Jaguares (40–23) and Semi-final against the Waratahs (44–26). This saw them become the first South African team to qualify for 3 straight finals, this time away to the Crusaders. The game was comfortably won by the New Zealand side (37–18).

===== Super Rugby 2019–2020, Covid-19 Pandemic and Super Rugby Unlocked =====
The 2019 season would prove to be De Bruin's last season and would also be the first season since 2015 in which the Lions would miss the play-off spot as they finished 9th on the table with an 8–8 record. The season started on a positive with a first win in Argentina but back to back derby defeats to the Bulls (12–30) and Stormers (19–17) would be an indicator of things to come. The team rebounded to win their next 3 games including overturning a 28-point defect against the Rebels before another home derby defeat to the Sharks (5–42) confirmed that the Lions were not the same side that made it to 3 successive finals. The following Australia/New Zealand tour would also produce a mixed bag of results with a solid win over the Chiefs (23–17), a game made controversial as the Lions management switched the starting and reserve hookers around just before kick-off, sandwiched between losses to the Brumbies (31–20) and the Crusaders (36–10). Back to back home victories against the Waratahs (29–28) and the Highlanders (38–29) gave the team a chance at the play-offs but they lost 3 of their last 4 games (Sharks, Hurricanes and Bulls) with a sole derby victory against the Stormers (41–22) their only consolation.

The 2020 season would be viewed as a reset as the continuous loss of star players over the previous 2 seasons (including the likes of Malcom Marx (2019), Franco Mostert (2019), Faf De Klerk (2017), Jaco Kriel(2017), Ruan Dreyer(2017), Rohan Janse Van Rensburg (2017) and Ruan Combrink (2019) as well as an injury forced retirement to captain Warren Whitley (2019), all of whom had been capped internationally) had slowly been taking a toll combined with a new coaching team headed by Ivan Van Rooyen.

The season started horribly with reverses to the Jaguares, Sormers and 3 losses on tour to the Waratahs, Blues and Rebels with only 1 victory against the Reds (27–20). The season was then called off owing to the COVID-19 pandemic.

Later in the year, SA Rugby set up a South African only Super Rugby competition (Super Rugby Unlocked) with the Cheetahs, Pumas and Griquas all invited. The Lions won 1 of their 4 completed games (with 2 games called off due to the COVID pandemic) and finished 5th.

==== Post Covid-19 and Europe (2021–present) ====
===== Rainbow Cup (2021) =====
In 2021, it was announced that the Stormers, Bulls, Sharks and Lions would join the Pro14 (at the expense of the Cheetahs and Kings) with an intermediate tournament dubbed the Rainbow Cup was set up.

The tournament would have 2 conferences, an SA only conference and a joint Irish-Scottish-Italian-Welsh conference with the winners to face each other in a one off final.

The Lions again only won 1 game (against the Bulls 34–33) and had a fixture against the Stormers cancelled owing to a Covid outbreak in the Lion's camp. The other 4 fixtures were lost and the Lions came last in the conference

===== United Rugby Championship (2021–present) =====
The inaugural URC season kicked off on the 24 September 2021 with the Lions travelling to Italian Club Zebre. The South African's powered their way to a 35–0 halftime lead and then survived a second half comeback to prevail 38–26. However the rest of the opening tour would be characteristic of the initial struggles of all 4 South African sides with the Lions going down to the Scarlets (36–13), Glasgow Warriors (13–9) and Ulster (26–10).

They did however recover to surprise the Stormers in Cape Town in the first round of derbies (37–18) leaving the Lions as the best placed South African side after 5 rounds. Their advantage then slipped after consecutive defeats to the Sharks (37–47) the Bulls (21–13 and 10–34), the reverse Stormers fixture (10–32) and their first game against Irish juggernauts Leinster (21–13). A 37–20 win over Cardiff snapped the losing streak and the Lions took advantage recording victories over Munster (23–21), the Ospreys (45–15) and Edinburgh (15–9) before suffering a 37–10 reverse against the Sharks which was followed by a first loss at Ellis Park to an overseas team in the URC when Connacht edged them 33–30. The Lions finished strongly recording victories over Benetton (37–29) and an away win against the Dragons (11–21) which saw the Lions finish 12th with an 8–10 record and qualify for the following seasons EPCR Challenge Cup.

The 2022/2023 season opened with a trans-Juskei derby which saw the Bulls emerge 31–15 winners, but the Lions then embarked on an unbeaten overseas tour defeating the Ospreys (27–28), Cardiff (18–31) and Edinburgh (19–22) before losing at home to Ulster (37–39). The Lions then had an unexpected break as their fixture against Glasgow was postponed. This was followed by another derby loss, this time against the Stormers with the Lions blowing a 22–10 halftime lead to go down 22–31. Victories against the Dragons (33–25) and the Scarlets (32–15) followed before there was more derby misery as the Lions went down to the Sharks (37–10) and the Stormers (40–8) over the festive period.

Another tour then took place but this time the Lions lost both their games against Munster (33–3) and Connacht (43–24) before going down to the Sharks (7–29) in their 5th derby reverse of the season. The Lions then dispatched Glasgow 35–24 in a rescheduled match before snapping their losing streak against SA opposition when they beat the Bulls 29–25 at Loftus after racing to an early 20–0 lead. An away victory at Benetton (28–32) was then followed by 2 rounds of double headers with the Bulls, Leinster and Zebre with the Bulls playing Zebre and the Lions playing Leinster (a 36–39 loss against a weakened Leinster side) at Ellis Park which was followed by the Lions playing Zebre (a 50–35 victory) and the Bulls playing Leinster at Loftus in the final round of pool games. The improved performance saw the Lions miss out on a playoff spot by 3 points, finishing 9th behind the Sharks.

The 2023/2024 season opened with a derby against the Stormers in a match of two halves as the Stormers raced to a 35-7 lead by the 50th minute before a Lion's comeback came up just short in a 35-33 loss. The theme of narrow losses continued throughout the following overseas tours with defeats to Edinburgh (17-16), Benetton (15-10) and Ulster (24-17) and a sole win against the Scarlets (23-24). Back to back home games against Zebre and the Dragons (61-19 and 49-24 respectively) and an away win against the Sharks thanks to a last minute try by Marius Louw (18-20) saw the Lions get their season back on track. Back to back games against the Bulls followed with a narrow loss at Loftus (30-28) after Jordan Hendrikse missed a last minute penalty from distance and then a far more one sided game at Ellis a week later (10-25 loss).

The Lions responded with a 40-10 hiding against the Sharks before securing a historic 38-14 win away against Connacht despite a red card to prop Asenathi Ntlabakanye. The Lions inconsistent form continued the following week when the Ospreys turned on what proved to be a season defining 36-21 bonus point win. A 44-12 trashing of a second string Leinster side was immediately met with a 13-33 home reversal against Munster. A 34-13 win against Cardiff looked to have kept the Lions play-offs dream alive which was compounded when they beat a strong Glasgow side 44-21 (despite losing Flank Ruan Venter to a Red card in the first half) in a match which was turned on its head when the Lions ran in 4 tries in the space of 10 minutes in the second half. Needing 3 table points from their final game away against the Stormers to confirm their spot in the play-offs the Lions came up just short losing 29-24 and ultimately finished 9th behind the Ospreys on the number of wins tie breaker (10 vs 9) with their season long inconsistent form proving fatal. Their form was not aided by disruptions behind the scenes with media leaks, allegations against CEO Straeuli for alleged player interfearance, reports of the team being forced to live off of hot dogs on tour and then complaints' by forwards coach Albert van den Berg against technical analyst Chris Venter for the latter allegedly recording private conversations off the formers computer. Van den Berg subsequently resigned his position.

The start to the 2024/2025 season was delayed owing to a clash with the Currie Cup Final (ironically both the final and the first fixture was a Sharks v Lions game albeit at different venues) meaning the Lions first fixture was a home game against Ulster (35-22 win). The Lions would win their first 4 games which included putting 49 points in the first half against Edinburgh leaving them second on the table behind Leinster heading into their game against the Irish team. Leinster prevailed 24-6 and marked the beginning of a 4 game losing streak (vs Leinster, Munster, the Bulls and the Stormers) before winning their home match against the Stormers 30-23. They lost their next game against the Bulls (31-19) before giving the Sharks a second consecutive URC hiding at Ellis Park with a 38-14 win in wet conditions. The Lions would go on to win only 2 of their remaining matches (vs Connacht and the Ospreys) which included a 40 point thrashing by Glasgow and disappointing home losses to Benneton and the Scarlets. They would finish the season in 11th, 8 points away from the play- offs which was a massive contributor to the increasing fan pressure on Cash Van Rooyen who had overseen his 5th season in charge with no silverware and massively inconsistent results, he did however still have the support of the players.

The 2025/2026 campaign opened with 3 straight defeats on tour, including a first reverse to strugglers Zebre, which when combined with the Lion's loss in the Currie Cup final just before hand did little to ease the pressure the staff were under. The Lions were able to turn the ship around at home with wins against the Scarlets and Ulster but more focus was put on the poor attendance with just 1700 people attending the Scarlets game. Their resurgence continued when they beat the Bulls at Loftus at the end of November. A narrow loss to the Stormers in Cape Town threatened to derail their campaign but they recovered to edge the Sharks at Kings Park with a last minute try to hyped u20 scrumhalf Hashim Pead (22-23). A draw away to Ospreys seemed to hail their new found resolve before a 52-17 hammering at Ellis Park bought the team back down to Earth. The Lions went back to the drawing board and won their next 6 games on the bounce beating the Sharks and Stormers to win their first SA Shield title and then giving the Dragons, Edinburgh and eventual log winners Glasgow hidings. A similarly resurgent Connacht was put away 33-21 leaving the Lions on the cusp of their first ever play-off with 2 away games vs Leinster and Munster. They went toe to toe with Leinster for most of their game before conceding a flurry of late tries to lose 33-7 and then news broke during the week that Springbok Prop Asenathi Ntlabakanye was to be banned for 18 months due to illegal substance intake but were able to get their necessary table point in a 24-17 loss to Munster leaving the Lions 7th on the table and qualify for the play-offs with an away Quarter Final v Leinster. Leinster easily bashed the Lions 59-10 knocking them out but clear progress had been achieved.

=== Domestic competitions ===
==== Currie Cup (1889- Present) ====
Transvaal was included in the inaugural tournament in 1892 alongside Western Province (Stormers); Griqualand West (Griquas); Natal (Sharks) and Border (Border Bulldogs) however would have to wait until 1922 for their first win. In 1938, the Transvaal union split with the creation of Northern Transvaal (Blue Bulls) but in 1939 would beat Western Province (17-6) in the first ever final.

A second place finish would occur in 1947 with a 16-12 loss to Western Province before back to back wins in the 1950 and 1952 editions against Western Province in the first final held in Johannesburg and away against Boland respectively. It would be almost 20 years before the franchise won their 4th trophy with a 14-14 draw against Northern Transvaal in Johannesburg that saw the trophy shared before beating Eastern Transvaal the following season for trophy number 5.

Another trophy drought will follow which saw the occasional final appearance such as in 1986,1987 and then again in 1991 and 1992 to Northern Transvaal and Natal respectively. They would however get their revenge in the 1993 season when they beat Natal in Durban to break the drought. They would repeat the feat in 1994 putting 50 away against Free State (Cheetahs). This would be the last time they would win the Currie Cup under the Transvaal name as the name switched to the Lions in 1993. The Lions beat Natal again in Durban in the 1999 edition before losing 2 finals in the next decade (2002 vs the Bulls and 2007 against the Cheetahs).

They would break this drought in 2011 with a 42-16 thrashing of the Sharks at Ellis. They made the semi finals of the next two editions before losing the 2014 final to Western Province 19-16. They would get revenge the following season where the Lions would not only get their revenge against Western Province in the final (32-24) but would not lose a game the entire season. This would be the last time the Lions have won the Currie Cup with further final losses to the Cheetahs in 2019 (31-28) despite a second half comeback and then in 2024 they would lose to an overtime penalty kick from distance by their former Flyhalf Jordan Hendrikse in ice cold conditions at Ellis Park(14-16). The Lions again hosted the 2025 final but would again lose to an overtime penalty this time to the Griquas (25-27).

==== SA Under 23 Cup (2026-Present) ====
The SA Under 23 Cup was started in 2026 and is contested by the 4 URC sides (Stormers, Bulls, Sharks and Lions) where at least 16 of the match day 23 must be 23 or younger. In the inaugural competition, the Lions finished the pool stage unbeaten with 5 wins out of 5 before losing the final to the Bulls (32-33) at Ellis Park.

== Location ==
They are based in New Doornfontein, Johannesburg, and have always been centred around the Lions union (Johannesburg), drawing players from that union since the inception of the competition as Super 12 in 1996.

Through 2005, the Cats also drew players from the two unions based in Free State —the Free State Cheetahs (Bloemfontein) and Griffons (Welkom)— and the Griquas (Northern Cape). That arrangement ended when the Cheetahs were admitted to the competition.

Starting in 2006, they drew players from the Leopards (North West) and Pumas (Mpumalanga) unions, which previously were in the franchise areas of the Bulls.

From the start of 2017, they could only draw players from the Griquas (Northern Cape).

As of 2020, only players contracted by the Lions franchise were drawn.

=== Stadium ===
The Lions' home ground is Ellis Park Stadium named after an employee from the Johannesburg City Council, Mr JD Ellis, with whom the rugby union negotiated to acquire the land on which the stadium is built. Ellis Park has hosted a number of memorable matches including the 1995 Rugby World Cup final, which was played between the All Blacks and South Africa, which saw South Africa win the William Webb Ellis Cup for the first time.

== Current squad ==
The Lions squad for the 2026–27 United Rugby Championship is: (Note: Hyron Andrews was named in the original Lions squad, but passed away in October 2026.)

2026–27 Lions squad
**Props**: (South Africa) Eddie Davids; (South Africa) SJ Kotze; (South Africa) Sebastian Lombard; (South Africa) Morgan Naudé; (South Africa) Cecil Parsons; (South Africa) Juan Schoeman; (South Africa) RF Schoeman; (South Africa) Ruan Swart; (South Africa) Conraad van Vuuren; (South Africa) **Boan Venter**; **Hookers**: (South Africa) PJ Botha; (South Africa) Morné Brandon; (South Africa) Marno Grobbelaar; (South Africa) Tiaan Lange; (South Africa) Mahle Sithole; **Locks**: (South Africa) Ruan Delport; (South Africa) JP du Preez; (South Africa) Marco Ferreira; (South Africa) JD Hattingh; (South Africa) Reinhard Nothnagel; (South Africa) Etienne Oosthuizen; (South Africa) James Schnetler; (South Africa) Dylan Sjoblom	**Back row**: (South Africa) Thando Biyela; (South Africa) Jarod Cairns; (South Africa) Luke Cannon; (South Africa) Renzo du Plessis; (South Africa) Batho Hlekani; (South Africa) Francke Horn **(c)**; (South Africa) Siba Mahashe; (South Africa) **Sikhumbuzo Notshe**; (South Africa) JC Pretorius; (South Africa) Sibabalo Qoma; (South Africa) Morne Venter; (South Africa) **Ruan Venter**; **Scrum-halves**: (South Africa) Zian Cilliers; (South Africa) Layton Horn; (South Africa) Asad Moos; (South Africa) Nico Steyn; (South Africa) **Morné van den Berg**; **Fly-halves**: (South Africa) Boeta Chamberlain; (South Africa) Sam Francis; (South Africa) Chris Smith	**Centres**: (South Africa) Ethan Adams; (South Africa) Likhona Finca; (South Africa) Rynhardt Jonker; (South Africa) Richard Kriel; (South Africa) Bronson Mills; (South Africa) Henco van Wyk; **Wings**: (South Africa) Erich Cronjé; (South Africa) Angelo Davids; (South Africa) Jason Hugo; (Democratic Republic of the Congo) Daniel Kasende *; (South Africa) Rabz Maxwane; (South Africa) Kelly Mpeku; (South Africa) Keagan Smith; **Fullbacks**: (South Africa) Alzeadon Felix; (South Africa) **Quan Horn**; (South Africa) Gilermo Mentoe
**(c)** denotes the team captain. **Bold** denotes internationally capped players. * denotes players qualified to play for South Africa on residency or dual nationality. Source:

The following players have been included so far in the Lions squad for the 2026 Currie Cup Premier Division:

2026 Lions Currie Cup squad
**Props**: (South Africa) Siya Dube (Note: Addition for 2026 Currie Cup); (South Africa) Morgan Naudé; (South Africa) Liyema Ntshanga; (South Africa) Cecil Parsons; (South Africa) Juan Schoeman; (South Africa) Ruan Swart; (South Africa) Conraad van Vuuren; **Hookers**: (Namibia) **Armand Combrinck**; (South Africa) Mahle Sithole; (South Africa) Ruan Welman; **Locks**: (South Africa) Ruan Delport **(c)**; (South Africa) Marco Ferreira; (South Africa) JD Hattingh; (South Africa) Dylan Sjoblom; (South Africa) Tiaan Wessels	**Back row**: (South Africa) Thando Biyela; (South Africa) Jarod Cairns; (South Africa) Luke Cannon; (South Africa) Renzo du Plessis; (South Africa) Vuyo Gwiji; (South Africa) Sibabalo Qoma; (South Africa) Morne Venter; **Scrum-halves**: (South Africa) Zian Cilliers; (South Africa) Layton Horn; (South Africa) Asad Moos; (South Africa) Haashim Pead; **Fly-halves**: (South Africa) Matthew Coetzee; (South Africa) Sam Francis	**Centres**: (South Africa) Ethan Adams; (South Africa) Likhona Finca; (South Africa) Rynhardt Jonker; **Wings**: (South Africa) Jason Hugo; (South Africa) Exauce Kevani; (South Africa) Rabz Maxwane; (South Africa) Keagan Smith; **Fullbacks**: (South Africa) Gilermo Mentoe; (South Africa) Latica Nela
**(c)** denotes the team captain. **Bold** denotes internationally capped players. * denotes players qualified to play for South Africa on residency or dual nationality. Source:

== Captains ==
Years	Captain
1996	(South Africa) Francois Pienaar
1997	(South Africa) Kobus Wiese
1998	(South Africa) Hannes Strydom
1999	(South Africa) Rassie Erasmus
2000	(South Africa) André Vos
2001	(South Africa) Rassie Erasmus
2002	(South Africa) Jannes Labuschagné
2003	(South Africa) Bobby Skinstad
2004–2006	(South Africa) Wikus van Heerden
2007	(South Africa) André Pretorius
2008	(South Africa) Ernst Joubert
2009–2010	(South Africa) Cobus Grobbelaar
2011	(South Africa) Franco van der Merwe
2012	(South Africa) Josh Strauss
2013	(South Africa) JC Janse van Rensburg
2014–2019	(South Africa) Warren Whiteley
2020–2021	(South Africa) Elton Jantjies
2021–2022	(South Africa) Burger Odendaal
2022–2023	(South Africa) Reinhard Nothnagel
2023–2025	(South Africa) Marius Louw
2025-	(South Africa) Francke Horn

== Coaches ==
The current head coach of the Lions super rugby team is Ivan van Rooyen, who has taken over from Swys de Bruin.

Coach	Tenure	Matches	Won	Drawn	Lost	Winning Percentage
Kitch Christie	1996	11	3	0	8	27.3%
Ray Mordt	1997	11	5	1	5	45.5%
Peet Kleynhans	1998	11	2	0	9	18.2%
Andre Markgraaff	1999	10	4	0	6	36.4%
Laurie Mains	2000–2001	22	14	0	8	63.6%
Rudy Joubert	2002	10	1	0	9	9.1%
Tim Lane	2003	11	2	0	9	18.2%
Chester Williams	2004–2005	22	2	1	19	9.1%
Frans Ludeke	2006	13	2	1	10	15.4%
Eugene Eloff	2007–2009	39	11	1	27	28.2%
Dick Muir	2010	13	0	0	13	0%
John Mitchell	2011–2012	32	6	1	25	18.8%
Johan Ackermann	2014–2017	68	45	1	22	66.2%
Swys de Bruin	2018–2019	35	19	0	16	54.2%
Ivan van Rooyen	2019–present	130	56	6	68	43.07%
Total		438	172	12	254	39.27%

== Former players ==
For a list of former and current players who have represented the Lions in Super Rugby, United Rugby Championship and European competitions, see List of Lions (United Rugby Championship) players.

== Honours ==
- United Rugby Championship South African Shield champions
  - 2025-26
- Super Rugby Runners-up
  - 2016, 2017, 2018
- Super Rugby Group Winners
  - 2016, 2017
- Super Rugby Conference Champions
  - 2016, 2017, 2018
- Super 10 Champions
  - 1993

=== Domestic honours ===
- Currie Cup Premier Division
  - Champions: (11) 1922, 1939, 1950, 1952, 1971, 1972, 1993, 1994, 1999, 2011, 2015
  - Runners-up: (14) 1947, 1968, 1974, 1986, 1987, 1991, 1992, 1996, 2002, 2007, 2014, 2019, 2024, 2025
- Vodacom Cup
  - Champions: (5) 1999, 2002, 2003, 2004, 2013
  - Runners-up: (2) 1998, 2014
- SA Rugby Under-23 Cup
  - Runners-up: (1) 2026

=== Season summaries ===
Super Rugby:

The following table summarizes the Lions' results in their Super Rugby seasons:

Team name	Competition name	Season	Played	Win	Draw	Loss	Position	Playoffs	Coach	Captain
Transvaal	Super 12	1996	11	3	0	8	10 / 12		(South Africa) Kitch Christie	(South Africa) Francois Pienaar
Gauteng Lions	Super 12	1997	11	5	1	5	5 / 12		(South Africa) Ray Mordt	(South Africa) Kobus Wiese
Golden Cats	Super 12	1998	11	2	0	9	12 / 12		(South Africa) Peet Kleynhans	(South Africa) Hannes Strydom
Cats	Super 12	1999	11	4	0	6	11 / 12		(South Africa) Andre Markgraaff	(South Africa) Rassie Erasmus
Cats	Super 12	2000	11	7	0	4	4 / 12	Semi-finals	(New Zealand) Laurie Mains	(South Africa) André Vos
Cats	Super 12	2001	11	7	0	4	3 / 12	Semi-finals	(New Zealand) Laurie Mains	(South Africa) Rassie Erasmus
Cats	Super 12	2002	11	1	0	10	11 / 12		(South Africa) Rudy Joubert	(South Africa) Jannes Labuschagné
Cats	Super 12	2003	11	2	0	9	12 / 12		(Australia) Tim Lane	(South Africa) Bobby Skinstad
Cats	Super 12	2004	11	1	0	10	12 / 12		(South Africa) Chester Williams	(South Africa) Wikus van Heerden
Cats	Super 12	2005	11	1	1	9	11 / 12		(South Africa) Chester Williams	(South Africa) Wikus van Heerden
Lions	Super 14	2006	13	2	0	10	13 / 14		(South Africa) Frans Ludeke	(South Africa) Wikus van Heerden
Lions	Super 14	2007	13	5	0	8	12 / 14		(South Africa) Eugene Eloff	(South Africa) André Pretorius
Lions	Super 14	2008	13	2	1	10	14 / 14		(South Africa) Eugene Eloff	(South Africa) Ernst Joubert
Lions	Super 14	2009	13	4	0	9	12 / 14		(South Africa) Eugene Eloff	(South Africa) Cobus Grobbelaar
Lions	Super 14	2010	13	0	0	13	14 / 14		(South Africa) Dick Muir	(South Africa) Cobus Grobbelaar
Lions	Super Rugby	2011	16	3	1	12	14 / 15		(New Zealand) John Mitchell	(South Africa) Franco van der Merwe
Lions	Super Rugby	2012	16	3	0	13	15 / 15		(New Zealand) John Mitchell	(Scotland) Josh Strauss
Lions	Super Rugby	2013	did not participate (played in promotion/relegation play-offs)							
Lions	Super Rugby	2014	16	7	0	9	12 / 15		(South Africa) Johan Ackermann	(South Africa) Warren Whiteley
Lions	Super Rugby	2015	16	9	1	6	8 / 15		(South Africa) Johan Ackermann	(South Africa) Warren Whiteley
Lions	Super Rugby	2016	15	11	0	4	2 / 18	Final	(South Africa) Johan Ackermann	(South Africa) Warren Whiteley
Lions	Super Rugby	2017	15	14	0	1	1 / 18	Final	(South Africa) Johan Ackermann	(South Africa) Warren Whiteley
Lions	Super Rugby	2018	16	9	0	7	2 / 15	Final	(South Africa) Swys de Bruin	(South Africa) Warren Whiteley
Lions	Super Rugby	2019	16	8	0	8	9 / 15		(South Africa) Swys de Bruin	(South Africa) Warren Whiteley
Lions	Super Rugby	2020 (Note: Before the 2020 season was cancelled, the Lions were sitting last in the South African Conference and thirteenth overall, with one win and five losses. They had negative ninety-one point difference (PF: 109, PA: 200), and had five match points in total.)	Cancelled due to COVID-19 pandemic						(South Africa) Ivan van Rooyen	(South Africa) Elton Jantjies
Lions	Super Rugby Unlocked	2020	6	1	2	3	5 / 7		(South Africa) Ivan van Rooyen	(South Africa) Elton Jantjies

United Rugby Championship (URC)

The following table summarises the Lions' results in their URC seasons:

Team name	Competition name	Season	Played	Win	Draw	Loss	Position	Playoffs	Cup Qualification	Coach	Captain
Lions	Rainbow cup SA	2021	6	1	1	4	4/4			(South Africa) Ivan van Rooyen	(South Africa) Dan Kriel
Lions	United Rugby Championship	2021–22	18	8	0	10	12/16			(South Africa) Ivan van Rooyen	(South Africa) Burger Odendaal
Lions	United Rugby Championship	2022–23	18	9	0	9	9/16		EPCR 22/23 Quarter Finals	(South Africa) Ivan van Rooyen	(South Africa) Reinhard Nothnagel
Lions	United Rugby Championship	2023–24	18	9	0	9	9/16		EPCR 23/24 Round of 16	(South Africa) Ivan van Rooyen	(South Africa) Marius Louw
Lions	United Rugby Championship	2024–25	18	8	0	10	11/16		EPCR 24/25 Round of 16	(South Africa) Ivan van Rooyen	(South Africa) Marius Louw
Lions	United Rugby Championship	2025-26	18	10	1	7	7/16		EPCR 25/26 Pool stage	(South Africa) Ivan van Rooyen	(South Africa) Francke Horn

=== Currie Cup finals ===
Season	Winners	Score	Runner-up	Venue
1922	Transvaal	n/a
1939	Transvaal	17–6	Western Province	Newlands, Cape Town
1947	Western Province	16–12	Transvaal	Newlands, Cape Town
1950	Transvaal	22–11	Western Province	Ellis Park, Johannesburg
1952	Transvaal	11–9	Boland	Boland Stadium, Wellington
1968	Northern Transvaal	16–3	Transvaal	Loftus Versfeld, Pretoria
1971	Transvaal	14–14	Northern Transvaal	Ellis Park, Johannesburg
1972	Transvaal	25–19	Falcons^{3}	Pam Brink Stadium, Springs
1974	Northern Transvaal	17–15	Transvaal	Loftus Versfeld, Pretoria
1986	Western Province	22–9	Transvaal	Newlands, Cape Town
1987	Northern Transvaal	24–18	Transvaal	Ellis Park, Johannesburg
1991	Blue Bulls	27–15	Transvaal	Loftus Versfeld, Pretoria
1992	Sharks	14–13	Transvaal	Ellis Park, Johannesburg
1993	Transvaal	21–15	Sharks	Kings Park, Durban
1994	Transvaal	56–35	Orange Free State^{1}	Springbok Park, Bloemfontein
1996	Sharks	33–15	Golden Lions	Ellis Park, Johannesburg
1999	Golden Lions	32–9	Sharks	Kings Park, Durban
2002	Blue Bulls^{2}	31–7	Golden Lions	Ellis Park, Johannesburg
2007	Free State Cheetahs	20–18	Golden Lions	Vodacom Park, Bloemfontein
2011	Golden Lions	42–16	Sharks	Ellis Park, Johannesburg
2014	Western Province	19–16	Golden Lions	Newlands, Cape Town
2015	Golden Lions	32–24	Western Province	Ellis Park, Johannesburg
2019	Free State Cheetahs	31–28	Golden Lions	Free State Stadium, Bloemfontein
2024	Sharks	16-14	Lions	Ellis Park, Johannesburg
2025	Griquas	27–25	Lions	Ellis Park, Johannesburg

=== Super 10 ===
Season	Winners	Score	Runner-up	Venue
1993	Transvaal	20 - 17	Auckland	Ellis Park, Johannesburg
1995	Queensland	30 - 16	Transvaal	Ellis Park, Johannesburg

=== Vodacom Cup ===
Season	Winners	Score	Runner-up	Venue
1998	Griqualand West^{4}	57 - 0	Golden Lions XV	Griqua Park, Kimberley
1999	Golden Lions XV	73 - 7	Griqualand West	Ellis Park, Johannesburg
2002	Golden Lions XV	54 - 38	Blue Bulls	Ellis Park, Johannesburg
2003	Golden Lions XV	26 - 17	Blue Bulls	Loftus Versfeld, Pretoria
2004	Golden Lions XV	35 - 16	Blue Bulls	Ellis Park, Johannesburg
2013	Golden Lions XV	42 - 28	Pumas	Mbombela Stadium, Nelspruit
2014	Griquas	30 - 6	Golden Lions XV	Griqua Park, Kimberley

=== Notes ===
^{1} Orange Free State have since been renamed to the Free State Cheetahs.
^{2} Northern Transvaal was renamed to the Blue Bulls.
^{3} The Falcons were originally known as Eastern Transvaal.
^{4} Griqualand West was renamed to Griquas.

== Team Statistics & Records ==
=== Head to head results ===
Below is the matches played by the Lions in the United Rugby Championship up until 16 May 2026 (2025-2026 United Rugby championship)

	Played	W	W(home)	W(away)	L	L(home)	L(away)	D	D(home)	D(away)	PF	PA	PD	Win%
Bennetton	5	2	1	1	3	1	2	0	0	0	125	155	-30	40
Bulls	10	2	0	2	8	5	3	0	0	0	202	317	-115	20
Cardiff	5	3	2	1	2	0	2	0	0	0	139	104	35	60
Connacht	5	3	2	1	2	1	1	0	0	0	141	118	23	60
Dragons	5	5	3	2	0	0	0	0	0	0	168	105	63	100
Edinburgh	5	4	3	1	1	0	1	0	0	0	162	83	79	80
Glasgow	5	3	3	0	2	0	2	0	0	0	142	112	32	60
Leinster	5	1	1	0	4	1	3	0	0	0	106	127	-21	20
Munster	5	1	1	0	4	1	3	0	0	0	66	128	-62	20
Ospreys	5	3	2	1	1	0	1	1	0	1	147	130	17	60
Scarlets	5	3	2	1	2	1	1	0	0	0	117	124	-7	60
Sharks	10	5	3	2	5	2	3	0	0	0	241	261	-20	50
Stormers	10	3	2	1	7	3	4	0	0	0	225	275	-50	30
Ulster	5	2	2	0	3	1	2	0	0	0	148	142	6	40
Zebre	5	4	2	2	1	0	1	0	0	0	179	111	68	80
Total	90	44	29	15	45	16	29	1	0	1	2337	2292	45	52

=== Overall team records ===
- Most tries in a season 92 -2017 (SA record)
- Most tries in a match 14 -2017 (Superugby record)
- Highest Score in match 94 -2017 (SA record)
- Most Points in a season 674 – 2017 (Superugby record)
- Highest winning margin 87 -2017 (2nd most)
- Most wins in a season 16 -2017 (SA Record)
- Most home wins in a season 9 -2017 (SA Record)
- Most Consecutive wins 12
- Most Consecutive home wins 13
- Most Consecutive away wins 6
- Most Consecutive wins versus South-African teams 19
- Most Consecutive Conference Titles 3 (SA Record; tied with Stormers)
- Most Consecutive Finals Appearances 3 (SA Record)

== Individual Statistics & Records ==
- Most tries in a season: 12 — Jaco Strydom
- Most tries in a match: 4 — Jaco Strydom and Madosh Tambwe
- Most points in a season: 190 — Elton Jantjies
- Most points in a match: 29 — Marnitz Boshoff
- Most drop goals in a match: 3 — Marnitz Boshoff
- Most drop goals in a season: 8 — Marnitz Boshoff
