= 2013 Super Rugby season =

Men's rugby union club competition

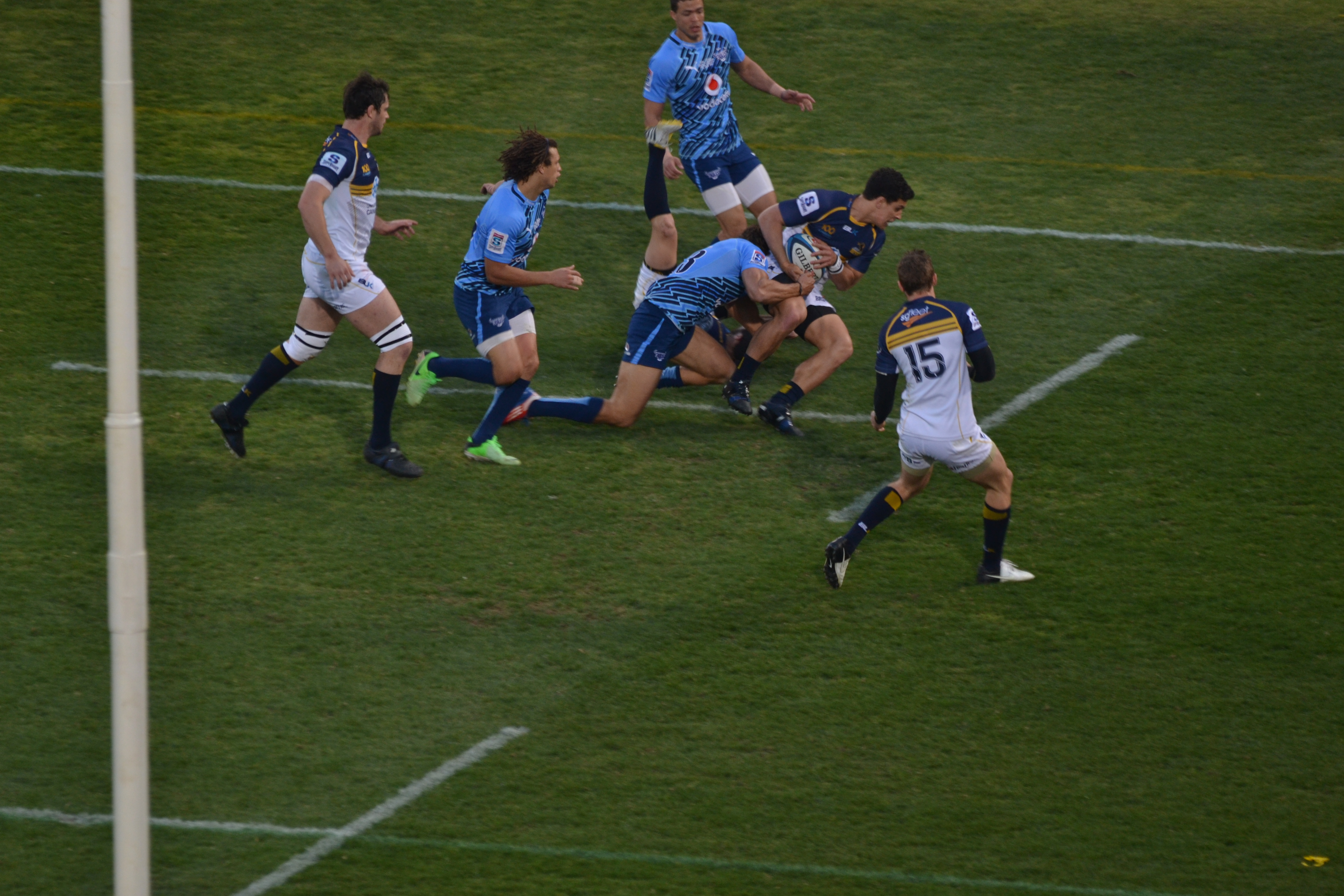
- Bulls vs Brumbies in the semifinals, 27 July 2013
- Countries: Australia (5 teams); New Zealand (5 teams); South Africa (5 teams)
- Tournament format(s): Round-robin and knockout
- Champions: Chiefs (2nd title)
- Matches played: 125
- Attendance: 2,547,183 (20,377 per match)
- Tries scored: 596 (4.77 per match)
- Top point scorer(s): Morné Steyn (248)
- Top try scorer(s): Frank Halai (10)
- Official website: Official website

The 2013 Super Rugby season was the third season of the new 15-team format for the Super Rugby competition involving teams from Australia, New Zealand and South Africa. The tournament was won by the Chiefs, who defeated the Canberra-based Brumbies 27–22 in the competition final. For sponsorship reasons, this competition is known as FxPro Super Rugby in Australia, Investec Super Rugby in New Zealand and Vodacom Super Rugby in South Africa. Including the past incarnations as Super 12 and Super 14, this was the 18th season of the Southern Hemisphere's premier domestic competition. Conference matches took place every weekend from 15 February until 13 July – with a break between rounds 17 and 18 for internationals games – followed by the play-offs series that culminated in the final on 3 August.

The 2013 season saw the Southern Kings of South Africa enter the competition for the first time, having replaced the under-performing Lions. The Kings achieved three victories in their inaugural tournament, but finished last following the regular season, and were defeated by the Lions in a two-leg play-off for a position in the South African conference for the 2014 season.

== Competition format ==
Covering 25 weeks, the schedule featured a total of 125 matches. The 15 teams were grouped by country, labelled the Australian Conference, New Zealand Conference and the South African Conference. The regular season consisted of two types of matches:

- Internal Conference Matches – Each team played the other four teams in the same conference twice, home and away.
- Cross Conference Matches – Each team played four teams of the other two conferences away, and four teams of the other two conferences home, thus missing out on two teams (one from each of the other conferences). Each team played two home and two away games against teams from each of the other countries, making a total of eight cross conference games for each team.

The top team of each conference, plus the next top three teams in table points regardless of conference (wild card teams), moved on to the finals. The top two conference winners, based on table points, received first-round byes. In the first round of the finals, the third conference winner was the #3 seed and hosted the wild card team with the worst record, and the best wild card team hosted the second-best wild card team. In the semi-finals, the #2 conference winner hosted the higher surviving seed from the first round, and the #1 conference winner hosted the other first-round winner. The final is hosted by the top remaining seed.

In addition, a two-legged promotion/relegation play-off took place at the end of the season between the bottom team in the South African Conference and the Lions, with the winner qualifying for Super Rugby in 2014.

== Standings ==
(Australia) Australian Conference
Pos	Team	Rnd	W	D	L	Bye	PF	PA	PD	TF	TA	TB	LB	Pts
1	Brumbies	18	10	2	4	2	430	295	+135	43	31	5	3	60
2	Reds	18	10	2	4	2	321	296	+25	31	23	4	2	58
3	Waratahs	18	8	0	8	2	411	371	+40	45	34	1	4	45
4	Rebels	18	5	0	11	2	382	515	−133	44	65	4	5	37
5	Force	18	4	1	11	2	267	366	−99	26	34	0	5	31

New Zealand Conference
Pos	Team	Rnd	W	D	L	Bye	PF	PA	PD	TF	TA	TB	LB	Pts
1	Chiefs	18	12	0	4	2	458	364	+94	50	38	8	2	66
2	Crusaders	18	11	0	5	2	446	307	+139	44	31	5	3	60
3	Blues	18	6	0	10	2	347	364	−17	40	36	6	6	44
4	Hurricanes	18	6	0	10	2	386	457	−71	41	49	4	5	41
5	Highlanders	18	3	0	13	2	374	496	−122	40	55	4	5	29

(South Africa) South African Conference
Pos	Team	Rnd	W	D	L	Bye	PF	PA	PD	TF	TA	TB	LB	Pts
1	Bulls	18	12	0	4	2	448	330	+118	41	34	5	2	63
2	Cheetahs	18	10	0	6	2	382	358	+24	38	32	2	4	54
3	Stormers	18	9	0	7	2	346	292	+54	30	18	1	5	50
4	Sharks	18	8	0	8	2	384	305	+79	40	31	3	5	48
5	Southern Kings	18	3	1	12	2	298	564	−266	27	69	2	0	24

Overall standings
Pos	Team	Rnd	W	D	L	Bye	PF	PA	PD	TF	TA	TB	LB	Pts
1	(New Zealand) Chiefs	18	12	0	4	2	458	364	+94	50	38	8	2	66
2	(South Africa) Bulls	18	12	0	4	2	448	330	+118	41	34	5	2	63
3	(Australia) Brumbies	18	10	2	4	2	430	295	+135	43	31	5	3	60
4	(New Zealand) Crusaders	18	11	0	5	2	446	307	+139	44	31	5	3	60
5	(Australia) Reds	18	10	2	4	2	321	296	+25	31	23	4	2	58
6	(South Africa) Cheetahs	18	10	0	6	2	382	358	+24	38	32	2	4	54
7	(South Africa) Stormers	18	9	0	7	2	346	292	+54	30	18	1	5	50
8	(South Africa) Sharks	18	8	0	8	2	384	305	+79	40	31	3	5	48
9	(Australia) Waratahs	18	8	0	8	2	411	371	+40	45	34	1	4	45
10	(New Zealand) Blues	18	6	0	10	2	347	364	−17	40	36	6	6	44
11	(New Zealand) Hurricanes	18	6	0	10	2	386	457	−71	41	49	4	5	41
12	(Australia) Rebels	18	5	0	11	2	382	515	−133	44	65	4	5	37
13	(Australia) Force	18	4	1	11	2	267	366	−99	26	34	0	5	31
14	(New Zealand) Highlanders	18	3	0	13	2	374	496	−122	40	55	4	5	29
15	(South Africa) Southern Kings	18	3	1	12	2	298	564	−266	27	69	2	0	24

Source: sanzarrugby.com

Legend:

Conference leaders, qualify to finals.
Wildcard teams, qualify to finals.
Qualifies to relegation play-offs.

- Rnd = Round completed (games played plus byes), W = Games won, D = Games drawn, L = Games lost, Bye = Number of byes, PF = Points for, PA = Points against, PD = Points difference, TF = Tries for, TA = Tries against, TB = Try bonus points, LB = Losing bonus points, Pts = Log points, Q = Qualification

Points breakdown:

- 4 points for a win
- 2 points for a draw
- 4 points for a bye (this does not apply to teams not scheduled to play in split rounds, e.g. New Zealand and South African teams in the Australian-only Round 1).
- 1 bonus point for a loss by seven points or less
- 1 bonus point for scoring four or more tries in a match

The overall standings classification system:

- Three conference winners/leaders in log points order
- Three wildcard teams in log points order
- The remaining nine teams in log points order
- When teams are level on log points, they are sorted by:
  - number of games won
  - overall points difference
  - number of tries scored
  - overall try difference

=== Round-by-round ===
Team progression – 2013 Super Rugby season
Team	R1	R2	R3	R4	R5	R6	R7	R8	R9	R10	R11	R12	R13	R14	R15	R16	R17	R18	R19	R20
Chiefs	—N/a	5 (4th)	10 (2nd)	12 (3rd)	17 (2nd)	21 (2nd)	25 (2nd)	29 (1st)	29 (2nd)	30 (5th)	35 (2nd)	40 (2nd)	44 (2nd)	48 (1st)	52 (1st)	56 (1st)	56 (2nd)	61 (1st)	61 (2nd)	66 (1st)
Bulls	—N/a	4 (5th)	9 (3rd)	13 (2nd)	13 (3rd)	14 (7th)	15 (10th)	19 (9th)	23 (7th)	28 (3rd)	32 (3rd)	37 (3rd)	41 (3rd)	46 (2nd)	50 (2nd)	54 (2nd)	54 (3rd)	59 (2nd)	63 (1st)	63 (2nd)
Brumbies	4 (1st)	9 (1st)	13 (1st)	18 (1st)	23 (1st)	23 (1st)	27 (1st)	29 (2nd)	33 (1st)	35 (1st)	40 (1st)	41 (1st)	45 (1st)	46 (3rd)	50 (3rd)	54 (3rd)	59 (1st)	59 (3rd)	59 (3rd)	60 (3rd)
Crusaders	—N/a	4 (9th)	4 (11th)	6 (9th)	11 (7th)	16 (5th)	20 (5th)	21 (8th)	22 (9th)	26 (9th)	30 (7th)	34 (7th)	38 (6th)	42 (5th)	42 (6th)	46 (6th)	46 (6th)	51 (5th)	56 (4th)	60 (4th)
Reds	0 (15th)	4 (8th)	8 (6th)	12 (5th)	13 (5th)	17 (4th)	22 (4th)	26 (4th)	31 (4th)	33 (4th)	37 (4th)	39 (4th)	44 (4th)	44 (4th)	45 (5th)	50 (4th)	54 (4th)	54 (4th)	54 (5th)	58 (5th)
Cheetahs	—N/a	1 (11th)	1 (15th)	5 (13th)	9 (9th)	13 (9th)	18 (6th)	22 (6th)	23 (6th)	27 (6th)	31 (6th)	35 (6th)	36 (7th)	40 (7th)	45 (4th)	46 (6th)	46 (5th)	46 (6th)	50 (6th)	54 (6th)
Stormers	—N/a	0 (13th)	1 (12th)	5 (10th)	9 (10th)	14 (8th)	15 (11th)	16 (11th)	20 (11th)	24 (11th)	28 (10th)	29 (10th)	30 (10th)	30 (11th)	34 (11th)	38 (11th)	38 (11th)	42 (10th)	46 (7th)	50 (7th)
Sharks	—N/a	4 (6th)	8 (5th)	12 (4th)	12 (6th)	17 (3rd)	21 (3rd)	25 (3rd)	26 (3rd)	27 (7th)	28 (8th)	29 (9th)	29 (11th)	33 (10th)	34 (11th)	38 (10th)	38 (10th)	42 (9th)	43 (10th)	48 (8th)
Waratahs	4 (5th)	4 (10th)	8 (8th)	8 (8th)	9 (13th)	13 (11th)	17 (8th)	17 (10th)	21 (10th)	25 (10th)	25 (11th)	30 (8th)	34 (8th)	38 (8th)	39 (8th)	40 (8th)	44 (7th)	44 (7th)	44 (8th)	45 (9th)
Blues	—N/a	5 (2nd)	10 (4th)	11 (6th)	15 (4th)	16 (6th)	17 (9th)	22 (7th)	27 (5th)	31 (2nd)	32 (5th)	36 (5th)	41 (5th)	41 (6th)	42 (7th)	43 (7th)	43 (8th)	44 (8th)	44 (9th)	44 (10th)
Hurricanes	—N/a	0 (15th)	1 (13th)	5 (11th)	9 (8th)	13 (10th)	18 (7th)	23 (5th)	23 (8th)	27 (8th)	28 (9th)	28 (11th)	33 (9th)	34 (9th)	38 (9th)	39 (9th)	39 (9th)	39 (11th)	41 (11th)	41 (11th)
Rebels	4 (4th)	4 (7th)	5 (9th)	5 (12th)	9 (12th)	9 (13th)	9 (13th)	14 (12th)	15 (14th)	19 (12th)	20 (12th)	22 (12th)	24 (12th)	28 (12th)	32 (12th)	32 (12th)	32 (12th)	32 (12th)	32 (12th)	37 (12th)
Force	1 (6th)	1 (12th)	1 (14th)	5 (14th)	9 (11th)	9 (12th)	10 (12th)	11 (13th)	15 (12th)	16 (13th)	16 (13th)	18 (13th)	19 (14th)	19 (14th)	23 (14th)	27 (13th)	27 (13th)	27 (13th)	27 (13th)	31 (13th)
Highlanders	—N/a	0 (14th)	4 (10th)	4 (15th)	5 (15th)	5 (15th)	6 (15th)	6 (15th)	6 (15th)	6 (15th)	10 (15th)	14 (15th)	16 (15th)	16 (15th)	17 (15th)	22 (15th)	22 (15th)	22 (15th)	27 (14th)	29 (14th)
Southern Kings	—N/a	4 (3rd)	8 (7th)	8 (7th)	8 (14th)	8 (14th)	8 (14th)	11 (14th)	15 (13th)	15 (14th)	15 (14th)	15 (14th)	20 (13th)	24 (13th)	24 (13th)	24 (14th)	24 (14th)	24 (14th)	24 (15th)	24 (15th)
The table above shows a team's progression throughout the season. For each round, their cumulative points total is shown with the overall log position in brackets. Note: Due to the Lions tour, only Australian teams will play in Rounds 1 and 17 and only New Zealand and South African teams in Rounds 18 and 19. Therefore, until the completion of Round 19, Australian teams will have played more games and will be in an artificially higher position.
Key:	Win	Draw	Loss	Bye	No game															

== Regular season ==
=== Round 1 ===
15 February 2013	Rebels	30–23	Force	AAMI Park, Melbourne
19:40	Try: Ged Robinson 33'; Hugh Pyle 46'; Richard Kingi 63'; Con: James O'Connor (3/3) 34', 47', 64'; Pen: James O'Connor (3/3) 38', 53', 75'; Cards: Scott Higginbotham (yellow card) 22'	Scoreboard	Try: Alfie Mafi (2) 27', 50'; Richard Brown 67'; Con: Kyle Godwin (1/3) 71'; Pen: Kyle Godwin (2/3) 6', 23'; Cards: Chris Alcock (yellow card) 58'; Alby Mathewson (yellow card) 62'	Attendance: 11,902; Referee: Angus Gardner (Australia)

16 February 2013	Brumbies	24–6	Reds	Canberra Stadium, Canberra
19:40	Try: Jesse Mogg (2) 9', 80'; Con: Christian Lealiifano (0/1); Ian Prior (1/1) 80+1'; Pen: Christian Lealiifano (0/2); Nic White (2/3) 37', 75'; Jesse Mogg (2/3) 51', 58'	Scoreboard	Pen: Mike Harris (2/5) 3', 25'	Attendance: 17,058; Referee: Andrew Lees (Australia)

Bye/s: Waratahs. No games: Blues, Bulls, Cheetahs, Chiefs, Crusaders, Highlanders, Hurricanes, Southern Kings, Sharks, Stormers

=== Round 2 ===
22 February 2013	Highlanders	27–41	Chiefs	Forsyth Barr Stadium, Dunedin
19:35	Try: Ben Smith 12'; Hosea Gear 38'; Kade Poki 48'; Con: Lima Sopoaga (3/3) 13', 39', 49'; Pen: Lima Sopoaga (2/3) 44', 57'	Scoreboard	Try: Tim Nanai-Williams (2) 15', 65'; Patrick Osborne 46'; Asaeli Tikoirotuma 61'; Con: Gareth Anscombe (3/4) 16', 62', 66'; Pen: Gareth Anscombe (5/5) 4', 21', 25', 70', 74'	Attendance: 17,611; Referee: Steve Walsh (Australia)

22 February 2013	Rebels	13–30	Brumbies	AAMI Park, Melbourne
19:40	Try: Scott Higginbotham 18'; Con: James O'Connor (1/1) 18'; Pen: James O'Connor (2/4) 14', 33'; Cards: Jarrod Saffy (yellow card) 69'	Scoreboard	Try: Jesse Mogg 4'; Clyde Rathbone 35'; Ben Mowen 61'; Robbie Coleman 74'; Con: Christian Lealiifano (2/4) 5', 62'; Pen: Christian Lealiifano (2/2) 44', 56'	Attendance: 12,092; Referee: James Leckie (Australia)

22 February 2013	Bulls	25–17	Stormers	Loftus Versfeld, Pretoria
19:10	Try: Chiliboy Ralepelle 68'; Con: Morné Steyn (1/1) 68'; Pen: Morné Steyn (6/6) 6', 27', 34', 46', 57', 61'	Scoreboard	Try: Jean de Villiers 50'; Andries Bekker 77'; Con: Joe Pietersen (2/2) 51', 78'; Pen: Elton Jantjies (0/4); Joe Pietersen (1/1) 54'	Attendance: 44,772; Referee: Jaco Peyper (South Africa)

23 February 2013	Hurricanes	20–34	Blues	Westpac Stadium, Wellington
19:35	Try: Julian Savea 25'; Penalty try 55'; Con: Beauden Barrett (2/2) 26', 55'; Pen: Beauden Barrett (2/2) 8', 18'	Scoreboard	Try: Frank Halai (2) 20', 75'; Charles Piutau 48'; Rene Ranger 70'; Con: Piri Weepu (1/4) 76'; Pen: Piri Weepu (4/5) 4', 40', 60', 80'; Cards: Frank Halai (yellow card) 55'	Attendance: 10,672; Referee: Glen Jackson (New Zealand)

23 February 2013	Reds	25–17	Waratahs	Suncorp Stadium, Brisbane
18:40	Try: Dom Shipperley 6'; Ben Tapuai (2) 10', 74'; Con: Mike Harris (2/3) 7', 11'; Pen: Mike Harris (2/3) 15', 69'	Scoreboard	Try: Israel Folau 47'; Ben Volavola 59'; Con: Bernard Foley (2/2) 48', 60'; Pen: Brendan McKibbin (1/3) 3'	Attendance: 35,801; Referee: Chris Pollock (New Zealand)

23 February 2013	Cheetahs	22–29	Sharks	Free State Stadium, Bloemfontein
17:05	Try: Philip van der Walt 10'; Lappies Labuschagné 59'; Johann Sadie 63'; Con: Johan Goosen (2/3) 60', 64'; Pen: Johan Goosen (1/3) 67'	Scoreboard	Try: Lwazi Mvovo 29'; Marcell Coetzee 46'; Con: Patrick Lambie (2/2) 30', 47'; Pen: Patrick Lambie (5/5) 21', 26', 28', 50', 77'	Attendance: 20,412; Referee: Jonathan Kaplan (South Africa)

23 February 2013	Southern Kings	22–10	Force	Nelson Mandela Bay Stadium, Port Elizabeth
19:10	Try: Sergeal Petersen (2) 14', 59'; Con: Demetri Catrakilis (0/2); Pen: Demetri Catrakilis (4/5) 44', 52', 65', 70'	Scoreboard	Try: Alfie Mafi 28'; Pekahou Cowan 24'; Con: Kyle Godwin (0/1); Sam Christie (0/1); Pen: Kyle Godwin (0/1); Cards: Hugh McMeniman (yellow card) 53'	Attendance: 31,882; Referee: Lourens van der Merwe (South Africa)

Bye/s: Crusaders

=== Round 3 ===
1 March 2013	Blues	34–15	Crusaders	Eden Park, Auckland
19:30	Try: Steve Luatua 10'; Frank Halai (2) 28', 34'; Luke Braid 58'; George Moala 74'; Con: Piri Weepu (1/3) 35'; Chris Noakes (1/1) 59'; Baden Kerr (1/1) 75'; Pen: Piri Weepu (1/3) 26'	Scoreboard	Pen: Dan Carter (5/5) 4', 24', 37', 40', 45'	Attendance: 31,014; Referee: Chris Pollock (New Zealand)

1 March 2013	Waratahs	31–26	Rebels	Allianz Stadium, Sydney
19:20	Try: Bernard Foley 58'; Michael Hooper 66'; Paddy Ryan 75'; Con: Brendan McKibbin (2/2) 59', 67'; Bernard Foley (0/1); Pen: Brendan McKibbin (4/5) 3', 29', 52', 72'; Cards: Tatafu Polota-Nau (yellow card) 24'	Scoreboard	Try: Ged Robinson 25'; Kurtley Beale 80'; Con: James O'Connor (2/2) 26', 80'; Pen: James O'Connor (4/5) 8', 19', 37', 69'; Cards: Laurie Weeks (yellow card) 48'	Attendance: 11,206; Referee: Steve Walsh (Australia)

1 March 2013	Reds	18–12	Hurricanes	Suncorp Stadium, Brisbane
20:20	Try: Digby Ioane 23'; Rob Simmons 49'; Con: Quade Cooper (1/2) 50'; Pen: Quade Cooper (2/2) 4', 9'	Scoreboard	Pen: Beauden Barrett (4/7) 2', 11', 21', 56'; Drop: Beauden Barrett (0/1)	Attendance: 30,905; Referee: Rohan Hoffmann (Australia)

2 March 2013	Chiefs	45–3	Cheetahs	Waikato Stadium, Hamilton
19:35	Try: Liam Messam 25'; Ben Afeaki 42'; Asaeli Tikoirotuma 64'; Gareth Anscombe 67'; Rhys Marshall 73'; Ben Tameifuna 79'; Con: Gareth Anscombe (6/6) 26', 43', 65', 68', 74', 80'; Pen: Gareth Anscombe (1/1) 18'	Scoreboard	Pen: Johan Goosen (1/4) 15'	Attendance: 11,893; Referee: Mike Fraser (New Zealand)

2 March 2013	Bulls	36–26	Force	Loftus Versfeld, Pretoria
17:05	Try: Morné Steyn 2'; Sampie Mastriet 44'; Jean Cook 71'; Werner Kruger 80'; Con: Morné Steyn (2/4) 73', 80'; Pen: Morné Steyn (4/4) 18', 34', 40', 69'	Scoreboard	Try: Angus Cottrell 47'; Toby Lynn 56'; Con: Sias Ebersohn (2/2) 48', 57'; Pen: Sias Ebersohn (2/2) 27', 30'; Drop: Sias Ebersohn (2/3) 10', 42'	Attendance: 25,185; Referee: Jason Jaftha (South Africa)

2 March 2013	Sharks	12–6	Stormers	Kings Park Stadium, Durban
19:10	Pen: Patrick Lambie (4/5) 42', 53', 55', 60'; François Steyn (0/1)	Scoreboard	Pen: Joe Pietersen (2/2) 45', 58'; Drop: Elton Jantjies (0/1)	Attendance: 25,428; Referee: Jonathan Kaplan (South Africa)

Bye/s: Brumbies, Highlanders, Southern Kings

=== Round 4 ===
8 March 2013	Hurricanes	29–28	Crusaders	Westpac Stadium, Wellington
19:35	Try: Julian Savea 55'; Alapati Leiua 73'; Con: Beauden Barrett (2/2) 56', 74'; Pen: Beauden Barrett (5/5) 7', 33', 36', 39', 68'	Scoreboard	Try: Ryan Crotty 25'; Corey Flynn 46'; Israel Dagg 51'; Dan Carter 60'; Con: Dan Carter (4/4) 26', 47', 52', 61'; Drop: Dan Carter (0/1)	Attendance: 12,891; Referee: Andrew Lees (Australia)

8 March 2013	Rebels	13–23	Reds	AAMI Park, Melbourne
19:40	Try: Lachlan Mitchell 40'; Con: James O'Connor (1/1) 40'; Pen: James O'Connor (2/5) 5', 28'	Scoreboard	Try: Ben Tapuai 16'; Nick Frisby 41'; Con: Quade Cooper 17', 42'; Pen: Quade Cooper (3/4) 3', 59', 79'	Attendance: 13,179; Referee: Francisco Pastrana (Argentina)

9 March 2013	Highlanders	19–36	Cheetahs	Rugby Park, Invercargill
19:35	Try: Kade Poki (3) 26', 44', 72'; Con: Lima Sopoaga (1/1) 27'; Colin Slade (1/2) 73'; Pen: Lima Sopoaga (0/1)	Scoreboard	Try: Sarel Pretorius (2) 20', 34'; Robert Ebersohn 30'; Con: Johan Goosen (3/3) 21', 31', 35'; Pen: Johan Goosen (5/5) 10', 24', 32', 66', 75'	Attendance: 7,852; Referee: Nick Briant (New Zealand)

9 March 2013	Brumbies	35–6	Waratahs	Canberra Stadium, Canberra
19:40	Try: Ben Mowen 25'; Christian Lealiifano 33'; Henry Speight 72'; Robbie Coleman 78'; Con: Christian Lealiifano (2/3) 34', 73'; Ian Prior (1/1) 79'; Pen: Christian Lealiifano (3/3) 3', 7', 10'; Cards: Sam Carter (yellow card) 40'; Ben Alexander (yellow card) 70'	Scoreboard	Pen: Brendan McKibbin (2/2) 15', 40'; Cards: Benn Robinson (yellow card) 70'	Attendance: 20,027; Referee: Jonathon White (New Zealand)

9 March 2013	Stormers	36–34	Chiefs	DHL Newlands Stadium, Cape Town
17:05	Try: Gio Aplon (2) 7', 38'; Nic Groom 52'; Con: Joe Pietersen (3/3) 8', 39', 53'; Pen: Joe Pietersen (5/5) 3', 15', 26', 33', 60'	Scoreboard	Try: Charlie Ngatai (2) 16', 56'; Tim Nanai-Williams 36'; Andrew Horrell 71'; Con: Gareth Anscombe (4/4) 17', 37', 57', 72'; Pen: Gareth Anscombe (2/3) 11', 46'; Cards: Tawera Kerr-Barlow (yellow card) 32'; Nick Crosswell (yellow card) 75'	Attendance: 37,178; Referee: Jaco Peyper (South Africa)

9 March 2013	Southern Kings	12–21	Sharks	Nelson Mandela Bay Stadium, Port Elizabeth
19:10	Pen: Demetri Catrakilis (4/4) 31', 57', 63', 71'	Scoreboard	Pen: Patrick Lambie (6/6) 6', 14', 25', 54', 61', 80'; Drop: Patrick Lambie (1/1) 40'	Attendance: 42,000; Referee: Jason Jaftha (South Africa)

10 March 2013	Blues	21–28	Bulls	Eden Park, Auckland
16:05	Try: Charles Piutau 53'; Rene Ranger 76'; Con: Baden Kerr (1/1) 54'; Marty McKenzie (0/1); Pen: Baden Kerr (3/4) 3', 13', 44'	Scoreboard	Try: Lionel Mapoe 18'; Akona Ndungane 23'; Arno Botha 56'; Con: Morné Steyn (2/3) 19', 57'; Pen: Morné Steyn (3/4) 6', 62', 80'; Drop: Morné Steyn (0/1)	Attendance: 25,112; Referee: Garratt Williamson (New Zealand)

Bye/s: Force

=== Round 5 ===
15 March 2013	Highlanders	19–23	Hurricanes	Forsyth Barr Stadium, Dunedin
19:35	Try: Hosea Gear 36'; Con: Colin Slade (1/1) 37'; Pen: Colin Slade (4/5) 16', 29', 47', 58'	Scoreboard	Try: Conrad Smith 8'; Ben Franks 32'; TJ Perenara 49'; Con: Beauden Barrett (1/3) 33'; Pen: Beauden Barrett (2/2) 66', 71'	Attendance: 14,339; Referee: Francisco Pastrana (Argentina)

15 March 2013	Waratahs	26–27	Cheetahs	Allianz Stadium, Sydney
19:40	Try: Peter Betham 26'; Adam Ashley-Cooper 40'; Con: Brendan McKibbin (2/2) 27', 40'; Pen: Brendan McKibbin (4/6) 4', 13', 61', 73'	Scoreboard	Try: Robert Ebersohn 1'; Raymond Rhule (2) 17', 69'; Con: Johan Goosen (3/3) 2', 18', 70'; Pen: Johan Goosen (2/3) 33', 50'	Attendance: 12,263; Referee: Garratt Williamson (New Zealand)

15 March 2013	Southern Kings	24–35	Chiefs	Nelson Mandela Bay Stadium, Port Elizabeth
19:10	Try: Sergeal Petersen 39'; Jacques Engelbrecht 61'; Con: Demetri Catrakilis (1/2) 40'; Pen: Demetri Catrakilis (4/4) 14', 28', 66', 72'	Scoreboard	Try: Lelia Masaga (3) 20', 31', 53'; Sam Cane 50'; Con: Gareth Anscombe (3/4) 21', 51', 54'; Pen: Gareth Anscombe (3/4) 10', 17', 79'; Cards: Augustine Pulu (yellow card) 60'	Attendance: 31,803; Referee: Stuart Berry (South Africa)

16 March 2013	Crusaders	41–19	Bulls	AMI Stadium, Christchurch
19:35	Try: Robbie Fruean 25'; Kieran Read 30'; Johnny McNicholl 40'; Tom Marshall 45'; Wyatt Crockett 61'; Willi Heinz 78'; Con: Dan Carter (4/6) 27', 44', 46', 80'; Pen: Dan Carter (1/1) 7'	Scoreboard	Try: Deon Stegmann 67'; Con: Morné Steyn (1/1) 68'; Pen: Morné Steyn (4/4) 21', 34', 38', 42'	Attendance: 14,400; Referee: Chris Pollock (New Zealand)

16 March 2013	Reds	12–19	Force	Suncorp Stadium, Brisbane
18:40	Pen: Quade Cooper (4/5) 17', 20', 30', 38'; Cards: Eddie Quirk (yellow card) 56'	Scoreboard	Try: Alfie Mafi 31'; Con: Sias Ebersohn (1/1) 32'; Pen: Sias Ebersohn (4/5) 3', 22', 57', 69'	Attendance: 26,709; Referee: Angus Gardner (Australia)

16 March 2013	Sharks	10–29	Brumbies	Kings Park Stadium, Durban
17:05	Try: Ryan Kankowski 52'; Con: Patrick Lambie (1/1) 53'; Pen: Patrick Lambie (1/1) 19'	Scoreboard	Try: Jesse Mogg 5'; Joe Tomane 12'; Matt To'omua 23'; Henry Speight 35'; Con: Christian Lealiifano (3/4) 6', 24', 36'; Pen: Christian Lealiifano (1/1) 68'	Attendance: 23,894; Referee: Jonathan Kaplan (South Africa)

Bye/s: Blues, Rebels, Stormers

=== Round 6 ===
22 March 2013	Chiefs	19–7	Highlanders	Waikato Stadium, Hamilton
19:35	Try: Tim Nanai-Williams 8'; Con: Gareth Anscombe (1/1) 9'; Pen: Gareth Anscombe (4/7) 3', 25', 61', 69'	Scoreboard	Try: Aaron Smith 20'; Con: Colin Slade (1/1) 21'; Pen: Colin Slade (0/3); Cards: Jarrad Hoeata (yellow card) 23'	Attendance: 14,823; Referee: Jonathon White (New Zealand)

23 March 2013	Crusaders	55–20	Southern Kings	AMI Stadium, Christchurch
19:35	Try: George Whitelock (3) 4', 24', 75'; Wyatt Crockett 13'; Willi Heinz 31'; Matt Todd 47'; Luke Whitelock 56'; Con: Dan Carter (5/5) 5', 14', 25', 32', 48'; Tyler Bleyendaal (2/2) 56', 76'; Pen: Dan Carter (2/2) 9', 43'	Scoreboard	Try: Wimpie van der Walt 40'; George Whitehead 79'; Con: Demetri Catrakilis (1/1) 40'; George Whitehead (1/1) 80'; Pen: Demetri Catrakilis (2/3) 2', 21'	Attendance: 13,515; Referee: Rohan Hoffmann (Australia)

23 March 2013	Reds	23–18	Bulls	Suncorp Stadium, Brisbane
18:40	Try: Jono Lance 36'; Quade Cooper 53'; Con: Quade Cooper (2/2) 37', 54'; Pen: Quade Cooper (3/5) 8', 34', 59'; Cards: Jono Lance (yellow card) 10'	Scoreboard	Pen: Louis Fouche (5/6) 11', 15', 43', 45', 49'; Morné Steyn (1/1) 71'; Cards: Lionel Mapoe (yellow card) 52'	Attendance: 28,399; Referee: James Leckie (Australia)

23 March 2013	Force	10–19	Cheetahs	nib Stadium, Perth
18:45	Try: Winston Stanley 27'; Con: Sias Ebersohn (1/1) 28'; Pen: Sias Ebersohn (0/2); Jayden Hayward (1/2) 59'; Drop: Kyle Godwin (0/1)	Scoreboard	Try: Willie le Roux 77'; Con: Riaan Smit (1/1) 78'; Pen: Riaan Smit (4/4) 25', 34', 70', 72'	Attendance: 12,784; Referee: Garratt Williamson (New Zealand)

23 March 2013	Sharks	64–7	Rebels	Kings Park Stadium, Durban
17:05	Try: Louis Ludik (2) 7', 55'; Marcell Coetzee 23'; Jacques Botes 31'; Keegan Daniel 35'; Kyle Cooper 41'; Cobus Reinach 45'; Tendai Mtawarira 49'; Ryan Kankowski 51'; Riaan Viljoen 59'; Con: Patrick Lambie (2/4) 8', 24'; Meyer Bosman (5/6) 42', 46', 49', 52', 56'; Pen: Patrick Lambie (0/2); Cards: Cobus Reinach (yellow card) 27'	Scoreboard	Try: Scott Higginbotham 68'; Con: James O'Connor (1/1) 69'; Cards: James O'Connor (yellow card) 58'	Attendance: 20,147; Referee: Lourens van der Merwe (South Africa)

23 March 2013	Stormers	35–22	Brumbies	DHL Newlands Stadium, Cape Town
19:10	Try: Gio Aplon 11'; Andries Bekker (2) 22', 38'; Gerhard van den Heever 74'; Con: Joe Pietersen (3/4) 12', 39', 75'; Pen: Joe Pietersen (3/4) 10', 57', 73'	Scoreboard	Try: Henry Speight 28'; Con: Christian Lealiifano (1/1) 29'; Pen: Christian Lealiifano (5/5) 17', 44', 50', 62', 70'	Attendance: 35,073; Referee: Glen Jackson (New Zealand)

24 March 2013	Waratahs	30–27	Blues	Allianz Stadium, Sydney
16:05	Try: Drew Mitchell 6'; Israel Folau 47'; Bernard Foley 64'; Con: Brendan McKibbin (1/1) 7'; Bernard Foley (2/2) 48', 65'; Pen: Brendan McKibbin (1/1) 22'; Bernard Foley (2/2) 70', 80+1'; Drop: Bernard Foley (0/1)	Scoreboard	Try: James Parsons 10'; Chris Noakes 28'; Charles Piutau 31'; Con: Chris Noakes (3/3) 11', 29', 32'; Pen: Chris Noakes (2/3) 2', 72'	Attendance: 16,429; Referee: Francisco Pastrana (Argentina)

Bye/s: Hurricanes

=== Round 7 ===
29 March 2013	Highlanders	33–34	Reds	Forsyth Barr Stadium, Dunedin
19:35	Try: Elliot Dixon 19'; Hosea Gear 61'; Ma'a Nonu 67'; Con: Colin Slade (1/1) 20'; Lima Sopoaga (2/2) 62', 68'; Pen: Colin Slade (3/4) 10', 16', 40'; Lima Sopoaga (1/1) 74'; Cards: Andrew Hore (yellow card) 28'	Scoreboard	Try: James Hanson 6'; Liam Gill 25'; Jake Schatz 30'; Will Genia 54'; Con: Quade Cooper (4/4) 7', 26', 31', 55'; Pen: Quade Cooper (2/4) 46', 71'	Attendance: 12,431; Referee: Jaco Peyper (South Africa)

30 March 2013	Hurricanes	46–30	Southern Kings	Westpac Stadium, Wellington
16:35	Try: Ben May 3'; Conrad Smith 19'; TJ Perenara 30'; Jeremy Thrush 39'; Brad Shields 65'; Alapati Leiua 73'; Con: Beauden Barrett (5/6) 4', 20', 40', 66', 75'; Pen: Beauden Barrett (2/3) 11', 73'; Drop: Tusi Pisi (0/1)	Scoreboard	Try: Steven Sykes 17'; Ronnie Cooke 49'; Hannes Franklin 76'; Con: Demetri Catrakilis (2/2) 18', 50'; George Whitehead (1/1) 76'; Pen: Demetri Catrakilis (3/4) 23', 27', 35'	Attendance: 15,103; Referee: Nick Briant (New Zealand)

30 March 2013	Chiefs	23–16	Blues	Baypark Stadium, Mount Maunganui
19:35	Try: Ben Tameifuna 47'; Richard Kahui 63'; Con: Gareth Anscombe (2/2) 48', 64'; Pen: Gareth Anscombe (3/4) 20', 27', 37'; Drop: Aaron Cruden (0/1); Cards: Bundee Aki (yellow card) 8'	Scoreboard	Try: George Moala 77'; Con: Baden Kerr (1/1) 78'; Pen: Chris Noakes (3/4) 15', 39', 53'	Attendance: 15,203; Referee: Jonathan Kaplan (South Africa)

30 March 2013	Brumbies	23–20	Bulls	Canberra Stadium, Canberra
19:40	Try: Robbie Coleman 40'; Con: Christian Lealiifano (0/1); Pen: Nic White (0/2); Christian Lealiifano (6/6) 19', 33', 37', 70', 74', 80+2'	Scoreboard	Try: Jurgen Visser 49'; JJ Engelbrecht 78'; Con: Morné Steyn (2/2) 50', 79'; Pen: Morné Steyn (2/3) 21', 54'; Cards: Morné Mellett (yellow card) 64'	Attendance: 13,735; Referee: Jonathon White (New Zealand)

30 March 2013	Cheetahs	34–16	Rebels	Free State Stadium, Bloemfontein
17:05	Try: Hennie Daniller 36'; Raymond Rhule 52'; Willie le Roux 65'; Johann Sadie 68'; Rayno Benjamin 73'; Con: Burton Francis (3/5) 37', 53', 69'; Pen: Burton Francis (1/2) 14'	Scoreboard	Try: Cadeyrn Neville 77'; Con: James O'Connor (1/1) 78'; Pen: James O'Connor (3/3) 23', 28', 58'; Cards: Luke Jones (yellow card) 67'	Attendance: 14,993; Referee: Glen Jackson (New Zealand)

30 March 2013	Stormers	14–19	Crusaders	DHL Newlands Stadium, Cape Town
19:10	Try: Siya Kolisi 15'; Con: Joe Pietersen (0/1); Pen: Joe Pietersen (3/3) 9', 23', 57'; Cards: Duane Vermeulen (yellow card) 54'	Scoreboard	Try: Matt Todd 26'; Con: Tyler Bleyendaal (1/1) 27'; Pen: Tyler Bleyendaal (4/5) 31', 38', 55', 70'	Attendance: 47,263; Referee: Craig Joubert (South Africa)

31 March 2013	Waratahs	23–19	Force	Allianz Stadium, Sydney
16:05	Try: Adam Ashley-Cooper 47'; Con: Brendan McKibbin (0/1); Pen: Brendan McKibbin (6/7) 11', 18', 22', 29', 33', 42'	Scoreboard	Try: Alfie Mafi 53'; Con: Sias Ebersohn (1/1) 54'; Pen: Sias Ebersohn (4/5) 5', 8', 36', 60'; Drop: Sias Ebersohn (0/1); Cards: Salesi Ma'afu (yellow card) 20'	Attendance: 15,348; Referee: Steve Walsh (Australia)

Bye/s: Sharks

=== Round 8 ===
5 April 2013	Blues	29–18	Highlanders	Eden Park, Auckland
19:35	Try: Steve Luatua 20'; Angus Ta'avao 28'; Piri Weepu (2) 59', 70'; Con: Chris Noakes (2/3) 29', 60'; Baden Kerr (1/1) 71'; Pen: Chris Noakes (1/3) 67'; Cards: George Moala (yellow card) 45'	Scoreboard	Try: Ben Smith 9'; Phil Burleigh 63'; Con: Colin Slade (1/2) 10'; Pen: Colin Slade (2/3) 3', 38'; Cards: Ma'a Nonu (yellow card) 19'	Attendance: 16,489; Referee: Steve Walsh (Australia)

5 April 2013	Brumbies	28–28	Southern Kings	Canberra Stadium, Canberra
19:40	Try: Henry Speight 12'; Joe Tomane 17'; Con: Christian Lealiifano (0/2); Pen: Christian Lealiifano (5/5) 4', 37', 51', 70', 78'; Nic White (1/3) 30'	Scoreboard	Try: Schalk Ferreira 22'; Wimpie van der Walt 33'; Cornell du Preez (2) 46', 80+3'; Con: George Whitehead (3/3) 23', 34', 47'; Demetri Catrakilis (1/1) 80+4'; Pen: George Whitehead (0/1); Cards: Schalk Ferreira (yellow card) 67'	Attendance: 12,063; Referee: Jaco Peyper (South Africa)

5 April 2013	Sharks	21–17	Crusaders	Kings Park Stadium, Durban
19:10	Pen: Patrick Lambie (7/7) 3', 13', 40', 55', 58', 69', 76'	Scoreboard	Try: Andy Ellis 18'; Con: Tyler Bleyendaal (0/1); Pen: Tyler Bleyendaal (4/7) 8', 37', 46', 62'	Attendance: 29,347; Referee: Lourens van der Merwe (South Africa)

6 April 2013	Hurricanes	41–29	Waratahs	Westpac Stadium, Wellington
19:35	Try: Julian Savea (2) 13', 55'; Reggie Goodes 44'; Motu Matu'u 52'; Con: Beauden Barrett (3/4) 14', 53', 56'; Pen: Beauden Barrett (5/6) 10', 20', 33', 40', 71'	Scoreboard	Try: Bernard Foley 21'; Adam Ashley-Cooper 62'; Israel Folau 74'; Con: Brendan McKibbin (1/1) 22'; Bernard Foley (0/2); Pen: Brendan McKibbin (4/4) 3', 16', 35', 50'	Attendance: 8,966; Referee: Jonathan Kaplan (South Africa)

6 April 2013	Force	23–30	Rebels	nib Stadium, Perth
16:40	Try: Winston Stanley 33'; Will Tupou 59'; Patrick Dellit 66'; Con: Sias Ebersohn (0/1); Kyle Godwin (1/2) 60'; Pen: Sias Ebersohn (2/4) 39', 40'	Scoreboard	Try: Hugh Pyle 8'; Jason Woodward (2) 18', 69'; Richard Kingi 49'; Con: James O'Connor (2/4) 19', 70'; Pen: James O'Connor (2/3) 13', 58'	Attendance: 15,673; Referee: Mike Fraser (New Zealand)

6 April 2013	Cheetahs	26–24	Stormers	Free State Stadium, Bloemfontein
17:05	Try: Robert Ebersohn 20'; Sarel Pretorius 48'; Con: Burton Francis (2/2) 21', 49'; Pen: Burton Francis (3/4) 45', 60', 80+4'; Drop: Burton Francis (1/2) 67'	Scoreboard	Try: Juan de Jongh (2) 32', 38'; Con: Joe Pietersen (1/2) 39'; Pen: Joe Pietersen (4/4) 9', 52', 55', 75'	Attendance: 25,163; Referee: Stuart Berry (South Africa)

Bye/s: Bulls, Chiefs, Reds

=== Round 9 ===
12 April 2013	Highlanders	19–30	Brumbies	Forsyth Barr Stadium, Dunedin
19:35	Try: Aaron Smith 75'; Con: Hayden Parker (1/1) 76'; Pen: Hayden Parker (4/4) 11', 16', 23', 40'	Scoreboard	Try: Henry Speight 3'; George Smith 31'; Joe Tomane 54'; Con: Christian Lealiifano (3/3) 4', 32', 55'; Pen: Christian Lealiifano (2/3) 6', 48'; Nic White (1/2) 44'	Attendance: 11,835; Referee: Chris Pollock (New Zealand)

13 April 2013	Chiefs	23–31	Reds	Waikato Stadium, Hamilton
16:35	Try: Bundee Aki 21'; Patrick Osborne 66'; Con: Gareth Anscombe (2/2) 22', 67'; Pen: Gareth Anscombe (3/4) 16', 43', 57'	Scoreboard	Try: Rodney Davies (2) 6', 52'; Jake Schatz 27'; Quade Cooper 46'; Con: Quade Cooper (4/4) 7', 28', 47', 53'; Pen: Quade Cooper (1/3) 60'; Cards: Anthony Fainga'a (yellow card) 65'	Attendance: 16,428; Referee: Steve Walsh (Australia)

13 April 2013	Blues	28–6	Hurricanes	Eden Park, Auckland
19:35	Try: Frank Halai 12'; Charles Piutau 39'; James Parsons 45'; Tom McCartney 61'; Con: Chris Noakes (4/4) 12', 40', 45', 61'	Scoreboard	Pen: Beauden Barrett (1/1) 33'; Drop: Tusi Pisi (1/1) 27'	Attendance: 23,387; Referee: Jaco Peyper (South Africa)

13 April 2013	Rebels	27–30	Southern Kings	AAMI Park, Melbourne
19:40	Try: Ged Robinson 25'; Angus Roberts 39'; Mitch Inman 52'; Con: James O'Connor (3/3) 26', 40', 53'; Pen: James O'Connor (2/3) 32', 46'; Cards: Jordy Reid (yellow card) 76'	Scoreboard	Try: Ronnie Cooke 9'; Shaun Venter 14'; Wimpie van der Walt 76'; Con: Demetri Catrakilis (3/3) 10', 15', 77'; Pen: Demetri Catrakilis (2/3) 34', 56'; Drop: Demetri Catrakilis (1/1) 80+3'	Attendance: 13,486; Referee: Andrew Lees (Australia)

13 April 2013	Force	16–14	Crusaders	nib Stadium, Perth
19:45	Try: Sam Norton-Knight 3'; Con: Jayden Hayward (1/1) 4'; Pen: Jayden Hayward (3/4) 12', 25', 32'	Scoreboard	Try: Luke Romano 21'; Con: Tyler Bleyendaal (0/1); Pen: Tyler Bleyendaal (3/3) 18', 49', 58'	Attendance: 16,758; Referee: Jonathan Kaplan (South Africa)

13 April 2013	Stormers	22–15	Sharks	DHL Newlands Stadium, Cape Town
17:05	Try: Juan de Jongh 35'; Con: Joe Pietersen (1/1) 36'; Pen: Joe Pietersen (5/5) 5', 13', 18', 56', 74'; Drop: Joe Pietersen (0/1)	Scoreboard	Pen: Patrick Lambie (5/6) 28', 39', 49', 62', 80+2'	Attendance: 49,262; Referee: Craig Joubert (South Africa)

13 April 2013	Bulls	26–20	Cheetahs	Loftus Versfeld, Pretoria
19:10	Try: Jano Vermaak 43'; Callie Visagie 76'; Con: Morné Steyn (2/2) 44', 77'; Pen: Morné Steyn (4/4) 29', 32', 46', 55'; Drop: Morné Steyn (0/1)	Scoreboard	Try: Trevor Nyakane 73'; Con: Burton Francis (0/1); Pen: Burton Francis (4/5) 7', 26', 38', 50'; Francois Brummer (1/1) 80+1'; Drop: Burton Francis (0/1)	Attendance: 35,000; Referee: Jason Jaftha (South Africa)

Bye/s: Waratahs

=== Round 10 ===
19 April 2013	Hurricanes	22–16	Force	Westpac Stadium, Wellington
19:35	Try: Jeffery Toomaga-Allen 20'; Brad Shields 29'; Tusi Pisi 49'; Con: Beauden Barrett (2/3) 21', 50'; Pen: Beauden Barrett (1/3) 11'; Cards: James Broadhurst (yellow card) 72'	Scoreboard	Try: Alby Mathewson 58'; Con: Jayden Hayward (1/1) 59'; Pen: Jayden Hayward (3/4) 28', 47', 73'	Attendance: 7,783; Referee: Nick Briant (New Zealand)

19 April 2013	Waratahs	25–20	Chiefs	Allianz Stadium, Sydney
19:40	Try: Cam Crawford 15'; Israel Folau 38'; John Ulugia 77'; Con: Brendan McKibbin (2/3) 39', 78'; Pen: Brendan McKibbin (2/4) 3', 51'; Cards: Sitaleki Timani (yellow card) 43'	Scoreboard	Try: Gareth Anscombe 47'; Ben Tameifuna 72'; Con: Gareth Anscombe (2/2) 48', 73'; Pen: Gareth Anscombe (2/4) 56', 62'; Charlie Ngatai (0/1)	Attendance: 15,451; Referee: Craig Joubert (South Africa)

20 April 2013	Crusaders	24–8	Highlanders	AMI Stadium, Christchurch
19:35	Try: Robbie Fruean 39'; Tom Taylor 76'; Con: Tyler Bleyendaal (1/2) 40'; Pen: Tyler Bleyendaal (4/5) 15', 29', 31', 53'; Cards: Owen Franks (yellow card) 12'	Scoreboard	Try: Jason Emery 45'; Con: Hayden Parker (0/1); Pen: Hayden Parker (0/1); Colin Slade (1/1) 64'	Attendance: 15,000; Referee: Garratt Williamson (New Zealand)

20 April 2013	Reds	19–19	Brumbies	Suncorp Stadium, Brisbane
19:40	Try: Jake Schatz 14'; Rodney Davies 49'; Liam Gill 75'; Con: Quade Cooper (2/3) 15', 76'	Scoreboard	Try: Christian Lealiifano 24'; Con: Christian Lealiifano (1/1) 25'; Pen: Christian Lealiifano (4/4) 5', 10', 53', 59'; Nic White (0/2); Cards: Christian Lealiifano (yellow card) 29'; Scott Sio (yellow card) 69'	Attendance: 38,404; Referee: Glen Jackson (New Zealand)

20 April 2013	Sharks	6–12	Cheetahs	Kings Park Stadium, Durban
17:05	Pen: Patrick Lambie (2/2) 40', 65'	Scoreboard	Try: Raymond Rhule 32'; Willie le Roux 78'; Con: Burton Francis (1/2) 33'; Pen: Burton Francis (0/1)	Attendance: 10,652; Referee: Jonathon White (New Zealand)

20 April 2013	Southern Kings	0–34	Bulls	Nelson Mandela Bay Stadium, Port Elizabeth
19:10		Scoreboard	Try: Jan Serfontein 5'; Jano Vermaak 23'; Jacques Potgieter 76'; Akona Ndungane 80'; Con: Morné Steyn (2/2) 6', 24'; Louis Fouché (2/2) 77', 80+1'; Pen: Morné Steyn (1/2) 21'; Drop: Morné Steyn (1/1) 34'; Pierre Spies (0/1)	Attendance: 45,649; Referee: Francisco Pastrana (Argentina)

Bye/s: Blues, Rebels, Stormers

=== Round 11 ===
26 April 2013	Hurricanes	16–18	Stormers	Central Energy Trust Arena, Palmerston North
19:35	Try: Matt Proctor 40'; Andre Taylor 59'; Con: Beauden Barrett (0/2); Pen: Beauden Barrett (2/4) 3', 26'; Cards: Jeremy Thrush (yellow card) 29'	Scoreboard	Try: Michael Rhodes 32'; Gio Aplon 63'; Con: Joe Pietersen (1/2) 33'; Pen: Joe Pietersen (2/3) 45', 53'	Attendance: 10,000 (estimated); Referee: Steve Walsh (Australia)

26 April 2013	Reds	12–11	Blues	Suncorp Stadium, Brisbane
19:40	Pen: Quade Cooper (4/5) 11', 16', 29', 74'	Scoreboard	Try: Jackson Willison 31'; Con: Chris Noakes (0/1); Pen: Chris Noakes (1/1) 13'; Albert Nikoro (1/2) 26'	Attendance: 31,050; Referee: Craig Joubert (South Africa)

27 April 2013	Chiefs	37–29	Sharks	Waikato Stadium, Hamilton
19:35	Try: Asaeli Tikoirotuma 9'; Bundee Aki 12'; Tim Nanai-Williams (2) 16', 47'; Con: Gareth Anscombe (4/4) 10', 13', 17', 47'; Pen: Gareth Anscombe (2/2) 7', 53'; Aaron Cruden (1/1) 80+1'	Scoreboard	Try: Derick Minnie (2) 22', 38'; Tera Mtembu 33'; Keegan Daniel 60'; Con: Patrick Lambie (3/4) 23', 39', 61'; Pen: Patrick Lambie (1/2) 79'	Attendance: 11,713; Referee: Chris Pollock (New Zealand)

27 April 2013	Brumbies	41–7	Force	Canberra Stadium, Canberra
19:40	Try: Jesse Mogg 5'; Henry Speight (2) 17', 39'; Tevita Kuridrani 25'; Joe Tomane 51'; Siliva Siliva 68'; Con: Christian Lealiifano (4/6) 18', 26', 40', 52'; Pen: Christian Lealiifano (1/1) 21'; Cards: Stephen Moore (yellow card) 44'	Scoreboard	Try: Matt Hodgson 74'; Con: Jayden Hayward (1/1) 75'	Attendance: 12,517; Referee: Angus Gardner (Australia)

27 April 2013	Bulls	30–19	Waratahs	Loftus Versfeld, Pretoria
17:05	Try: Francois Hougaard 67'; Morné Steyn 80'; Con: Morné Steyn (1/2) 68'; Pen: Morné Steyn (6/7) 2', 9', 19', 40', 58', 70'	Scoreboard	Try: Israel Folau 34'; Paddy Ryan 44'; Bernard Foley 62'; Con: Brendan McKibbin (2/3) 45', 63'; Pen: Brendan McKibbin (0/2)	Attendance: 21,114; Referee: Francisco Pastrana (Argentina)

27 April 2013	Cheetahs	26–12	Southern Kings	Free State Stadium, Bloemfontein
19:10	Try: Raymond Rhule 7'; Lappies Labuschagné 31'; Willie le Roux 45'; Con: Burton Francis (1/3) 32'; Pen: Burton Francis (3/3) 16', 58', 67'	Scoreboard	Pen: Demetri Catrakilis (4/5) 11', 29', 35', 55'	Attendance: 19,927; Referee: Jonathon White (New Zealand)

28 April 2013	Crusaders	30–26	Rebels	AMI Stadium, Christchurch
16:05	Try: Zac Guildford 3'; Tyler Bleyendaal 12'; Con: Tom Taylor (1/2) 13'; Pen: Tom Taylor (6/6) 36', 40', 49', 63', 69', 77'	Scoreboard	Try: Scott Higginbotham 23'; James O'Connor 52'; Ged Robinson 55'; Con: James O'Connor (1/2) 56'; Jason Woodward (0/1); Pen: James O'Connor (3/3) 21', 39', 44'; Jason Woodward (0/1)	Attendance: 13,000; Referee: Nick Briant (New Zealand)

Bye/s: Highlanders

=== Round 12 ===
3 May 2013	Blues	18–17	Stormers	North Harbour Stadium, Albany
19:35	Pen: Chris Noakes (6/7) 9', 16', 34', 43', 50', 73'	Scoreboard	Try: Jean de Villiers (2) 65', 75'; Con: Joe Pietersen (2/2) 66', 78'; Pen: Joe Pietersen (1/2) 21'	Attendance: 16,111; Referee: Glen Jackson (New Zealand)

3 May 2013	Rebels	33–39	Chiefs	AAMI Park, Melbourne
19:40	Try: Scott Higginbotham 14'; Hugh Pyle (2) 35', 63'; Nick Phipps 67'; Kurtley Beale 75'; Con: James O'Connor (4/5) 15', 36', 64', 76'	Scoreboard	Try: Gareth Anscombe (3) 1', 20', 26'; Bundee Aki 9'; Sam Cane 50'; Brodie Retallick 69'; Con: Gareth Anscombe (3/6) 10', 21', 51'; Pen: Gareth Anscombe (1/1) 67'	Attendance: 13,107; Referee: Garratt Williamson (New Zealand)

4 May 2013	Highlanders	25–22	Sharks	Forsyth Barr Stadium, Dunedin
19:35	Try: Shaun Treeby 10'; Aaron Smith 43'; Colin Slade 55'; Con: Colin Slade (2/3) 11', 44'; Pen: Colin Slade (2/5) 48', 52'; Cards: Brad Thorn (yellow card) 80'	Scoreboard	Try: Meyer Bosman (2) 14', 62'; Lwazi Mvovo 35'; Con: Patrick Lambie (2/3) 15', 63'; Pen: Patrick Lambie (1/1) 29'; Cards: JP Pietersen (yellow card) 7'	Attendance: 11,008; Referee: Steve Walsh (Australia)

4 May 2013	Force	11–11	Reds	nib Stadium, Perth
17:40	Try: Ben McCalman 52'; Con: Sias Ebersohn (0/1); Pen: Sias Ebersohn (2/3) 21', 26'	Scoreboard	Try: Chris Feauai-Sautia 73'; Con: Quade Cooper (0/1); Pen: Quade Cooper (2/3) 34', 61'	Attendance: 11,972; Referee: Rohan Hoffmann (Australia)

4 May 2013	Southern Kings	10–72	Waratahs	Nelson Mandela Bay Stadium, Port Elizabeth
17:05	Try: Sergeal Petersen 39'; Con: Demetri Catrakilis (1/1) 40'; Pen: Demetri Catrakilis (1/1) 10'	Scoreboard	Try: Cam Crawford (3) 1', 15', 36'; Israel Folau 6'; Kane Douglas 19'; Michael Hooper 26'; Peter Betham (2) 28', 53'; Dave Dennis 46'; Ben Volavola 73'; Tom Kingston 76'; Con: Brendan McKibbin (5/9) 7', 16', 26', 29', 54'; Matt Lucas (2/2) 74', 77'; Pen: Brendan McKibbin (1/1) 12'	Attendance: 21,503; Referee: Jonathan Kaplan (South Africa)

4 May 2013	Bulls	48–14	Hurricanes	Loftus Versfeld, Pretoria
19:10	Try: JJ Engelbrecht 19'; Deon Stegmann 23'; Akona Ndungane 37'; Dean Greyling 46'; Lionel Mapoe 70'; Louis Fouché 78'; Con: Morné Steyn (5/5) 20', 24', 38', 46', 71'; Louis Fouché (1/1) 79'; Pen: Morné Steyn (2/3) 6', 12'; Drop: Morné Steyn (0/1)	Scoreboard	Try: TJ Perenara (2) 41', 54'; Con: Beauden Barrett (2/2) 42', 55'; Cards: Jason Eaton (yellow card) 69'	Attendance: 19,814; Referee: Lourens van der Merwe (South Africa)

5 May 2013	Brumbies	23–30	Crusaders	Canberra Stadium, Canberra
16:05	Try: Matt To'omua 7'; Ben Mowen 75'; Con: Christian Lealiifano (1/1) 8'; Matt To'omua (1/1) 75'; Pen: Christian Lealiifano (3/4) 11', 66', 79'; Jesse Mogg (0/1)	Scoreboard	Try: Andy Ellis 21'; Zac Guildford 50'; Israel Dagg 72'; Con: Dan Carter (3/3) 22', 51', 73'; Pen: Dan Carter (3/3) 14', 57', 64'	Attendance: 16,544; Referee: Craig Joubert (South Africa)

Bye/s: Cheetahs

=== Round 13 ===
10 May 2013	Chiefs	22–21	Force	ECOLight Stadium, Pukekohe
19:35	Try: Lelia Masaga 15'; Con: Aaron Cruden (1/1) 16'; Pen: Aaron Cruden (5/5) 7', 19', 27', 38', 44'	Scoreboard	Try: Patrick Dellit (2) 3', 61'; Con: Jayden Hayward (1/2) 62'; Pen: Jayden Hayward (3/3) 30', 35', 58'; Sias Ebersohn (0/1); Cards: Kieran Longbottom (yellow card) 71'	Attendance: 5,112; Referee: Mike Fraser (New Zealand)

10 May 2013	Reds	32–17	Sharks	Suncorp Stadium, Brisbane
19:40	Try: Saia Fainga'a 5'; Rodney Davies (2) 15', 34'; Anthony Fainga'a 20'; Con: Quade Cooper (3/4) 6', 21', 35'; Pen: Quade Cooper (2/2) 30', 72'	Scoreboard	Try: Piet Lindeque 43'; Derick Minnie 66'; Con: Patrick Lambie (2/2) 44', 67'; Pen: Patrick Lambie (1/1) 11'	Attendance: 31,921; Referee: Glen Jackson (New Zealand)

10 May 2013	Cheetahs	34–39	Hurricanes	Free State Stadium, Bloemfontein
19:10	Try: Coenie Oosthuizen (2) 56', 72'; Robert Ebersohn 76'; Con: Elgar Watts (2/3) 57', 73'; Pen: Burton Francis (4/5) 25', 29', 36', 40'; Elgar Watts (1/1) 80'; Cards: Robert Ebersohn (yellow card) 15'	Scoreboard	Try: Beauden Barrett 51'; Julian Savea 53'; TJ Perenara 61'; Victor Vito 69'; Con: Beauden Barrett (2/4) 62', 70'; Pen: Beauden Barrett (5/5) 5', 12', 16', 31', 67'	Attendance: 16,878; Referee: Stuart Berry (South Africa)

11 May 2013	Blues	36–32	Rebels	Eden Park, Auckland
19:35	Try: Frank Halai (3) 10', 23', 32'; Francis Saili (2) 19', 27'; Rene Ranger 71'; Con: Chris Noakes (2/5) 24', 28'; Baden Kerr (1/1) 72'; Pen: Chris Noakes (0/1); Drop: Baden Kerr (0/1)	Scoreboard	Try: Mitch Inman (2) 12', 62'; Scott Higginbotham 28'; Lachlan Mitchell 47'; Jason Woodward 80'; Con: James O'Connor (0/1); Jason Woodward (2/4) 63', 80+1'; Pen: James O'Connor (0/2); Jason Woodward (1/1) 67'	Attendance: 14,700; Referee: Garratt Williamson (New Zealand)

11 May 2013	Waratahs	21–15	Stormers	Allianz Stadium, Sydney
19:40	Try: Cam Crawford 24'; Israel Folau 77'; Con: Brendan McKibbin (0/1); Berrick Barnes (1/1) 78'; Pen: Brendan McKibbin (2/2) 40', 52'; Berrick Barnes (1/1) 80'	Scoreboard	Pen: Joe Pietersen (5/5) 16', 45', 49', 58', 65'	Attendance: 17,042; Referee: Chris Pollock (New Zealand)

11 May 2013	Southern Kings	34–27	Highlanders	Nelson Mandela Bay Stadium, Port Elizabeth
17:05	Try: Luke Watson (2) 29', 40'; Cornell du Preez 51'; Shaun Venter 56'; Con: Demetri Catrakilis (4/4) 30', 40', 52', 57'; Pen: Demetri Catrakilis (2/3) 2', 9'; Drop: Demetri Catrakilis (0/2)	Scoreboard	Try: Colin Slade 34'; Brad Thorn 37'; Shaun Treeby 70'; Hosea Gear 74'; Con: Colin Slade (2/4) 35', 38'; Pen: Colin Slade (1/2) 16'; Cards: Tamati Ellison (yellow card) 51'	Attendance: 18,542; Referee: Jason Jaftha (South Africa)

Bye/s: Brumbies, Bulls, Crusaders

=== Round 14 ===
17 May 2013	Hurricanes	12–17	Chiefs	Westpac Stadium, Wellington
19:35	Pen: Beauden Barrett (4/4) 4', 17', 32', 71'	Scoreboard	Try: Tanerau Latimer 54'; Con: Aaron Cruden (0/1); Pen: Aaron Cruden (4/4) 6', 11', 20', 36'; Cards: Ben Tameifuna (yellow card) 70'	Attendance: 12,998; Referee: Lourens van der Merwe (South Africa)

17 May 2013	Rebels	30–21	Stormers	AAMI Park, Melbourne
19:40	Try: Scott Higginbotham 12'; Hugh Pyle 53' penalty try 74'; Con: Jason Woodward (3/3) 13', 54', 75'; Pen: Jason Woodward (3/4) 5', 39', 79'	Scoreboard	Try: Louis Schreuder 16'; Bryan Habana 27'; Andries Bekker 58'; Con: Joe Pietersen (3/3) 17', 28', 59'; Cards: Martin Bezuidenhout (yellow card) 74'	Attendance: 10,333; Referee: Mike Fraser (New Zealand)

17 May 2013	Force	13–23	Sharks	nib Stadium, Perth
19:45	Try: Kyle Godwin 31'; Con: Jayden Hayward (1/1) 32'; Pen: Jayden Hayward (2/3) 8', 54'; Drop: Sias Ebersohn (0/1)	Scoreboard	Try: Keegan Daniel 23'; Riaan Viljoen 62'; Con: Patrick Lambie (2/2) 24', 63'; Pen: Patrick Lambie (3/5) 45', 51', 73'	Attendance: 12,652; Referee: James Leckie (Australia)

18 May 2013	Crusaders	23–3	Blues	AMI Stadium, Christchurch
19:35	Try: Ryan Crotty 26'; Owen Franks 49'; Con: Tom Taylor (2/2) 27', 50'; Pen: Tom Taylor (3/4) 23', 40', 58'	Scoreboard	Pen: Chris Noakes (1/1) 30'; Cards: Culum Retallick (yellow card) 40'	Attendance: 17,264; Referee: Glen Jackson (New Zealand)

18 May 2013	Waratahs	28–22	Brumbies	ANZ Stadium, Sydney
19:40	Try: Michael Hooper 44'; Berrick Barnes 65'; Peter Betham 74'; Con: Berrick Barnes (2/3) 45', 75'; Pen: Brendan McKibbin (2/2) 11', 30'; Berrick Barnes (1/2) 51'	Scoreboard	Try: Ben Mowen 21'; Tevita Kuridrani 36'; Con: Christian Lealiifano (0/1); Jesse Mogg (0/1); Pen: Christian Lealiifano (1/1) 8'; Jesse Mogg (3/3) 53', 60', 63'; Cards: Tevita Kuridrani (yellow card) 50'	Attendance: 21,817; Referee: Steve Walsh (Australia)

18 May 2013	Bulls	35–18	Highlanders	Loftus Versfeld, Pretoria
17:05	Try: JJ Engelbrecht 2'; Akona Ndungane 38'; Pierre Spies 47'; Jano Vermaak 78'; Con: Morné Steyn (3/4) 3', 39', 48'; Pen: Morné Steyn (3/4) 17', 26', 28'	Scoreboard	Try: Fumiaki Tanaka 72'; Tamati Ellison 80+1'; Con: Hayden Parker (1/2) 73'; Pen: Colin Slade (2/2) 6', 15'; Cards: Maritino Nemani (yellow card) 48'; Chris King (yellow card) 57'	Attendance: 21,424; Referee: Jaco Peyper (South Africa)

18 May 2013	Cheetahs	27–13	Reds	Free State Stadium, Bloemfontein
19:10	Try: Piet van Zyl (2) 3', 24'; Con: Elgar Watts (1/2) 25'; Pen: Elgar Watts (5/5) 13', 28', 43', 61', 64'	Scoreboard	Try: Ben Lucas 78'; Con: Quade Cooper (1/1) 79'; Pen: Quade Cooper (2/2) 19', 23'	Attendance: 15,792; Referee: Craig Joubert (South Africa)

Bye/s: Southern Kings

=== Round 15 ===
24 May 2013	Chiefs	28–19	Crusaders	Waikato Stadium, Hamilton
19:35	Try: Aaron Cruden 12'; Craig Clarke 29'; Bundee Aki 70'; Con: Aaron Cruden (2/3) 13', 71'; Pen: Aaron Cruden (3/4) 23', 53', 80+1'	Scoreboard	Try: Matt Todd 18'; Con: Tom Taylor (1/1) 19'; Pen: Tom Taylor (4/4) 6', 38', 45', 49'	Attendance: 22,187; Referee: Steve Walsh (Australia)

24 May 2013	Rebels	24–22	Waratahs	AAMI Park, Melbourne
19:40	Try: Tom English (2) 10', 75'; Con: Jason Woodward (1/2) 11'; Pen: Jason Woodward (4/4) 6', 31', 59', 65'	Scoreboard	Try: Israel Folau 36'; Con: Berrick Barnes (1/1) 37'; Pen: Berrick Barnes (4/4) 9', 13', 33', 45'; Brendan McKibbin (1/2) 67'	Attendance: 12,062; Referee: Garratt Williamson (New Zealand)

25 May 2013	Blues	13–20	Brumbies	Eden Park, Auckland
19:35	Try: Rene Ranger 53'; Con: Chris Noakes (1/1) 54'; Pen: Chris Noakes (1/1) 45'; Baden Kerr (1/1) 67'	Scoreboard	Try: Nic White 22'; Con: Christian Lealiifano (0/1); Pen: Christian Lealiifano (5/6) 2', 16', 40', 60', 73'; Jesse Mogg (0/1); Drop: Jesse Mogg (0/1)	Attendance: 10,811; Referee: Lourens van der Merwe (South Africa)

25 May 2013	Force	19–18	Highlanders	nib Stadium, Perth
17:40	Try: Sias Ebersohn 17'; Con: Jayden Hayward (1/1) 18'; Pen: Jayden Hayward (4/6) 26', 49', 58', 78'; Cards: Alby Mathewson (yellow card) 61'	Scoreboard	Pen: Hayden Parker (2/2) 21', 28'; Colin Slade (4/5) 47', 51', 70', 76'	Attendance: 12,508; Referee: Andrew Lees (Australia)

25 May 2013	Southern Kings	22–34	Cheetahs	Nelson Mandela Bay Stadium, Port Elizabeth
15:00	Try: Nicolás Vergallo 79'; Con: George Whitehead (1/1) 80'; Pen: Demetri Catrakilis (5/5) 3', 12', 23', 34', 47'; SP Marais (0/1)	Scoreboard	Try: Johann Sadie (2) 39', 55'; Piet van Zyl 51'; Willie le Roux 62'; Con: Elgar Watts (4/4) 40', 52', 56', 63'; Pen: Elgar Watts (2/2) 6', 29'	Attendance: 22,023; Referee: Stuart Berry (South Africa)

25 May 2013	Stormers	20–15	Reds	DHL Newlands Stadium, Cape Town
17:05	Try: Jean de Villiers 44'; Con: Joe Pietersen (0/1); Pen: Joe Pietersen (5/6) 40', 52', 61', 71', 76'	Scoreboard	Pen: Quade Cooper (5/7) 48', 55', 59', 64', 69'	Attendance: 32,756; Referee: Jaco Peyper (South Africa)

25 May 2013	Sharks	16–18	Bulls	Growthpoint Kings Park, Durban
19:10	Try: Charl McLeod 71'; Con: Patrick Lambie (1/1) 72'; Pen: Patrick Lambie (3/4) 4', 48', 54'; Riaan Viljoen (0/1); Cards: Franco van der Merwe (yellow card) 49'	Scoreboard	Pen: Morné Steyn (6/7) 10', 22', 34', 50', 61', 75'; Cards: Bjorn Basson (yellow card) 44'	Attendance: 30,034; Referee: Jonathan Kaplan (South Africa)

Bye/s: Hurricanes

=== Round 16 ===
31 May 2013	Crusaders	23–22	Waratahs	AMI Stadium, Christchurch
19:35	Try: Corey Flynn 39'; Matt Todd 62'; Con: Dan Carter (2/2) 40', 63'; Pen: Dan Carter (3/4) 25', 66', 74'	Scoreboard	Try: Cam Crawford 21'; Peter Betham 32'; Bernard Foley 44'; Con: Brendan McKibbin (2/3) 22', 45'; Pen: Brendan McKibbin (1/1) 6'; Berrick Barnes (0/1)	Attendance: 11,500; Referee: Glen Jackson (New Zealand)

31 May 2013	Brumbies	30–23	Hurricanes	Canberra Stadium, Canberra
19:40	Try: Nic White 21'; Peter Kimlin 61'; Con: Christian Lealiifano (1/2) 62'; Pen: Christian Lealiifano (6/6) 4', 9', 34', 43', 53', 57'	Scoreboard	Try: Rey Lee-Lo 25'; TJ Perenara 67'; Con: Beauden Barrett (2/2) 26', 68'; Pen: Beauden Barrett (3/4) 11', 45', 48'	Attendance: 11,300; Referee: Jaco Peyper (South Africa)

1 June 2013	Highlanders	38–28	Blues	Forsyth Barr Stadium, Dunedin
19:35	Try: Ben Smith (2) 10', 29'; Tamati Ellison 22'; Hosea Gear 33'; Con: Colin Slade (3/4) 11', 23', 34'; Pen: Colin Slade (3/4) 18', 45', 48'; Hayden Parker (1/1) 75'; Cards: Jamie Mackintosh (yellow card) 80'	Scoreboard	Try: Waisake Naholo 40'; Rene Ranger 54'; Steve Luatua 66'; Luke Braid 80+3'; Con: Baden Kerr (4/4) 40', 55', 67', 80+4'	Attendance: 12,888; Referee: Jonathon White (New Zealand)

1 June 2013	Reds	33–20	Rebels	Suncorp Stadium, Brisbane
19:40	Try: Luke Morahan 31'; Jake Schatz 58'; Quade Cooper 69'; Ben Lucas 80'; Con: Quade Cooper (1/2) 32'; Mike Harris (1/2) 70'; Pen: Quade Cooper (2/3) 14', 65'; Drop: Quade Cooper (1/1) 38'; Cards: Beau Robinson (yellow card) 22'	Scoreboard	Try: Scott Fuglistaller 34'; Rory Sidey 40'; Con: James O'Connor (2/2) 35', 40'; Pen: James O'Connor (2/2) 4', 44'	Attendance: 31,504; Referee: James Leckie (Australia)

1 June 2013	Stormers	19–11	Southern Kings	DHL Newlands Stadium, Cape Town
17:05	Try: Deon Fourie 64'; Con: Joe Pietersen (1/1) 65'; Pen: Joe Pietersen (4/5) 4', 10', 48', 58'	Scoreboard	Try: Wimpie van der Walt 74'; Con: George Whitehead (0/1); Pen: George Whitehead (2/2) 16', 55'; Drop: George Whitehead (0/1)	Attendance: 16,856; Referee: Craig Joubert (South Africa)

1 June 2013	Cheetahs	25–30	Bulls	Free State Stadium, Bloemfontein
19:10	Try: Willie le Roux 13'; Riaan Smit 69'; Trevor Nyakane 79'; Con: Riaan Smit (2/3) 14', 80'; Pen: Riaan Smit (2/2) 28', 44'	Scoreboard	Try: Werner Kruger 10'; Deon Stegmann 18'; Jano Vermaak 63'; Con: Morné Steyn (3/4) 11', 19', 64'; Pen: Morné Steyn (3/4) 40', 47', 59'; Drop: Morné Steyn (0/1)	Attendance: 32,220; Referee: Jason Jaftha (South Africa)

Bye/s: Chiefs, Force, Sharks

=== Round 17 ===
7 June 2013	Brumbies	39–17	Rebels	Canberra Stadium, Canberra
19:40	Try: Clyde Rathbone (2) 11', 48'; Colby Faingaa 57'; Henry Speight 53'; Scott Sio 4'; Zack Holmes 64'; Con: Ian Prior (3/4) 54', 58', 65'; Pen: Jesse Mogg (1/1) 43'	Scoreboard	Try: Tom English 45'; Paul Alo-Emile 69'; Con: Jason Woodward (2) 46', 70'; Pen: Jason Woodward 21'	Attendance: 11,055; Referee: Rohan Hoffmann (Australia)

9 June 2013	Force	13–28	Waratahs	nib Stadium, Perth
14:05	Try: Pekahou Cowan 22'; Kyle Godwin 63'; Con: Jayden Hayward (0/2); Pen: Jayden Hayward (1/2) 3'	Scoreboard	Try: Ollie Atkins 6'; Cam Crawford 9'; Tom Kingston 25'; Con: Brendan McKibbin (2/3) 8', 11'; Pen: Brendan McKibbin (2/2) 19', 67'; Bernard Foley (1/1) 75'; Cards: Jed Holloway (yellow card) 56'	Attendance: 10,198; Referee: Angus Gardner (Australia)

Bye/s: Reds. No games: Blues, Bulls, Cheetahs, Chiefs, Crusaders, Highlanders, Hurricanes, Southern Kings, Sharks, Stormers

=== Round 18 ===
28 June 2013	Chiefs	34–22	Hurricanes	Waikato Stadium, Hamilton
19:35	Try: Matt Vant Leven 17'; Bundee Aki 26'; Tawera Kerr-Barlow 64'; Ben Tameifuna 74'; Con: Aaron Cruden (4/4) 18', 27', 65', 75'; Pen: Aaron Cruden (2/3) 8', 56'	Scoreboard	Try: TJ Perenara 14'; Beauden Barrett 29'; Alapati Leiua 76'; Con: Beauden Barrett (2/3) 15', 77'; Pen: Beauden Barrett (1/2) 35'	Attendance: 16,000; Referee: Garratt Williamson (New Zealand)

29 June 2013	Highlanders	12–40	Crusaders	Forsyth Barr Stadium, Dunedin
19:35	Try: Ben Smith 6'; Hosea Gear 55'; Con: Colin Slade (1/2) 8'; Pen: Colin Slade (0/2); Drop: Colin Slade (0/1); Cards: Jarrad Hoeata (yellow card) 18'; Ma'a Nonu (red card) 57'	Scoreboard	Try: George Whitelock 29'; Andrew Ellis 42'; Daniel Carter 66'; Telusa Veainu 80'; Con: Dan Carter (4/4) 29', 43', 68', 80'; Pen: Dan Carter (4/4) 2', 40', 58', 64'; Cards: Corey Flynn (yellow card) 60'	Attendance: 18,463; Referee: Steve Walsh (Australia)

29 June 2013	Sharks	22–20	Blues	Growthpoint Kings Park, Durban
14:50	Try: Marcell Coetzee 23'; Charl McLeod 29'; Riaan Viljoen 80'; Con: Patrick Lambie (2/3) 24', 30'; Pen: Patrick Lambie (1/5) 40'	Scoreboard	Try: Frank Halai (2) 33', 42'; Rene Ranger 49'; Con: Chris Noakes (1/3) 50'; Pen: Baden Kerr (1/1) 61'	Attendance: 18,744; Referee: Jaco Peyper (South Africa)

29 June 2013	Bulls	48–18	Southern Kings	Loftus Versfeld, Pretoria
17:05	Try: Louis Fouché 8'; Chiliboy Ralepelle 29'; Jan Serfontein 31'; Francois Hougaard 34'; Jacques Potgieter 61'; Deon Stegmann 72'; Con: Louis Fouché 9' 1/1; Morné Steyn (5/5) 30', 32', 35', 62', 73'; Pen: Morné Steyn (2/3) 25', 58'	Scoreboard	Try: Wimpie van der Walt (2) 40', 53'; Con: Demetri Catrakilis (1/2) 40'; Pen: Demetri Catrakilis (2/2) 13', 17'	Attendance: 23,726; Referee: Lourens van der Merwe (South Africa)

29 June 2013	Stormers	28–3	Cheetahs	DHL Newlands Stadium, Cape Town
19:15	Try: Deon Fourie 37'; Siya Kolisi 65'; Bryan Habana 70'; Con: Joe Pietersen (2/3) 38', 66'; Pen: Joe Pietersen (3/3) 31', 50', 54'	Scoreboard	Pen: Riaan Smit (1/2) 19'	Attendance: 30,736; Referee: Stuart Berry (South Africa)

Bye/s: None. No games: Brumbies, Force, Rebels, Reds, Waratahs

=== Round 19 ===
5 July 2013	Crusaders	43–15	Chiefs	AMI Stadium, Christchurch
19:35	Try: Kieran Read (2) 40', 45'; Israel Dagg 42'; Ryan Crotty 57'; Tyler Bleyendaal 80+1'; Con: Dan Carter (3/5) 40', 43', 80+2'; Pen: Dan Carter (4/4) 4', 9', 14', 19'	Scoreboard	Try: Asaeli Tikoirotuma 25'; Charlie Ngatai 73'; Con: Aaron Cruden (0/1); Andrew Horrell (1/1) 74'; Pen: Aaron Cruden (1/1) 11'	Attendance: 18,000; Referee: Jonathon White (New Zealand)

6 July 2013	Hurricanes	44–49	Highlanders	Westpac Stadium, Wellington
19:35	Try: Ash Dixon 37'; Ben Franks 56'; Julian Savea 59'; Chris Smylie 70'; James Broadhurst 72'; Con: Beauden Barrett (5/5) 38', 57', 60', 70', 73'; Pen: Beauden Barrett (3/3) 6', 13', 75'	Scoreboard	Try: Mose Tuiali'i 15'; Tamati Ellison 18'; Aaron Smith 26'; Kade Poki 40'; Hosea Gear 65'; Elliot Dixon 67'; Con: Colin Slade (3/4) 16', 19', 27'; Hayden Parker (2/2) 66', 68'; Pen: Colin Slade (3/3) 2', 23', 46'; Cards: Aaron Smith (yellow card) 54'; Bronson Murray (yellow card) 74'	Attendance: 8,427; Referee: Mike Fraser (New Zealand)

6 July 2013	Cheetahs	34–13	Blues	Free State Stadium, Bloemfontein
14:50	Try: Philip van der Walt 22'; Sarel Pretorius 74'; Boom Prinsloo 78'; Con: Riaan Smit (2/2) 23', 75'; Elgar Watts (0/1); Pen: Riaan Smit (5/5) 2', 17', 30', 38', 61'	Scoreboard	Try: Jamison Gibson-Park 5'; Con: Baden Kerr (1/1) 6'; Pen: Baden Kerr (2/3) 26', 58'	Attendance: 19,632; Referee: Jaco Peyper (South Africa)

6 July 2013	Southern Kings	12–24	Stormers	Nelson Mandela Bay Stadium, Port Elizabeth
17:05	Pen: Demetri Catrakilis (4/5) 2', 10', 24', 59'; Drop: Demetri Catrakilis (0/1); Cards: Grant Kemp (yellow card) 15'	Scoreboard	Try: Deon Fourie (2) 39', 77'; Con: Joe Pietersen (1/1) 78'; Pen: Elton Jantjies (3/3) 14', 56', 71'; Joe Pietersen (1/1) 21'	Attendance: 43,620; Referee: Lourens van der Merwe (South Africa)

6 July 2013	Bulls	20–19	Sharks	Loftus Versfeld, Pretoria
19:15	Try: Bjorn Basson 24'; Jano Vermaak 73'; Con: Morné Steyn (2/2) 25', 74'; Pen: Morné Steyn (2/2) 7', 15'	Scoreboard	Try: Patrick Lambie 8'; Odwa Ndungane 54'; Con: Patrick Lambie (0/2); Pen: Patrick Lambie (3/4) 23', 44', 48'; Riaan Viljoen (0/2); Cards: Bismarck du Plessis (yellow card) 14'; Butch James (yellow card) 73'	Attendance: 49,566; Referee: Jason Jaftha (South Africa)

Bye/s: None. No games: Brumbies, Force, Rebels, Reds, Waratahs

=== Round 20 ===
12 July 2013	Crusaders	25–17	Hurricanes	AMI Stadium, Christchurch
19:35	Try: Zac Guildford 3'; Andy Ellis 52'; Tom Marshall 79'; Con: Dan Carter (2/3) 4', 80'; Pen: Dan Carter (2/2) 24', 39'	Scoreboard	Try: Victor Vito 7'; Brad Shields 46'; Julian Savea 64'; Con: Beauden Barrett (0/2); Andre Taylor (1/1) 65'	Attendance: 18,000; Referee: Glen Jackson (New Zealand)

12 July 2013	Rebels	38–37	Highlanders	AAMI Park, Melbourne
19:40	Try: Tom English (2) 9', 67'; Cooper Vuna (2) 47', 62'; Bryce Hegarty (2) 74', 79'; Con: Jason Woodward (4/5) 10', 48', 63', 68'; Gareth Delve (0/1); Pen: Jason Woodward (0/1)	Scoreboard	Try: Ben Smith 6'; Hosea Gear 18'; Tamati Ellison 36'; Tony Woodcock 40'; Con: Colin Slade (4/4) 7', 20', 37', 40'; Pen: Colin Slade (2/2) 27', 52'; Hayden Parker (1/1) 77'	Attendance: 12,485; Referee: Andrew Lees (Australia)

13 July 2013	Blues	16–26	Chiefs	Eden Park, Auckland
19:35	Try: Charles Piutau 28'; Con: Baden Kerr (1/1) 29'; Pen: Baden Kerr (3/3) 7', 39', 44'; Cards: Kane Barrett (red card) 23'; Baden Kerr (yellow card) 47'	Scoreboard	Try: Bundee Aki 14'; Hika Elliot 35'; Ben Tameifuna (2) 52', 63'; Con: Aaron Cruden (0/4); Pen: Aaron Cruden (1/1) 9'; Gareth Anscombe (1/1) 80'	Attendance: 25,118; Referee: Chris Pollock (New Zealand)

13 July 2013	Waratahs	12–14	Reds	ANZ Stadium, Sydney
19:40	Try: Cam Crawford 12'; Berrick Barnes 29'; Con: Brendan McKibbin (1/2) 13'; Pen: Brendan McKibbin (0/1); Berrick Barnes (0/2); Cards: John Ulugia (yellow card) 26'	Scoreboard	Try: Ben Lucas 20'; Con: Quade Cooper (0/1); Pen: Quade Cooper (3/4) 9', 47', 56'	Attendance: 26,037; Referee: Steve Walsh (Australia)

13 July 2013	Force	21–15	Brumbies	nib Stadium, Perth
19:40	Try: Matt Hodgson 23'; Ben McCalman 40'; Junior Rasolea 45'; Con: Jayden Hayward (3/3) 24', 41', 46'; Pen: Jayden Hayward (0/3)	Scoreboard	Try: Tevita Kuridrani 48'; Scott Fardy 68'; Con: Christian Lealiifano (1/2) 49'; Pen: Christian Lealiifano (1/1) 34'	Attendance: 11,000; Referee: Rohan Hoffmann (Australia)

13 July 2013	Sharks	58–13	Southern Kings	Growthpoint Kings Park, Durban
17:05	Try: Marcell Coetzee 6'; Bismarck du Plessis 13'; Odwa Ndungane 17' penalty try 33'; Riaan Viljoen 44'; Tendai Mtawarira 49'; Louis Ludik 57'; Keegan Daniel 73'; Fred Zeilinga 75'; Meyer Bosman 80+2'; Con: Meyer Bosman (4/9) 7', 14', 34', 45'; Jacques Botes (0/1)	Scoreboard	Try: George Whitehead 3'; Mpho Mbiyozo 30'; Con: George Whitehead (0/2); Pen: George Whitehead (1/1) 24'; Cards: Devin Oosthuizen (yellow card) 33'; Hadleigh Parkes (yellow card) 76'	Attendance: 21,000; Referee: Stuart Berry (South Africa)

13 July 2013	Stormers	30–13	Bulls	DHL Newlands Stadium, Cape Town
19:10	Try: Eben Etzebeth 10'; Bryan Habana 16'; Jean de Villiers 56'; Con: Gary van Aswegen (3/3) 12', 17', 57'; Pen: Gary van Aswegen (3/3) 24', 29', 37'; Cards: Jean de Villiers (yellow card) 40'; Martin Bezuidenhout (yellow card) 68'	Scoreboard	Try: Zane Kirchner 21'; Con: Morné Steyn (1/1) 22'; Pen: Morné Steyn (2/2) 14', 40'; Drop: Morné Steyn (0/1)	Attendance: 45,216; Referee: Craig Joubert (South Africa)

Bye/s: Cheetahs

== Finals ==
First round
20 July 2013
4	(New Zealand) Crusaders	38
5	(Australia) Reds	9
21 July 2013
3	(Australia) Brumbies	15
6	(South Africa) Cheetahs	13

Semifinals
27 July 2013
1	(New Zealand) Chiefs	20
4	(New Zealand) Crusaders	19
27 July 2013
2	(South Africa) Bulls	23
3	(Australia) Brumbies	26

Final
3 August 2013
(New Zealand) Chiefs	27
(Australia) Brumbies	22

=== Qualifiers ===
20 July 2013
19:35

Crusaders	38–9	Reds
Try: Ryan Crotty (2) 10', 66'; Dan Carter 30'; Tom Marshall 51'; Con: Dan Carter (3/4) 11', 52', 67'; Pen: Dan Carter (3/4) 3', 26', 39'; Tom Taylor (1/1) 72'	Scoreboard	Pen: Quade Cooper (3/4) 14', 29', 46'; Ben Lucas (0/1)

AMI Stadium, Christchurch
Attendance: 14,000
Referee: Jaco Peyper (South Africa)

21 July 2013
16:10

Brumbies	15–13	Cheetahs
Pen: Christian Lealiifano (4/6) 3', 30', 59', 67'; Nic White (1/1) 48'	Scoreboard	Try: Johann Sadie 16'; Rayno Benjamin 79'; Con: Riaan Smit (0/2); Pen: Riaan Smit (1/2) 46'

Canberra Stadium, Canberra
Attendance: 14,020
Referee: Glen Jackson (New Zealand)

=== Semi-finals ===
27 July 2013
19:35

Chiefs	20–19	Crusaders
Try: Lelia Masaga 51'; Aaron Cruden 57'; Con: Aaron Cruden (2/2) 52', 58'; Pen: Aaron Cruden (2/3) 21', 47'	Scoreboard	Try: Israel Dagg 59'; Con: Dan Carter (1/1) 60'; Pen: Dan Carter (4/6) 6', 19', 28', 75'; Drop: Dan Carter (0/2)

Waikato Stadium, Hamilton
Attendance: 24,000
Referee: Steve Walsh (Australia)

27 July 2013
17:05

Bulls	23–26	Brumbies
Try: JJ Engelbrecht 16'; Con: Morné Steyn (0/1); Pen: Morné Steyn (6/7) 22', 29', 43', 51', 60', 76'; Drop: Morné Steyn (0/1)	Scoreboard	Try: Jesse Mogg 11'; Tevita Kuridrani 78'; Con: Christian Lealiifano (2/2) 12', 80'; Pen: Christian Lealiifano (4/5) 3', 25', 36', 49'

Loftus Versfeld, Pretoria
Attendance: 37,000
Referee: Craig Joubert (South Africa)

=== Final ===
3 August 2013
19:35

Chiefs	27–22	Brumbies
Try: Liam Messam 64'; Robbie Robinson 68'; Con: Aaron Cruden (1/2) 69'; Pen: Aaron Cruden (5/7) 23', 26', 32', 48', 72'; Drop: Gareth Anscombe (0/1)	Scoreboard	Try: Christian Lealiifano 38'; Con: Christian Lealiifano 39'; Pen: Christian Lealiifano (5/5) 6', 8', 21', 46', 59'; Nic White (0/1); Jesse Mogg (0/1)

Waikato Stadium, Hamilton
Attendance: 25,114
Referee: Craig Joubert (South Africa)

== Promotion/relegation play-offs ==
The Promotion/Relegation series is not an official part of the Super Rugby competition as organised by SANZAR. Instead, it was introduced by SARU to give the sixth South African franchise an opportunity to qualify for Super Rugby.

=== Log ===
2013 Super Rugby Promotion Relegation Series Log
Pos	Team	Pld	W	D	L	PF	PA	PD	TB	LB	Pts	Qualification
1	Lions	2	1	0	1	44	42	+2	0	1	5	2014 Super Rugby competition
2	Southern Kings	2	1	0	1	42	44	−2	0	1	5	

Rules for classification: 4 points for a win, 2 points for a draw, 1 bonus point for a loss by seven points or less, 1 bonus point for scoring four or more tries in a match

=== Results ===
26 July 2013
19:10

Southern Kings	19–26	Lions
Try: Marcello Sampson 28' m Steven Sykes 70' m Pen: Demetri Catrakilis (3/4) 3', 11', 33'	Scoreboard	Try: Stokkies Hanekom 38' c, 66' c Con: Elton Jantjies (2/2) 39', 67'; Pen: Elton Jantjies (4/5) 9', 14', 18', 22'; Cards: Dylan des Fountain (yellow card) 69'

Nelson Mandela Bay Stadium, Port Elizabeth
Attendance: 27,358
Referee: Jaco Peyper (South Africa)

3 August 2013
17:00

Lions	18–23	Southern Kings
Try: Derick Minnie 35' m Jaco Kriel 55' c Con: Elton Jantjies (1/2) 56'; Pen: Elton Jantjies (2/4) 30', 44'; Cards: Stokkies Hanekom (yellow card) 66'	Scoreboard	Try: Schalk Ferreira 68' c Scott van Breda 74' c Con: Scott van Breda (2/2) 69', 75'; Pen: Scott van Breda (3/4) 11', 14', 39'

Ellis Park Stadium, Johannesburg
Referee: Stuart Berry (South Africa)

- Lions are promoted to Super Rugby for 2014.
- Southern Kings are relegated from Super Rugby for 2014.

== Players ==
=== Leading try scorers ===
Top 10 try scorers (including ties)
Pos	Name	Team	Tries
1	Frank Halai	Blues	10
2	Cam Crawford	Waratahs	8
2	Israel Folau	Waratahs	8
2	Hosea Gear	Highlanders	8
2	Henry Speight	Brumbies	8
6	TJ Perenara	Hurricanes	7
6	Julian Savea	Hurricanes	7
8	Bundee Aki	Chiefs	6
8	Scott Higginbotham	Rebels	6
8	Willie le Roux	Cheetahs	6
8	Jesse Mogg	Brumbies	6
8	Tim Nanai-Williams	Chiefs	6
8	Rene Ranger	Blues	6
8	Ben Smith	Highlanders	6
8	Ben Tameifuna	Chiefs	6
8	Wimpie van der Walt	Southern Kings	6

Source: South African Rugby Union

=== Leading point scorers ===
Top 10 overall point scorers
Pos	Name	Team	Points
1	Morné Steyn	Bulls	248
2	Christian Lealiifano	Brumbies	233
3	Beauden Barrett	Hurricanes	186
4	Quade Cooper	Reds	172
5	Patrick Lambie	Sharks	171
6	Dan Carter	Crusaders	170
6	Joe Pietersen	Stormers	170
8	Gareth Anscombe	Chiefs	166
9	Demetri Catrakilis	Southern Kings	142
10	Brendan McKibbin	Waratahs	139

Source: South African Rugby Union

== Referees ==
The following refereeing panel was appointed by SANZAR for the 2013 Super Rugby season:

== Attendances ==
Team	Main stadium	Capacity	Total attendance	Average attendance	% capacity
(New Zealand) Blues	Eden Park	50,000	162,742	20,342	43%
(New Zealand) Chiefs	Waikato Stadium	25,800	162,473	16,247	68%
(New Zealand) Hurricanes	Westpac Stadium	34,500	86,840	10,855	33%
(New Zealand) Crusaders	Rugby League Park	18,000	134,679	14,964	83%
(New Zealand) Highlanders	Forsyth Barr Stadium	30,728	106,427	13,303	45%
(Australia) Reds	Suncorp Stadium	52,500	254,693	31,836	60%
(Australia) Brumbies	Canberra Stadium	25,011	128,319	14,257	57%
(Australia) Waratahs	Sydney Football Stadium	44,000	135,593	16,949	38%
(Australia) Melbourne Rebels	AAMI Park	29,500	98,646	12,330	41%
(Australia) Force	nib Stadium	20,500	103,545	12,943	63%
(South Africa) Sharks	ABSA Stadium	52,000	179,246	22,405	43%
(South Africa) Bulls	Loftus Versfeld	51,792	277,601	30,844	59%
(South Africa) Southern Kings	Nelson Mandela Bay Stadium	48,000	257,022	32,127	66%
(South Africa) Cheetahs	Free State Stadium	46,000	165,017	20,627	44%
(South Africa) Stormers	Newlands Stadium	51,900	294,340	36,792	70%

== See also ==
- Super Rugby
