= Mafi =

Mafi is a surname and a nickname

It may refer to the following people:

== Surname ==
- Alex Mafi (born 1996), Australian rugby union player who plays for Queensland Reds
- Alfie Mafi (born 1988), Tongan rugby player
- Amanaki Mafi (born 1990), Tongan rugby union player who plays for the Japanese national side
- Atonio Mafi (born 2000), Tongan-American football player
- Falamani Mafi (born 1971), Tongan former rugby union player
- Lifeimi Mafi (born 1982), Tongan rugby player
- Mateaki Mafi (born 1972), Tongan rugby football player who represented Tonga at the 1995 Rugby League World Cup, and at the 1992 Summer Olympics as a 200m sprinter
- Matt Mafi (born 1993), Australian rugby union hooker who currently plays for Brisbane City in Australia's National Rugby Championship
- Parvaneh Mafi (born 1957), Iranian reformist politician and a member of the Parliament of Iran representing Tehran, Rey, Shemiranat and Eslamshahr electoral district
- Reza Mafi (1943–1982), Iranian calligrapher
- Soane Patita Paini Mafi (born 1961), Cardinal; Bishop of Tonga
- Steve Mafi (born 1989), Australian-born rugby player who plays for the Western Force and Tonga
- Tahereh Mafi (born 1988), American author of Iranian descent
- Winston Mafi (born 1980), Tongan rugby player

== Nickname ==
- Mahlet Afework, Ethiopian designer, known as "Mafi"

== See also ==
- Mafi Mafi, an Ethiopian fashion label, owned by Mahlet Afework
- Mafi roll trailer, a maritime shipping equipment
- Mafic minerals, silicates rich in magnesium and iron
