= Cam Crawford =

Australian rugby union player

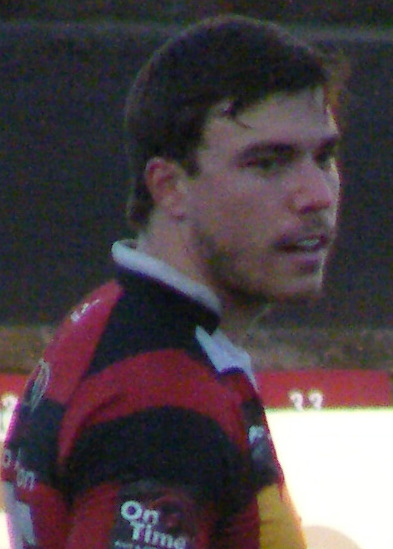
- Born: Cameron Crawford; 14 November 1988 (age 38) Sydney, Australia
- Height: 1.93 m (6 ft 4 in)
- Weight: 98 kg (15 st 6 lb)
- School: Sydney Grammar School
- University: University of Sydney

Rugby union career
- Position: Fullback / Wing
- Current team: Melbourne Rebels
Amateur team(s)
Years	Team	Apps	(Points)
- Northern Suburbs
Senior career
Years	Team	Apps	(Points)
2014–	North Harbour Rays	4	(0)
Super Rugby
Years	Team	Apps	(Points)
2012	Brumbies	1	(0)
2013–14	Waratahs	12	(40)
2015–16	Rebels	9	(10)
- Correct as of 21 July 2016

Cameron "Cam" Crawford (born 14 November 1988) is an Australian professional rugby union player who plays for the Rebels in Super Rugby as a full back.

Born in Sydney, Crawford has represented the Brumbies, Waratahs and Rebels in Super Rugby.

== Early years ==
As a schoolboy, Crawford represented Sydney Grammar School and was selected in the Combined GPS 2nd XV, having been kept out of the 1st XV by Kurtley Beale. Crawford played his junior rugby for Lindfield.

== Career ==
Crawford spent several years playing Shute Shield for Northern Suburbs Rugby Club.

=== Brumbies ===
Crawford was a member of the Brumbies in the 2012 Super Rugby season. He made only one Super Rugby appearance for the side, coming on as a late substitute in a 28–17 win over the Force.

=== Waratahs ===
After the 2012 Super Rugby season, he was released from his contract with the Brumbies to join the Waratahs. Crawford enjoyed a successful 2013 Super Rugby season. After scoring on his Waratahs debut in a win over the Chiefs, Crawford went on to score a hat-trick against the Southern Kings. Crawford's 8 tries from 7 appearances in the 2013 season made him the league's second highest try-scorer over the regular season, behind Frank Halai. Following such a successful debut season, Crawford was widely expected to become a Wallabies "bolter" under Ewen McKenzie, however, injury and surgery kept Crawford out of action for the remainder of 2013. Ironically, it was his winger partner at the Waratahs, Peter Betham that went on to make his Wallabies debut against the All Blacks in Dunedin.

Crawford was a member of the Waratahs squad for the 2014 Super Rugby season, in which the team won its first Super Rugby title.

=== Rebels ===
Crawford signed with the Rebels in June 2014 on a two season contract, starting from the 2015 Super Rugby season. He made his Super Rugby debut for the Rebels in a loss to the Stormers in South Africa in May 2015. He scored his first try for the side in a loss to the Hurricanes in April 2016.

== Super Rugby statistics ==
As of 21 July 2016

Season	Team	Games	Starts	Sub	Mins	Tries	Cons	Pens	Drops	Points	Yel	Red
2012	Brumbies	1	0	1	2	0	0	0	0	0	0	0
2013	Waratahs	7	7	0	542	8	0	0	0	40	0	0
2014	Waratahs	5	4	1	313	0	0	0	0	0	0	0
2015	Rebels	3	3	0	228	0	0	0	0	0	0	0
2016	Rebels	6	5	1	403	2	0	0	0	10	0	0
Total		22	19	3	1469	10	0	0	0	50	0	0
