= Dellit =

Dellit may refer to:

== People with the surname ==
- Charles Bruce Dellit (prominent Australian Art Deco architect)
- Patrick Dellit (Australian rugby union footballer)

== Places ==
- Dellit Lake (lake in Illinois, USA)
