= Jake Schatz =

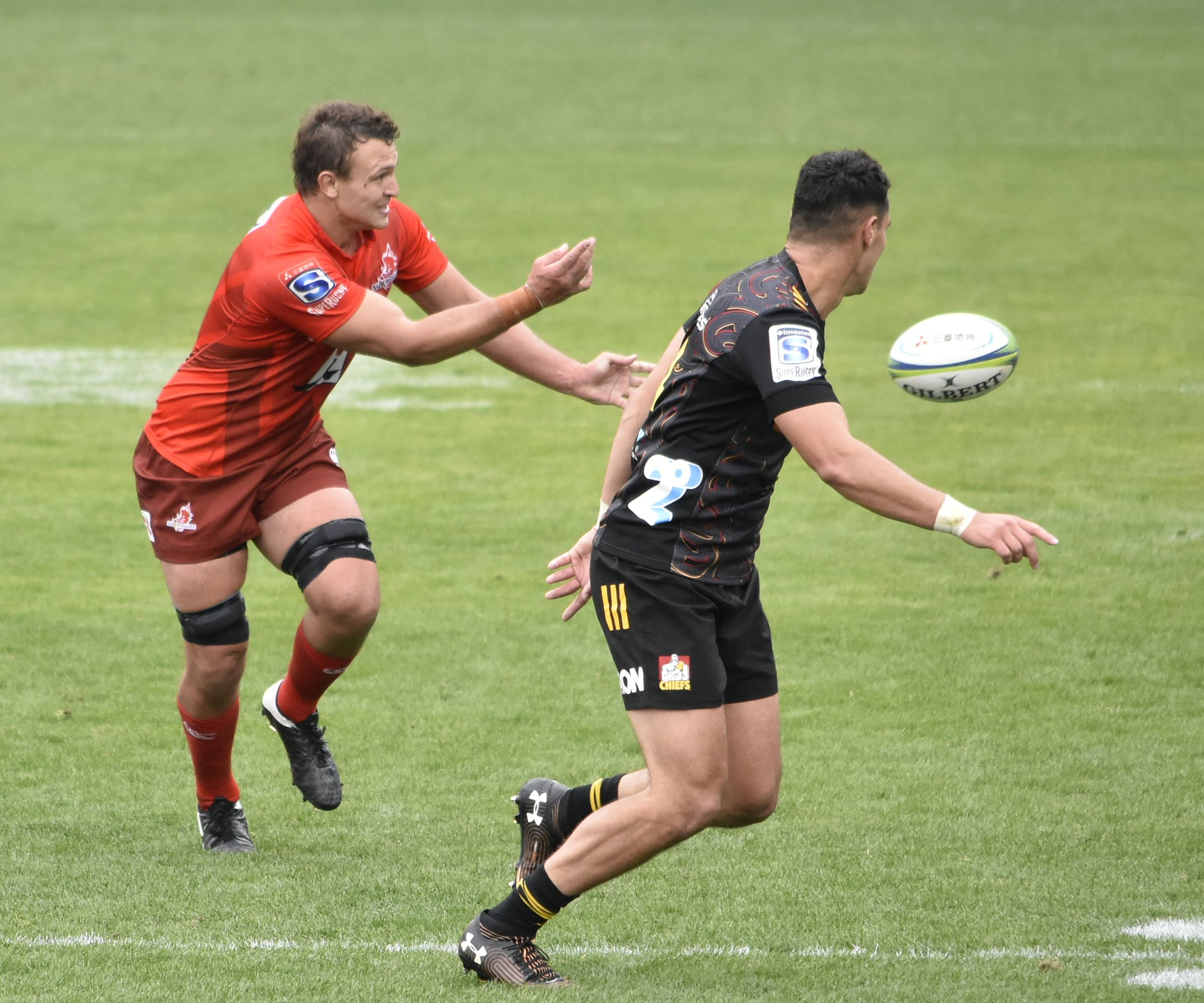
- Born: Jake Schatz; 25 July 1990 (age 36) Springwood, Queensland, Australia
- Height: 190 cm (6 ft 3 in)
- Weight: 110 kg (17 st 5 lb; 243 lb)
- School: ACGS

Rugby union career
- Position: Blindside Flanker / Number 8
- Current team: London Irish
Senior career
Years	Team	Apps	(Points)
2014	Brisbane City	7	(25)
2017−2019	London Irish	31	(0)
- Correct as of 6 November 2017
Super Rugby
Years	Team	Apps	(Points)
2010−2016	Reds	85	(40)
2017	Melbourne Rebels	6	(0)
2019	Sunwolves	6	(0)
- Correct as of 6 November 2017
International career
Years	Team	Apps	(Points)
2014–	Australia	2	(0)
- Correct as of 23 November 2014

Jake Schatz (born 25 July 1990) is an Australian former rugby union player. He mostly played as flanker or Number 8. Schatz made his debut for the Reds during the 2010 Super 14 season. He was educated at John Paul College (Brisbane) and the Anglican Church Grammar School.

Schatz was selected as the 2008 QLD Premier Colts player of the year. He captained Sunnybank to the 2008 QLD Premier Colts premiership.

Schatz toured with the 2008 QLD Reds development squad on their end of season trip to Ireland and France.

Schatz was named captain of the Australian U20 team for the 2010 Junior World Championships in Argentina.

Schatz was awarded the QLD Reds 2010 Rookie of the Year prize.

On 5 June 2017 it was announced that Schatz had signed for London Irish in the English Premiership.

== Super Rugby statistics ==
As of 6 November 2017

Season	Team	Games	Starts	Sub	Mins	Tries	Cons	Pens	Drops	Points	Yel	Red
2010	Reds	9	5	4	450	0	0	0	0	0	0	0
2011	Reds	7	1	6	217	0	0	0	0	0	0	0
2012	Reds	16	12	4	972	0	0	0	0	0	0	0
2013	Reds	17	17	0	1294	4	0	0	0	20	0	0
2014	Reds	16	16	0	1259	2	0	0	0	10	0	0
2015	Reds	13	13	0	949	2	0	0	0	10	0	0
2016	Reds	7	7	0	464	0	0	0	0	0	0	0
2017	Rebels	6	2	4	208	0	0	0	0	0	0	0
Total		91	73	19	5813	8	0	0	0	40	0	0
