= Brendan McKibbin =

Scottish rugby union player

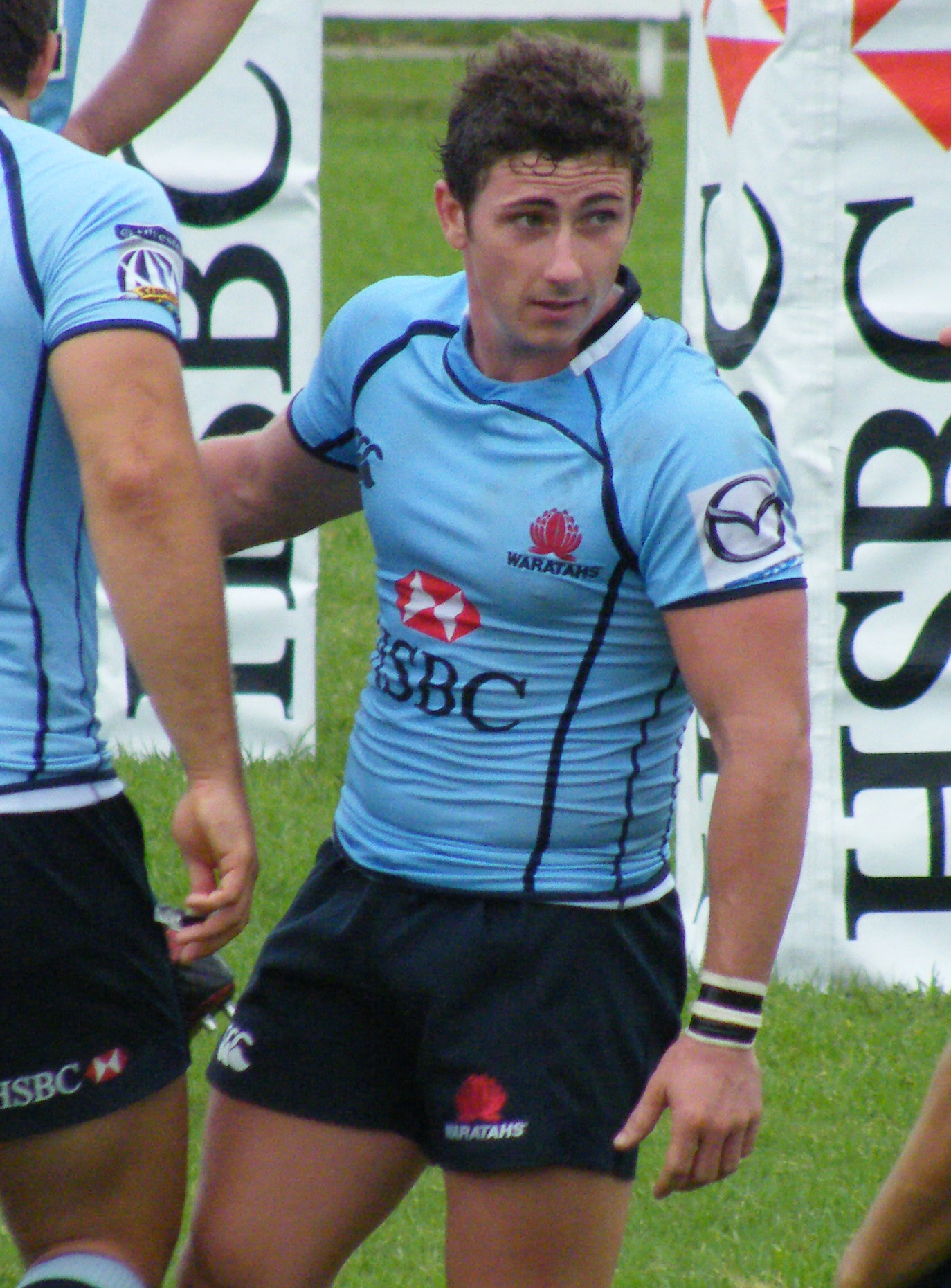
- Born: Brendan McKibbin; 19 September 1985 (age 41) Irvine, North Ayrshire, Scotland
- Height: 1.75 m (5 ft 9 in)
- Weight: 86 kg (13 st 8 lb)
- School: Marist College Ashgrove

Rugby union career
- Position: Scrum-Half
Amateur team(s)
Years	Team	Apps	(Points)
2003–09	Brothers		
2010–	Eastern Suburbs		
Senior career
Years	Team	Apps	(Points)
2007	Ballymore Tornadoes	4	(0)
2014	NSW Country Eagles	7	(10)
2015−	London Irish		
- Correct as of 5 December 2014
Super Rugby
Years	Team	Apps	(Points)
2009	Reds	4	(10)
2011–15	Waratahs	71	(234)
- Correct as of 28 June 2015

Brendan McKibbin (born 19 September 1985) is a retired professional rugby union footballer. He last played for London Irish in the Aviva Premiership. He previously played for the Waratahs and the Queensland Reds in Super Rugby. His regular playing position is scrum-half.

== Early life ==
McKibbin was born in Irvine, Scotland. He spent his early life in Kilmarnock before he moved with his family to Brisbane, Australia when he was three years old. He attended Marist College Ashgrove where he played rugby for the 1st XV.

During his final year at Ashgrove in 2002, he was selected to play for Queensland at the Australian Schools Rugby Championships. McKibbin played open-side flanker at schoolboy and under-19 level, only switching to scrum-half to play senior rugby.

== Rugby career ==
McKibbin was invited to join the Reds Rugby College from the Brothers club in Brisbane. He played for the Queensland U19 side in the Trans Tasman Challenge competition in 2004.

In 2007, he played for the Ballymore Tornadoes in the Australian Rugby Championship, appearing in four matches during the tournament.

The following year, McKibbin scored 223 points for Brothers to be the leading points scorer in Queensland Premier Rugby for the 2008 regular season. His tally was 8 tries, 51 conversions and 27 penalties. Brothers narrowly lost the grand final to Easts in 2008, but McKibbin won the Alec Evans Medal for Premier Player of the Year.

In 2009, he made his Super 14 debut for the Reds against the Chiefs. After winning four caps for the Reds, McKibbin went on to captain Brothers to a hard-fought grand final win over Souths in the Queensland Premier Rugby competition. He also won the Tony Shaw Medal for Player of the Grand Final.

McKibbin moved to Sydney at the end of that year, to take up an opportunity with the Junior Waratahs. He joined the Eastern Suburbs club to play in the Shute Shield competition, and won the 2010 Ken Catchpole Medal for the most outstanding player in Sydney club rugby.

He played limited minutes in Super Rugby for the Waratahs in 2011, but became the team's first choice halfback and goalkicker in 2012. McKibbin was called up to the Wallabies' squad for the last Test match of the year in 2012, being named on the bench for the final match of the Spring Tour, against Wales in Cardiff.

In January 2015 it was announced that McKibbin had signed for then English Premiership club London Irish on a two-year contract from the start of the 2015/16 season.
