= Hugh Pyle =

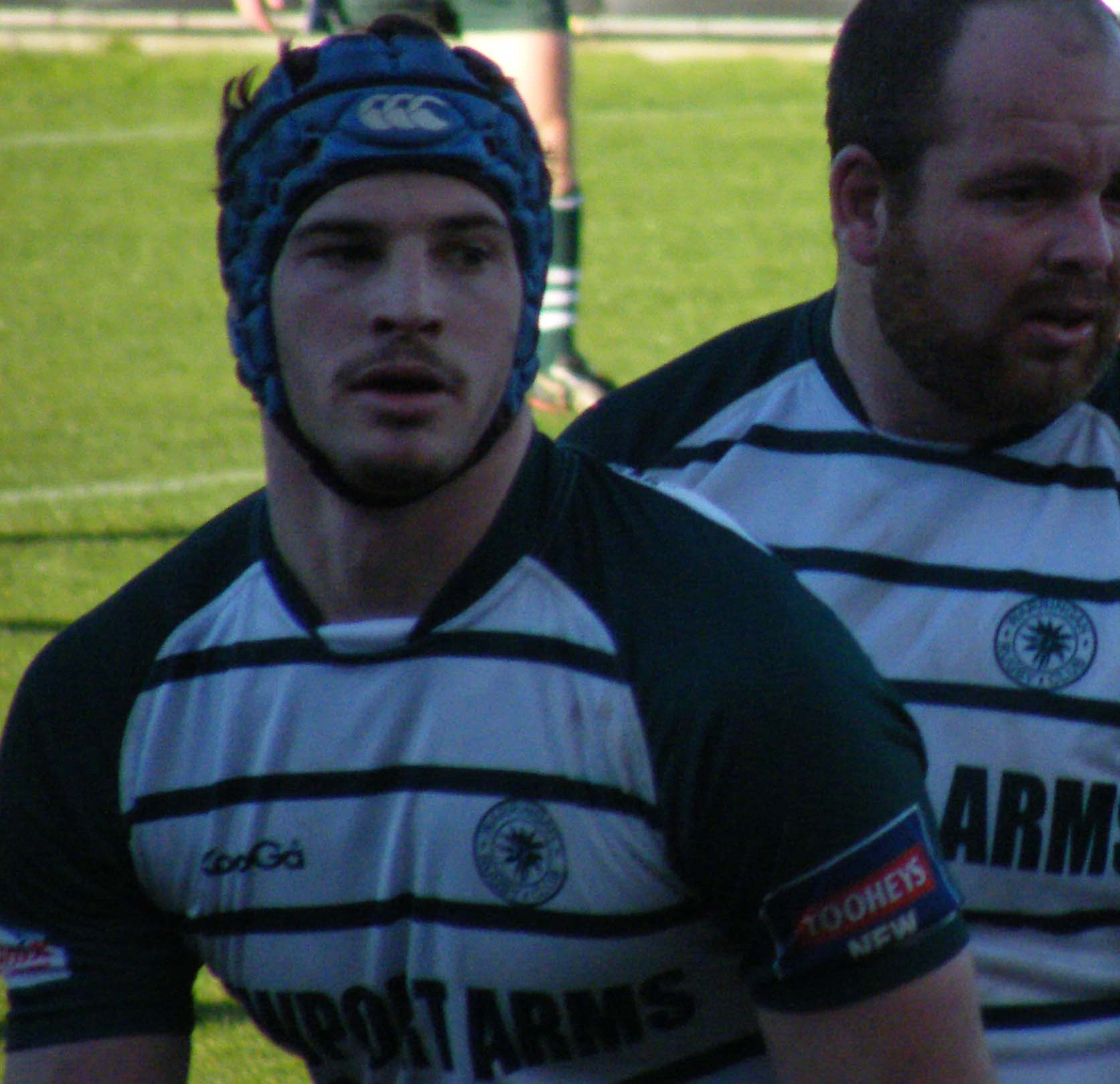
- Born: Hugh Pyle; 21 September 1988 (age 38) Sydney
- Height: 2.01 m (6 ft 7 in)
- Weight: 118 kg (18 st 8 lb)

Rugby union career
- Position: Lock
Senior career
Years	Team	Apps	(Points)
2014–2020	Stade Français	121	(40)
2020–2021	Bayonne	11	(0)
2022–2023	Toshiba Brave Lupus	5	(0)
- Correct as of 26 August 2021
Super Rugby
Years	Team	Apps	(Points)
2011–2014	Rebels	57	(40)
- Correct as of 26 August 2021

Hugh Pyle (born 21 September 1988 in Sydney) is a retired rugby union footballer. His regular playing position is lock. He previously represented the Rebels in Super Rugby making his franchise debut in Round 3 of the 2011 Super Rugby season against the Chiefs.

At the conclusion of the 2014 Super Rugby season he departed Australia to take up a lucrative opportunity with major French rugby club (Stade Français Paris).Now works at ANZ Bank NZ as a Private Banker specialising in investment management based in Christchurch, New Zealand
