= Mahlet Afework =

Ethiopian fashion designer and entrepreneur

- Citizenship: Ethiopian
- Occupations: Fashion designer and entrepreneur
- Known for: Mafi MAfi

Mahlet "Mafi" Afework is an Ethiopian fashion designer and entrepreneur. She is known for her fashion label Mafi MAfi.

== Early years and education ==
Mahlet Afework was supposed to study nursing for two years. But in the middle of her studies, she quit to study Fashion.

== Career ==
Afework began her career at age 16 as a model and musician. While in grade 9, she took interest in rap music and released a single titled Shalom Africa. Aside getting a deal from Yosef Gebre Jossy, a famous recording artiste in Addis Ababa, to record an album, she was also given the opportunity to design clothes for his music video, Jossy In Z House. Through Google and YouTube videos, she learned fashion.

In 2011, she founded Mafi Mafi, an Ethiopian fashion label. She uses hand-woven fabrics made by women from Ethiopia's rural areas to create clothing and accessories. She has collaborated with cult UK designer Markus Lupfer and has exhibited at the London College of Fashion, European Fashion Day in Addis, and Africa Fashion Week New York.

In 2014, she gave a TED Talk about Ancient tradition and modern fashion.

== Awards ==
- 2010: Winner, Designer of the Year award from Alliance Ethio-Française at European Fashion Day in Addis Ababa
- 2012: Winner, Origin Africa's design award at African Fashion Week New York 2012
- 2017: Winner, Creative Futures award

== Personal life ==
As of 2018 Afework is married.
