= Winston Mafi =

Tongan rugby union player

Winston Churchill Mafi
- Born: 21 March 1980 (age 46) Nuku’Alofa, Tonga
- Height: 1.85 m (6 ft 1 in)
- Weight: 98 kg (216 lb; 15.4 st)

Rugby union career
- Position(s): Centre, Wing
Senior career
| Years | Team | Apps | (Points) |
| 2010- | Cavalieri Prato | | |
| 2007–09 | Calvisano | | |
Super Rugby
| Years | Team | Apps | (Points) |
| 2004–06 | Waratahs | | |

Winston Churchill Mafi (born 21 March 1980 in Nukuʻalofa, Tonga) is a Tongan rugby union footballer who usually plays an outside centre. He currently plays for the Rugby Club I Cavalieri Prato club in the Italian Top12. He is the older brother of Alfred Mafi.

In 2000 and 2001 he played for Penrith, before taking two years off to work as a missionary in Victoria. After playing for Sydney University, he was recruited for the Waratahs for their 2004 tour of Argentina. Following the tour he signed a two-year contract. In May 2006 he injured his knee while playing for Eastwood in the Shute Shield final and was sidelined. He was released from the team in 2007.

In June 2010 he extended his contract with Cavalieri.
