= Frank Halai =

New Zealand rugby union player

- Born: 6 March 1988 (age 38) Pangai, Tonga
- Height: 195 cm (6 ft 5 in)
- Weight: 105 kg (231 lb; 16 st 7 lb)
- School: Wesley College

Rugby union career
- Position: Wing
- Current team: Austin Gilgronis
Senior career
Years	Team	Apps	(Points)
2010–2011	Waikato	6	(0)
2012–2015	Counties Manukau	29	(70)
2013–2015	Blues	38	(70)
2015–2017	Wasps	41	(70)
2017–2019	Pau	19	(30)
2020-2021	Austin Gilgronis	12	(15)
- Correct as of 17 August 2021
International career
Years	Team	Apps	(Points)
2013	New Zealand	1	(5)
2013–2014	Barbarian F.C.	3	(5)
2014	New Zealand Barbarians	2	(5)
- Correct as of 17 August 2021
National sevens team
Years	Team		Comps
2011–2012	New Zealand		7
- Correct as of 17 August 2021

Frank Halai (born 6 March 1988) is a Tongan rugby union player who plays as a winger for the Austin Gilgronis in Major League Rugby (MLR).

He previously played for Pau in the Top 14. and for Counties Manukau in the ITM Cup, and before that Waikato. Halai is a former All Black Sevens and All Black representative, having played one test match in 2013.

== Career ==
Halai made his Super Rugby debut in Round 1 of the 2013 season when he started on the wing and played all 80 minutes of a 34–20 win over the Hurricanes in Wellington, scoring a try in the process. He ended the season as the Super Rugby leading try scorer with 10, and was third in line breaks with 21, behind his Blues teammates Rene Ranger and Charles Piutau who had 24 each.

On 16 March 2017, Halai leaves Wasps in England for French club Pau in the Top 14 from the 2017–18 season.
