= Alfie Mafi =

Alifeleti Mafi
- Born: Alifeleti Mafi; 8 June 1988 (age 38) Tongatapu, Tonga
- Height: 1.82 m (5 ft 11 1/2 in)
- Weight: 95 kg (14 st 13 lb)
- School: Granville Boys High School, NSW

Rugby union career
- Position: Fullback / Wing
Senior career
Years	Team	Apps	(Points)
2007	Sydney Fleet	5	(15)
2013–2018	Brive	67	(50)
2018–	Albi	33	(70)
- Correct as of 11 May 2021
Super Rugby
Years	Team	Apps	(Points)
2008	Waratahs	9	(0)
2009–2010	Brumbies	6	(5)
2011–2013	Force	37	(50)
- Correct as of 11 May 2021
International career
Years	Team	Apps	(Points)
2007	Australia U19		
2006	Australian Schools		
National sevens team
Years	Team		Comps
2007	Australia		2

Alfie Mafi (born 8 June 1988) is a former Australian professional rugby union football player of Tongan descent. His usual position was wing. Mafi represented Australia in rugby sevens and at under-19 level at the IRB World Championships. He played Super Rugby for the Waratahs, Brumbies, and Force. He last played in the French Top 14 league for Brive.

== Early life ==
Mafi was born in Tongatapu, Tonga and moved to Australia with his family in 1997. He attended Granville Boys High School in Sydney and played for the Australian Schoolboys rugby team in 2006. He is the younger brother of Winston Mafi.

== Rugby career ==
Mafi was a member of the New South Wales Waratahs squad in 2007, and played for the Sydney Fleet in the Australian Rugby Championship. He played for Australia at the 2007 Under 19 Rugby World Championship in Belfast in 2007 and scored the try that sealed the win over Wales in the play-off for third place.

He was also selected for the Australian Sevens squad during the 2007–08 IRB Sevens World Series, playing in the Dubai and South Africa tournaments.

Mafi made his Super 14 debut for the Waratahs in 2008 and was selected for the Australia under 20 team later that year but was forced to withdraw due to an ankle injury.

He moved to the Brumbies where he has played in 2009 and 2010. Mafi joined the Force where he played from 2011 to 2013. Despite strong performances in 2013, he was axed mid-season for "a number of infringements of team standards and disciplinary indiscretions".

It was reported that he would join Japanese Top League side Honda Heat but he finally signed with Brive on a one-year deal with a one-year option.
