= Patrick Dellit =

Australian rugby union footballer

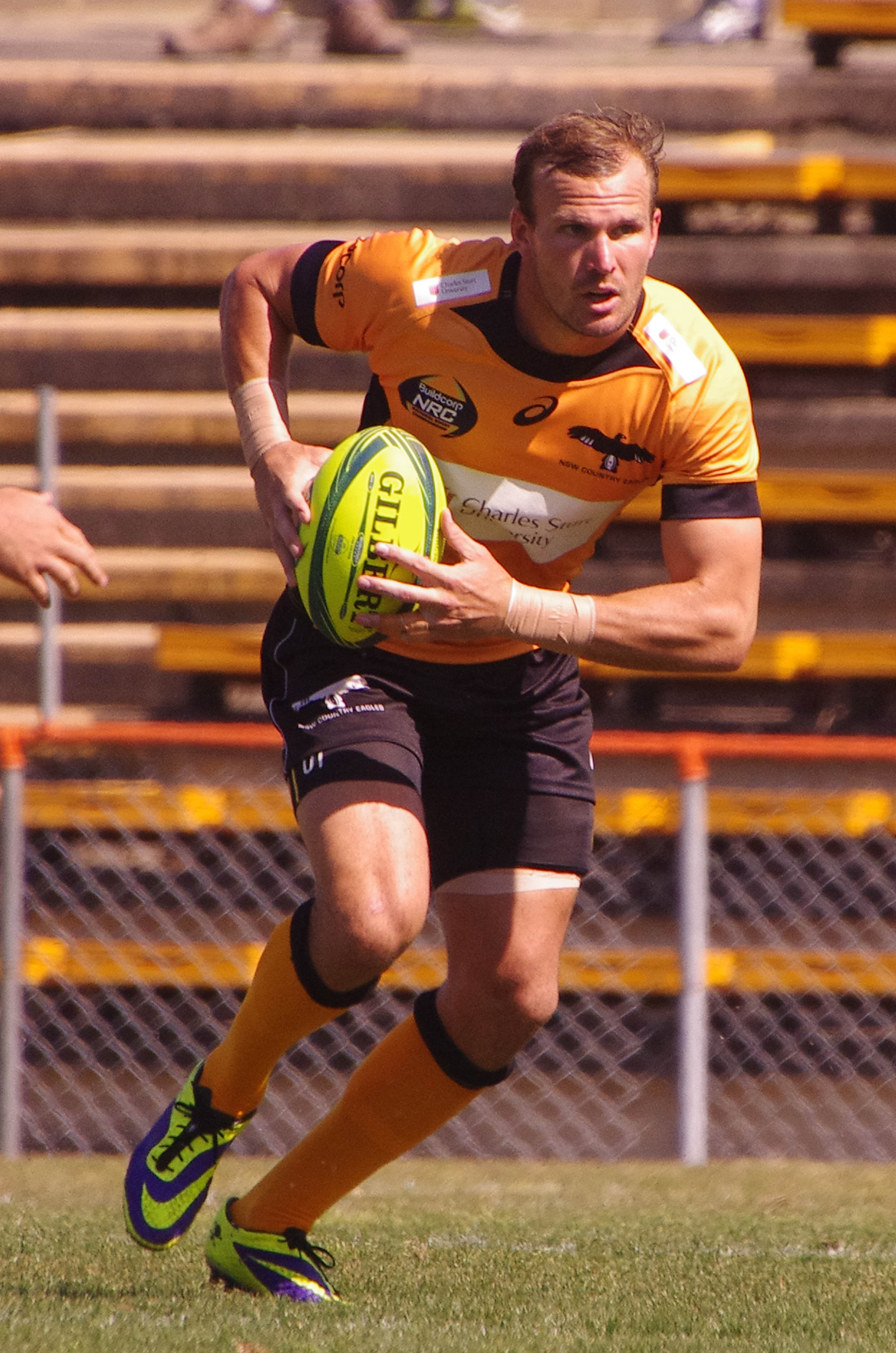
- Born: Patrick Dellit; 21 August 1986 (age 40) Sydney, Australia
- Height: 1.92 m (6 ft 3 1/2 in)
- Weight: 100 kg (15 st 10 lb)
- School: All Saints College, St Mary's Campus Maitland

Rugby union career
- Position: Centre / Wing
- Current team: Nedlands, WA; Eastern Suburbs, NSW
Senior career
| Years | Team | Apps | (Points) |
| 2014– | NSW Country Eagles | 8 | (5) |
- Correct as of 1 December 2014
Super Rugby
| Years | Team | Apps | (Points) |
| 2011– | Force | 40 | (15) |
- Correct as of 12 June 2015

Patrick Dellit (born 21 August 1986) is an Australian rugby union footballer. His regular playing position is either as a centre or a winger. He currently represents the Western Force in Super Rugby. He made his debut for the franchise during the 2011 Super Rugby season against the Lions in Johannesburg.

== Super Rugby statistics ==
As of 16 June 2015

| Season | Team | Games | Starts | Sub | Mins | Tries | Cons | Pens | Drops | Points | Yel | Red |
|---|---|---|---|---|---|---|---|---|---|---|---|---|
| 2011 | Force | 12 | 9 | 3 | 695 | 0 | 0 | 0 | 0 | 0 | 0 | 0 |
| 2012 | Force | 5 | 3 | 2 | 274 | 0 | 0 | 0 | 0 | 0 | 0 | 0 |
| 2013 | Force | 14 | 13 | 1 | 1054 | 3 | 0 | 0 | 0 | 15 | 0 | 0 |
| 2014 | Force | 6 | 4 | 2 | 305 | 0 | 0 | 0 | 0 | 0 | 0 | 0 |
| 2015 | Force | 3 | 0 | 3 | 19 | 0 | 0 | 0 | 0 | 0 | 0 | 0 |
| Total | | 40 | 29 | 11 | 2347 | 3 | 0 | 0 | 0 | 15 | 0 | 0 |
