= Rene Ranger =

New Zealand international rugby union player

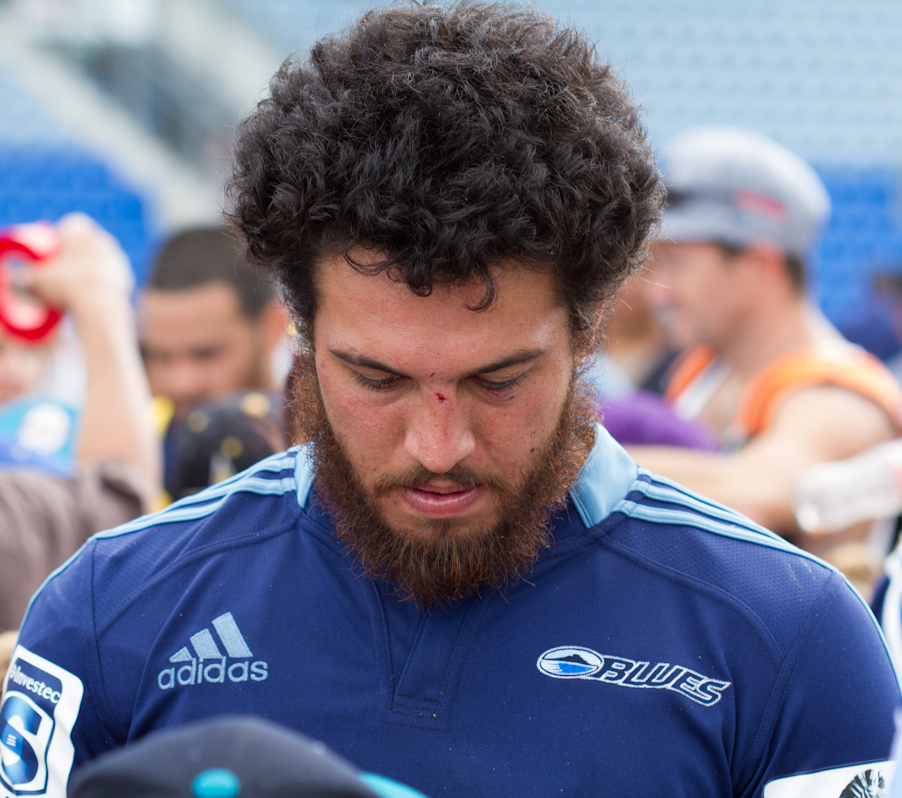
- Ranger after a pre season match for the Blues, February 2013
- Full name: Rene Mark Nelson Ranger
- Born: 30 September 1986 (age 40) Whangārei, New Zealand
- Height: 183 cm (6 ft 0 in)
- Weight: 102 kg (225 lb; 16 st 1 lb)
- School: Mahurangi College

Rugby union career
- Position(s): Centre, Wing
Senior career
Years	Team	Apps	(Points)
2006–2013, 2017–2018, 2020–2023	Northland	116	(110)
2009–2013, 2016–2017	Blues	76	(140)
2013–2015	Montpellier	38	(35)
2017–2018	La Rochelle	7	(0)
2018	Hino Red Dolphins	3	(5)
2019	Sunwolves	1	(0)
2020	Colorado Raptors	4	(10)
2021	Crusaders	0	(0)
- Correct as of 30 September 2023
International career
Years	Team	Apps	(Points)
2009	Junior All Blacks	3	(10)
2010–2013	New Zealand	6	(5)
2010	New Zealand Barbarians	1	(0)
2014	Barbarian F.C.	1	(0)
2014	World XV	1	(0)
- Correct as of 30 September 2023
National sevens team
Years	Team		Comps
2006–2008	New Zealand		
- Correct as of 23 August 2021

Rene Mark Nelson Ranger (born 30 September 1986) is a former New Zealand rugby union player. Ranger played the positions of wing and centre.

He made his debut for New Zealand on 26 June 2010 after a superb season with the Blues. He was known for his aggressive style of play and strong running.

== Career ==
=== Provincial ===
Ranger made his debut for the Northland Taniwha on 22 July 2006 against North Harbour. He went on to play a further nine games for the team that season and continued to play for the union. Ranger grew up playing for Wellsford, and is currently the club's first and only All Black.

=== Super Rugby ===
In 2007 Ranger was selected as a member of the Blues Wider Training Group. Following his form for the Taniwha he was signed by the Blues for 2009. Ranger made his Super 14 debut in the Blues 13 February victory over the Western Force in Perth. Ranger was suspended for one match following a late and high tackle in the Blues 2009 loss to the Bulls in Pretoria.

Ranger returned to the side in 2016 and was named on the bench for the season opener against the Highlanders.

=== Sevens ===
In 2006 Ranger was selected by Gordon Tietjens to represent the New Zealand Sevens team at the Dubai and South Africa tournaments in December. In 2007 he was again selected to play for the New Zealand sevens team in Dubai and South Africa. Having failed to win selection in a Super 14 squad for 2008, Ranger continued to represent New Zealand in sevens, playing in the first four tournaments of the year before joining back up with Northland for the Air New Zealand Cup.

=== International ===
Ranger was selected for the Junior All Blacks on the back of his form for the Blues in the 2009 season.

In June 2010, Ranger was called into the All Blacks training squad alongside Ben Smith as injury cover. He then made his test debut off the bench in the second test against South Africa, with his performance standing out enough to be named in the All Blacks squad for the Tri Nations. Ranger scored a try during his second test for the All Blacks against The Springboks, on 17 July 2010 as the All Blacks won 31–17 at the Westpac Stadium in Wellington.

After a strong start to the 2013 Super Rugby season, Ranger was named in the All Blacks wider training squad and came off the bench in the first two tests against France before starting the final test.

=== Abroad ===
Later, Ranger signed a contract with Montpellier. All Blacks Coach Steve Hansen stated that in spite of this he would have selected Rene Ranger for the Rugby Championship. However, Ranger made himself unavailable for the All Blacks. He cited personal reasons for withdrawing from the squad. Instead Ranger captained Northland in the ITM Cup. Northland performed poorly through the season, ending up second from the bottom of the table with two wins, a draw and seven losses.

After a successful season with Montpellier, with Montpellier reaching the semi-finals of the Top 14 but being beaten by Castres at Lille, Ranger was invited to play for the Barbarians against an England 15 at Twickenham. Although he didn't score he played very well, and set up one of Hosea Gear's tries – the final result was Barbarians 39, England 29.

After two seasons with, and initial resistance from Montpellier, Ranger gained an early release from his contract and announced his intention to return to New Zealand to play for North Harbour in the 2015 ITM Cup and rejoin the Blues for the 2016 season. He also focused on pushing for an All Blacks recall. His return to New Zealand rugby was hampered by slow recovery from neck surgery, which precluded his participation in the North Harbour ITM Cup campaign.

In 2020, Ranger signed on to play for the Colorado Raptors of Major League Rugby. However, with the suspension of the season due to the ongoing COVID-19 pandemic, Ranger returned to New Zealand.

=== Return to New Zealand ===
Ranger re-signed with Northland for the 2020 Mitre 10 Cup season. Despite being unfancied by many, Northland performed well to make the Championship final where they fell 36–24 to Hawke's Bay. Ranger was praised during the season for numerous good performances as part of Northland's run.

After injuries to George Bridge and Manasa Mataele, Ranger earned a place in the Crusaders side for the 2021 Super Rugby Aotearoa season as injury cover. Upon signing, Ranger commented that "chucking on the red jersey was a bit intimidating at times" in reference to his long association with the Blues. While Ranger did not play a game during the 2021 season, the team went on to win the competition.

In Round 5 of the 2021 Bunnings NPC Ranger played his 100th game for Northland against Waikato in Whangārei in 38–28 win for the Taniwha.

== Honours ==
Crusaders:

1x Super Rugby Aotearoa (2021)

All Blacks:

1x Rugby Championship (2010)

== Controversy ==
Ranger was charged with assault following an altercation north of Auckland on 18 April 2009. The New Zealand Rugby Union suspended him for one match, and he was officially warned and directed to complete an alcohol counselling programme. However, at trial in 2012 Ranger was found not guilty of assault.
