= List of 2018–19 Super Rugby transfers (South Africa) =

This is a list of player movements for Super Rugby teams prior to the end of the 2019 Super Rugby season. Departure and arrivals of all players that were included in a Super Rugby squad for 2018 or 2019 are listed here, regardless of when it occurred. Future-dated transfers are only included if confirmed by the player or his agent, his former team or his new team.

== Bulls ==
Bulls transfers 2018–2019
Pos	2018 squad	Out	In	2019 squad
PR	Matthys Basson; Lizo Gqoboka; Simphiwe Matanzima (did not play); Nqoba Mxoli; Trevor Nyakane; Pierre Schoeman; Mornay Smith; Conraad van Vuuren; Frans van Wyk	(substituted off) Pierre Schoeman (to (Scotland) Edinburgh); (substituted off) Mornay Smith (to Blue Bulls); (substituted off) Frans van Wyk (to Lions)	(substituted in) Wiehahn Herbst (from (Ireland) Ulster); (substituted in) Madot Mabokela (from Blue Bulls); (substituted in) Dayan van der Westhuizen (from Blue Bulls)	Matthys Basson (did not play); Lizo Gqoboka; Wiehahn Herbst; Madot Mabokela (did not play); Simphiwe Matanzima; Nqoba Mxoli (did not play); Trevor Nyakane; Dayan van der Westhuizen; Conraad van Vuuren
HK	Johan Grobbelaar; Edgar Marutlulle; Adriaan Strauss; Jaco Visagie	(substituted off) Adriaan Strauss (retired)	(substituted in) Schalk Brits (from (England) Saracens); (substituted in) Corniel Els (from Blue Bulls)	Schalk Brits; Corniel Els (short-term); Johan Grobbelaar; Edgar Marutlulle (did not play); Jaco Visagie
LK	Lood de Jager; Aston Fortuin (did not play); Jason Jenkins; Ruan Nortjé; RG Snyman; Hendré Stassen; Ruben van Heerden	(substituted off) Aston Fortuin (to Blue Bulls); (substituted off) Ruan Nortjé (to Blue Bulls); (substituted off) Ruben van Heerden (to Sharks)	(substituted in) Eli Snyman (from Blue Bulls)	Lood de Jager; Jason Jenkins; Eli Snyman (short-term); RG Snyman; Hendré Stassen (did not play)
FL	Shaun Adendorff; Tim Agaba; Thembelani Bholi; Nick de Jager; Jannes Kirsten; Roelof Smit; Ruan Steenkamp (did not play); Marco van Staden	(substituted off) Shaun Adendorff (to (France) Aurillac)	(substituted in) Carel du Preez (from Blue Bulls); (substituted in) Paul Schoeman (from Cheetahs); (substituted in) Muller Uys (from Western Province U21)	Tim Agaba; Thembelani Bholi; Nick de Jager (did not play); Carel du Preez (did not play); Jannes Kirsten; Paul Schoeman; Roelof Smit; Ruan Steenkamp; Muller Uys (did not play); Marco van Staden
N8	Hanro Liebenberg		(substituted in) Jano Venter (from Blue Bulls); (substituted in) Duane Vermeulen (from (Japan) Kubota Spears)	Hanro Liebenberg; Jano Venter (did not play); Duane Vermeulen
SH	Embrose Papier; Ivan van Zyl; André Warner		(substituted in) Theo Maree (from Blue Bulls)	Theo Maree (did not play); Embrose Papier; Ivan van Zyl; André Warner
FH	Marnitz Boshoff; Boeta Hamman; Manie Libbok; Handré Pollard	(substituted off) Boeta Hamman (to Blue Bulls)	(substituted in) Chris Smith (from Pumas)	Marnitz Boshoff (did not play); Manie Libbok; Handré Pollard; Chris Smith (short-term, did not play)
CE	Francois Brummer; JT Jackson; Johnny Kôtze; Jesse Kriel; Burger Odendaal; Dries Swanepoel	(substituted off) Francois Brummer (to (Italy) Zebre); (substituted off) Dries Swanepoel (to Cheetahs)	(substituted in) Stedman Gans (from South Africa Sevens); (substituted in) Dylan Sage (from South Africa Sevens)	Stedman Gans (did not play); JT Jackson; Johnny Kôtze; Jesse Kriel; Burger Odendaal; Dylan Sage
WG	Travis Ismaiel; Duncan Matthews; Jade Stighling (did not play); Jamba Ulengo	(substituted off) Jamba Ulengo (to Blue Bulls)	(substituted in) Cornal Hendricks (unattached); (substituted in) Rosko Specman (from South Africa Sevens)	Cornal Hendricks; Travis Ismaiel (did not play); Duncan Matthews (did not play); Rosko Specman; Jade Stighling
FB	Warrick Gelant; Divan Rossouw			Warrick Gelant; Divan Rossouw
Coach	John Mitchell	(substituted off) John Mitchell (to England (defence coach))	(substituted in) Pote Human (from Blue Bulls)	Pote Human

== Lions ==
Lions transfers 2018–2019
Pos	2018 squad	Out	In	2019 squad
PR	Jacobie Adriaanse; Ruan Dreyer; Corné Fourie; Johannes Jonker; Sti Sithole; Dylan Smith; Jacques van Rooyen	(substituted off) Ruan Dreyer (to (England) Gloucester); (substituted off) Corné Fourie (to Stormers); (substituted off) Jacques van Rooyen (to (England) Bath)	(substituted in) Chergin Fillies (from Golden Lions); (substituted in) Nathan McBeth (from Goldon Lions U21); (substituted in) Danie Mienie (from (France) Toulouse); (substituted in) Carlü Sadie (from Stormers); (substituted in) Frans van Wyk (from Bulls)	Jacobie Adriaanse; Chergin Fillies (did not play); Johannes Jonker; Nathan McBeth; Danie Mienie (did not play); Carlü Sadie; Sti Sithole; Dylan Smith; Frans van Wyk
HK	Robbie Coetzee; Malcolm Marx		(substituted in) Jan-Henning Campher (from Blue Bulls); (substituted in) Pieter Jansen (from Golden Lions)	Jan-Henning Campher; Robbie Coetzee; Pieter Jansen; Malcolm Marx
LK	Lourens Erasmus; Andries Ferreira; Rhyno Herbst (did not play); Robert Kruger; Franco Mostert; Marvin Orie	(substituted off) Andries Ferreira (to (New Zealand) Hurricanes); (substituted off) Franco Mostert (to (England) Gloucester)	(substituted in) Stephan Lewies (from Sharks); (substituted in) Reinhard Nothnagel (from Golden Lions); (substituted in) PJ Steenkamp (from Golden Lions); (substituted in) Wilhelm van der Sluys (from (England) Exeter Chiefs); (substituted in) Ruan Vermaak (from Golden Lions XV)	Lourens Erasmus (did not play); Rhyno Herbst; Robert Kruger; Stephan Lewies; Reinhard Nothnagel; Marvin Orie; PJ Steenkamp (did not play); Wilhelm van der Sluys; Ruan Vermaak
FL	Cyle Brink; Hacjivah Dayimani; Jaco Kriel (did not play); Len Massyn; Marnus Schoeman; Kwagga Smith	(substituted off) Jaco Kriel (to (England) Gloucester)	(substituted in) Vincent Tshituka (from Golden Lions); (substituted in) James Venter (from Golden Lions)	Cyle Brink; Hacjivah Dayimani; Len Massyn (did not play); Marnus Schoeman; Kwagga Smith; Vincent Tshituka; James Venter
N8	Willie Engelbrecht (did not play); Warren Whiteley	(substituted off) Willie Engelbrecht (to Pumas)	(substituted in) Jo-Hanko de Villiers (from Golden Lions)	Jo-Hanko de Villiers (did not play); Warren Whiteley
SH	Ross Cronjé; Nic Groom (short-term); Marco Jansen van Vuren; Christiaan Meyer (did not play); Dillon Smit	(substituted off) Marco Jansen van Vuren (to South Africa Sevens); (substituted off) Christiaan Meyer (to Griquas)	(substituted in) Bradley Thain (from Golden Lions); (substituted in) Morné van den Berg (from Golden Lions XV)	Ross Cronjé; Nic Groom; Dillon Smit; Bradley Thain (did not play); Morné van den Berg (did not play)
FH	Ashlon Davids; Elton Jantjies; Shaun Reynolds	(substituted off) Ashlon Davids (to Pumas)	(substituted in) Eddie Fouché (from Golden Lions XV)	Eddie Fouché (did not play); Elton Jantjies; Shaun Reynolds
CE	Rohan Janse van Rensburg; Lionel Mapoe; Howard Mnisi; Harold Vorster	(substituted off) Rohan Janse van Rensburg (to (England) Sale Sharks); (substituted off) Howard Mnisi (to Golden Lions)	(substituted in) Jan-Louis la Grange (from Golden Lions); (substituted in) Franco Naudé (from Blue Bulls); (substituted in) Manuel Rass (from Golden Lions); (substituted in) Wandisile Simelane (from Golden Lions); (substituted in) Wayne van der Bank (from Golden Lions XV); (substituted in) Lourens van der Schyff (from Golden Lions U21)	Jan-Louis la Grange (did not play); Lionel Mapoe; Franco Naudé (short-term); Manuel Rass (did not play); Wandisile Simelane; Wayne van der Bank (did not play); Lourens van der Schyff (did not play); Harold Vorster
WG	Ruan Combrinck; Aphiwe Dyantyi; Courtnall Skosan; Madosh Tambwe		(substituted in) Tyrone Green (from Golden Lions)	Ruan Combrinck; Aphiwe Dyantyi; Tyrone Green; Courtnall Skosan; Madosh Tambwe (did not play)
FB	Andries Coetzee; Sylvian Mahuza		(substituted in) Gianni Lombard (from Golden Lions)	Andries Coetzee; Gianni Lombard; Sylvian Mahuza
Coach	Swys de Bruin		(substituted in) Ivan van Rooyen (from Golden Lions)	Swys de Bruin; Ivan van Rooyen (short-term)

== Sharks ==
Sharks transfers 2018–2019
Pos	2018 squad	Out	In	2019 squad
PR	Thomas du Toit; Ross Geldenhuys; Mzamo Majola; Khutha Mchunu (did not play); John-Hubert Meyer; Tendai Mtawarira; Coenie Oosthuizen (did not play); Juan Schoeman	(substituted off) Ross Geldenhuys (to (New Zealand) Hurricanes)		Thomas du Toit; Mzamo Majola; Khutha Mchunu; John-Hubert Meyer; Tendai Mtawarira; Coenie Oosthuizen; Juan Schoeman
HK	Franco Marais; Chiliboy Ralepelle; Akker van der Merwe; Kerron van Vuuren (did not play)	(substituted off) Franco Marais (to (England) Gloucester)	(substituted in) Craig Burden (unattached); (substituted in) Cullen Collopy (from Sharks); (substituted in) Fez Mbatha (from Sharks U21)	Craig Burden (short-term); Cullen Collopy (short-term); Fez Mbatha; Chiliboy Ralepelle (did not play); Akker van der Merwe; Kerron van Vuuren
LK	Hyron Andrews; Ruan Botha; Jean Droste (did not play); Gideon Koegelenberg; Stephan Lewies	(substituted off) Jean Droste (to (Japan) Kubota Spears); (substituted off) Stephan Lewies (to Lions)	(substituted in) Andrew Evans (from Sharks); (substituted in) JJ van der Mescht (from Sharks); (substituted in) Ruben van Heerden (from Bulls)	Hyron Andrews; Ruan Botha; Andrew Evans (did not play); Gideon Koegelenberg; JJ van der Mescht; Ruben van Heerden
FL	Keegan Daniel; Jean-Luc du Preez; Tera Mtembu; Tyler Paul; Jacques Vermeulen; Wian Vosloo	(substituted off) Keegan Daniel (retired)	(substituted in) Phepsi Buthelezi (from Sharks); (substituted in) Kwanda Dimaza (from Sharks); (substituted in) Dylan Richardson (from Sharks U21); (substituted in) Luke Stringer (from Sharks)	Phepsi Buthelezi; Kwanda Dimaza (did not play); Jean-Luc du Preez; Tera Mtembu (did not play); Tyler Paul; Dylan Richardson; Luke Stringer; Jacques Vermeulen; Wian Vosloo
N8	Dan du Preez; Philip van der Walt			Dan du Preez; Philip van der Walt
SH	Michael Claassens (did not play); Louis Schreuder; Grant Williams; Cameron Wright	(substituted off) Michael Claassens (retired)	(substituted in) Zee Mkhabela (from Sharks); (substituted in) Sanele Nohamba (from Sharks XV)	Zee Mkhabela (short-term); Sanele Nohamba (did not play); Louis Schreuder; Grant Williams; Cameron Wright
FH	Garth April; Curwin Bosch; Robert du Preez	(substituted off) Garth April (to (Japan) NTT Communications Shining Arcs)		Curwin Bosch; Robert du Preez
CE	Lukhanyo Am; Tristan Blewett (did not play); Johan Deysel (did not play); André Esterhuizen; Marius Louw; Jeremy Ward (did not play)	(substituted off) Tristan Blewett (to Southern Kings); (substituted off) Johan Deysel (to (France) Colomiers)		Lukhanyo Am; Andre Esterhuizen; Marius Louw; Jeremy Ward
WG	Makazole Mapimpi; Lwazi Mvovo; S'busiso Nkosi; Kobus van Wyk; Leolin Zas (did not play)		(substituted in) Muller du Plessis (from South Africa Sevens); (substituted in) Aphelele Fassi (from Sharks)	Muller du Plessis (did not play); Aphelele Fassi; Makazole Mapimpi; Lwazi Mvovo; S'busiso Nkosi; Kobus van Wyk; Leolin Zas (did not play)
FB	Rhyno Smith (did not play); Courtney Winnaar (did not play)			Rhyno Smith; Courtney Winnaar (did not play)
Coach	Robert du Preez			Robert du Preez

== Stormers ==
Stormers transfers 2018–2019
Pos	2018 squad	Out	In	2019 squad
PR	Neethling Fouché; JC Janse van Rensburg; Steven Kitshoff; Wilco Louw; Frans Malherbe; Caylib Oosthuizen (did not play); Carlü Sadie; Alistair Vermaak (did not play)	(substituted off) JC Janse van Rensburg (to (France) Grenoble); (substituted off) Caylib Oosthuizen (to Western Province); (substituted off) Carlü Sadie (to Lions)	(substituted in) Kwenzo Blose (from Western Province U21); (substituted in) Corné Fourie (from Lions); (substituted in) Michael Kumbirai (from Western Province); (substituted in) Lee-Marvin Mazibuko (from Western Province U21)	Kwenzo Blose (did not play); Neethling Fouché; Corné Fourie; Steven Kitshoff; Michael Kumbirai; Wilco Louw; Frans Malherbe; Lee-Marvin Mazibuko (did not play); Alistair Vermaak
HK	Bongi Mbonambi; Dean Muir; Scarra Ntubeni; Ramone Samuels	(substituted off) Dean Muir (to (Japan) Kintetsu Liners)	(substituted in) Dan Jooste (from Western Province); (substituted in) Chad Solomon (from Western Province)	Dan Jooste (short-term); Bongi Mbonambi; Scarra Ntubeni; Ramone Samuels (did not play); Chad Solomon
LK	Jan de Klerk; Pieter-Steph du Toit; Eben Etzebeth (did not play); Salmaan Moerat; JD Schickerling; Chris van Zyl; Eduard Zandberg (did not play)	(substituted off) Jan de Klerk (to (Japan) Canon Eagles); (substituted off) Eduard Zandberg (released)	(substituted in) David Meihuizen (from Western Province); (substituted in) Ernst van Rhyn (from Western Province)	Pieter-Steph du Toit; Eben Etzebeth; David Meihuizen (short-term); Salmaan Moerat; JD Schickerling; Ernst van Rhyn; Chris van Zyl
FL	Stephan de Wit (did not play); Johan du Toit; Siya Kolisi; Sikhumbuzo Notshe; Cobus Wiese	(substituted off) Stephan de Wit (to Southern Kings)	(substituted in) Chris Massyn (from Western Province U21); (substituted in) Marno Redelinghuys (from Western Province); (substituted in) Nama Xaba (from Western Province U21)	Johan du Toit; Siya Kolisi; Chris Massyn; Sikhumbuzo Notshe; Marno Redelinghuys (short-term); Cobus Wiese; Nama Xaba (did not play)
N8	Juarno Augustus; Nizaam Carr; Jaco Coetzee; Kobus van Dyk	(substituted off) Nizaam Carr (to (England) Wasps)		Juarno Augustus; Jaco Coetzee; Kobus van Dyk
SH	Paul de Wet; Dewaldt Duvenage; Herschel Jantjies; Justin Phillips; Jano Vermaak	(substituted off) Dewaldt Duvenage (to (Italy) Benetton)		Paul de Wet (did not play); Herschel Jantjies; Justin Phillips; Jano Vermaak
FH	Jean-Luc du Plessis; Joshua Stander; George Whitehead; Damian Willemse	(substituted off) George Whitehead (to Griquas)		Jean-Luc du Plessis; Joshua Stander; Damian Willemse
CE	Damian de Allende; Daniël du Plessis (did not play); JJ Engelbrecht; Dan Kriel (did not play); EW Viljoen		(substituted in) Ruhan Nel (from South Africa Sevens)	Damian de Allende; Daniël du Plessis; JJ Engelbrecht; Dan Kriel; Ruhan Nel; EW Viljoen
WG	Dillyn Leyds; Sergeal Petersen (did not play); Raymond Rhule; Seabelo Senatla	(substituted off) Raymond Rhule (to (France) Grenoble)	(substituted in) Duncan Saal (from Western Province); (substituted in) Edwill van der Merwe (from Western Province)	Dillyn Leyds; Sergeal Petersen; Duncan Saal (did not play); Seabelo Senatla; Edwill van der Merwe
FB	Craig Barry; SP Marais			Craig Barry; SP Marais
Coach	Robbie Fleck			Robbie Fleck

== See also ==
- List of 2018–19 Premiership Rugby transfers
- List of 2018–19 Pro14 transfers
- List of 2018–19 Top 14 transfers
- List of 2018–19 RFU Championship transfers
- SANZAAR
- Super Rugby franchise areas
