= Vainon Willis =

South African rugby union player

- Full name: Vainon Shanon Willis
- Born: 11 October 1988 (age 38) Cape Town
- Height: 1.84 m (6 ft 1/2 in)
- Weight: 93 kg (14 st 9 lb; 205 lb)
- School: Waterkloof High School
- University: Tshwane University of Technology

Rugby union career
- Position: Winger
Youth career
- 2004–2008: Blue Bulls
Amateur team(s)
Years	Team	Apps	(Points)
2008–2009	TUT Vikings	11	(15)
2013	UP Tuks	7	(10)
Senior career
Years	Team	Apps	(Points)
2007–2010	Blue Bulls	11	(10)
2010	→ Pumas	9	(10)
2011–2012	Leopards	27	(15)
2012	Boland Cavaliers	3	(10)
2013	Blue Bulls	1	(5)
2014–2015	Golden Lions	11	(10)
- Correct as of 2 November 2015
International career
Years	Team	Apps	(Points)
2005–2006	S.A. Schools		
2007	South Africa Under-19		
2008	South Africa Under-20	4	(5)
2013	South African Barbarians		
- Correct as of 9 May 2013

Vainon Shanon Willis (born 11 October 1988) is a retired South African rugby union player, who most recently played with the Golden Lions. His regular position is winger.

== Career ==
=== Youth level ===
He represented Blue Bulls at youth level between 2004 (at the Under-16 Grant Khomo Week) and 2009 (in the Under-21 Provincial Championship competition).

=== Provincial Rugby ===
He was included in the Blue Bulls senior squad for the 2009 Vodacom Cup competition and made his first class debut in their Vodacom Cup match against the Leopards.

Despite being a regular during the 2009 Vodacom Cup campaign, he failed to break into the Currie Cup squad and he joined the Pumas for a short spell for the 2010 Currie Cup Premier Division season.

He then joined the Leopards at the start of 2011, where he played several games before a short spell at Boland Cavaliers in the 2012 Currie Cup First Division.

He rejoined the Blue Bulls in 2013, being named in their 2013 Vodacom Cup squad. He made just one appearance before he then moved across the Jukskei River to join the Golden Lions for 2014.

=== Varsity Cup ===
Willis represented the TUT Vikings in the 2008 and 2009 Varsity Cup competitions. Upon returning to the Blue Bulls, he was also included in the UP Tuks squad in 2013, scoring a try in the final against Maties.

=== Representative Rugby ===
Willis played for S.A. Schools teams in 2005 and 2006, South Africa Under-19 in 2007 and South Africa Under-20 in the inaugural IRB Junior World Championship in 2008. In 2013, he was also named in a South African Barbarians team to face Saracens.
