= 2009 Varsity Cup =

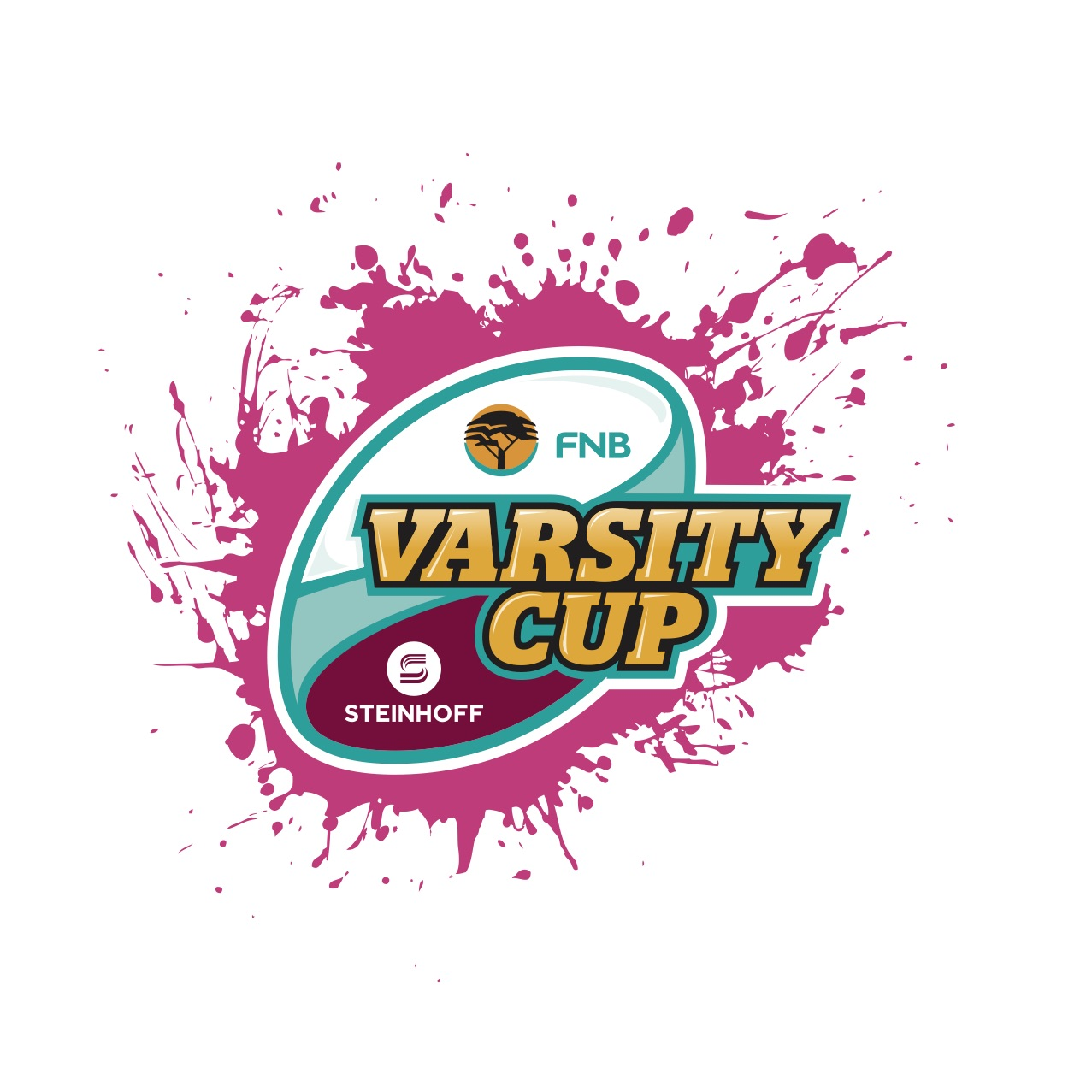
- Countries: South Africa
- Date: 1 February – 29 March 2009
- Champions: Maties (2nd title)
- Runners-up: NWU Pukke
- Matches played: 31
- Tries scored: 164 (average 5.3 per match)
- Top point scorer: Donald Stevens (105)
- Top try scorer: Therlow Pietersen (6)

The 2009 Varsity Cup was contested from 2 February to 30 March 2009. The tournament (also known as the FNB Varsity Cup presented by Steinhoff International for sponsorship reasons) was the second season of the Varsity Cup, an annual inter-university rugby union competition featuring eight South African universities.

The tournament was won by Maties for the second consecutive season; they beat NWU Pukke 11-6 in the final played on 30 March 2009.

== Competition rules ==
There were eight participating universities in the 2009 Varsity Cup. These teams played each other once over the course of the season, either home or away.

Teams received four points for a win and two points for a draw. Bonus points were awarded to teams that scored four or more tries in a game, as well as to teams that lost a match by seven points or less. Teams were ranked by log points, then points difference (points scored less points conceded).

The top four teams qualified for the Title Play-offs. In the semi-finals, the team that finished first had home advantage against the team that finished fourth, while the team that finished second had home advantage against the team that finished third. The winners of these semi-finals will play each other in the final, at the home venue of the higher-placed team.

== Teams ==
Location of teams in the 2009 Varsity Cup

The following teams took part in the 2009 Varsity Cup competition:

2009 Varsity Cup teams
| Team Name | University | Stadium |
| Maties | Stellenbosch University | Danie Craven Stadium, Stellenbosch |
| NMMU Madibaz | Nelson Mandela Metropolitan University | NMMU Stadium, Port Elizabeth |
| NWU Pukke | North-West University | Fanie du Toit Sport Ground, Potchefstroom |
| TUT Vikings | Tshwane University of Technology | TUT Stadium, Pretoria |
| UCT Ikey Tigers | University of Cape Town | UCT Rugby Fields, Cape Town |
| UFS Shimlas | University of the Free State | Shimla Park, Bloemfontein |
| UP Tuks | University of Pretoria | LC de Villiers Stadium, Pretoria |
| UJ | University of Johannesburg | UJ Stadium, Johannesburg |

== Table ==
2009 Varsity Cup Table
| Pos | Team | Pld | W | D | L | PF | PA | PD | TF | TA | TB | LB | Pts | Qualification |
|---|---|---|---|---|---|---|---|---|---|---|---|---|---|---|
| 1 | Maties | 7 | 6 | 0 | 1 | 203 | 84 | +119 | 22 | 8 | 3 | 1 | 28 | Title Play-Off Semi-finals |
| 2 | UCT Ikey Tigers | 7 | 5 | 0 | 2 | 177 | 121 | +56 | 21 | 13 | 3 | 2 | 25 | Title Play-Off Semi-finals |
| 3 | NWU Pukke | 7 | 5 | 0 | 2 | 197 | 124 | +73 | 23 | 13 | 2 | 1 | 23 | Title Play-Off Semi-finals |
| 4 | UP Tuks | 7 | 4 | 0 | 3 | 185 | 151 | +34 | 18 | 13 | 2 | 2 | 20 | Title Play-Off Semi-finals |
| 5 | UJ | 7 | 4 | 0 | 3 | 140 | 110 | +30 | 16 | 12 | 2 | 0 | 18 | |
| 6 | UFS Shimlas | 7 | 3 | 0 | 4 | 202 | 175 | +27 | 30 | 20 | 3 | 1 | 16 | |
| 7 | NMMU Madibaz | 7 | 1 | 0 | 6 | 102 | 265 | −163 | 11 | 34 | 0 | 0 | 4 | |
| 8 | TUT Vikings | 7 | 0 | 0 | 7 | 110 | 286 | −176 | 11 | 39 | 0 | 2 | 2 | |

Rules for classification:
- 4 points for a win
- 2 points for a draw
- 1 bonus point for a loss by seven points or less
- 1 bonus point for scoring four or more tries in a match

== Fixtures and results ==
- All times are South African (GMT+2)

=== Regular season ===
==== Week One ====
| 2009-02-02 | UFS Shimlas | 37 - 11 | NMMU Madibaz | Groote Schuur |
| 14:45 | Tries: Cameron Jacobs; Earl-Jivan Snyman; Josephus Oosthuizen; Lionel Cronjé (2); Cons: Johan Andries van Niekerk; Neill Jacobs (2); Pens: Neill Jacobs (2) | Scoreboard | Try: Vuyolwethu Oscar Mazaka; Pens: Willem Laubscher (2) | Attendance: 3,000; Referee: Gareth Lloyd-Jones |

| 2009-02-02 | UCT Ikey Tigers | 10 - 12 | Maties | Groote Schuur |
| 16:45 | Try: Stuart David Commins; Con: Matthew Ryan Rosslee; Pen: Matthew Ryan Rosslee | Scoreboard | Pens: Donald Stevens (4) | Attendance: 5,000; Referee: Francois Veldsman |

| 2009-02-02 | UJ | 16 - 9 | TUT Vikings | Fanie du Toit Sports Grounds |
| 16:45 | Try: Clinton de Klerk; Con: Earl Lewis; Pens: Arno Coetzee; Earl Lewis; DG: Arno Coetzee | Scoreboard | Pens: Adillio Le Roy Coutriers (3) | Attendance: 5,000; Referee: Mlungiseleli Mdashe |

| 2009-02-02 | NWU Pukke | 27 - 29 | UP Tuks | Fanie du Toit Sports Grounds |
| 18:45 | Tries: Wentsley Scott; Willem Ruurd (Beespan) Van der Wal; Con: Willem Diederik Botha; Pens: Willem Diederik Botha (5) | Scoreboard | Tries: Elwyn Fransman; Johan Jackson; Cons: Juan-Claude Roos (2); Pens: Juan-Claude Roos (4); DG: Juan-Claude Roos | Referee: Tiaan Jonker |

==== Week Two ====
| 2009-02-09 | TUT Vikings | 21 - 39 | UCT Ikey Tigers | TUT Stadium |
| 16:45 | Tries: Bakkies Steenkamp; Johannes Willem Swartz; Tjaart Kleu; Pens: Adillio Le Roy Coutriers (2) | Scoreboard | Tries: Liam Bax; Mark Jonathan Goosen; Marvin Christians; Therlow Pietersen (2); Cons: Matthew Ryan Rosslee (4); Pens: Matthew Ryan Rosslee (2) | Attendance: 2,000; Referee: Mtheleni Msileni |

| 2009-02-09 | NMMU Madibaz | 20 - 39 | UP Tuks | Xerox NMMU Stadium |
| 18:45 | Tries: André Goosen; Wade Roos; Cons: Willem Laubscher (2); Pens: Willem Laubscher (2) | Scoreboard | Tries: Aaron Denenga; Daniel Johannes Crous; Ettienne Breytenbach; Franco Booysen; Cons: Juan-Claude Roos (2); Pens: Juan-Claude Roos (3); Piet Swart (2) | Attendance: 1,200; Referee: Archie Sehlako |

| 2009-02-09 | UFS Shimlas | 15 - 27 | NWU Pukke | Shimla Park |
| 18:45 | Tries: Cameron Jacobs; Willie Britz; Wouter Stieger | Scoreboard | Tries: Jacques de Kock; Randall Jacques April; Theuns Kotzé; Cons: Theuns Kotzé (3); Pen: Theuns Kotzé; DG: Dewan Eckard | Attendance: 3,800; Referee: Ben Crouse |

| 2009-02-09 | Maties | 29 - 14 | UJ | Danie Craven Stadium |
| 19:30 | Tries: Jean Hermanus Stemmet; Matthew Grayson Dobson; Con: Donald Stevens (2); Pen: Donald Stevens (5) | Scoreboard | Tries: Edrick van Tonder; Pen: André Smith, Arno Coetzee (2) | Attendance: 10,000; Referee: Luke Burger |

==== Week Three ====
| 2009-02-16 | UCT Ikey Tigers | 32 - 12 | UJ | Groote Schuur |
| | | Scoreboard |

| 2009-02-16 | TUT Vikings | 9 - 45 | UP Tuks | TUT Stadium |
| | | Scoreboard |

| 2009-02-16 | UFS Shimlas | 5 - 26 | Maties | Shimla Park |
| | | Scoreboard |

| 2009-02-16 | NWU Pukke | 41 - 13 | NMMU Madibaz | Fanie du Toit Sports Grounds |
| | | Scoreboard |

==== Week Four ====
| 2009-02-23 | UJ | 44 - 8 | UFS Shimlas | UJ Stadium |
| | | Scoreboard |

| 2009-02-23 | UP Tuks | 22 - 24 | UCT Ikey Tigers | LC de Villiers Stadium |
| | | Scoreboard |

| 2009-02-23 | NMMU Madibaz | 28 - 18 | TUT Vikings | Xerox NMMU Stadium |
| | | Scoreboard |

| 2009-02-23 | Maties | 31 - 10 | NWU Pukke | Danie Craven Stadium |
| | | Scoreboard |

==== Week Five ====
| 2009-03-02 | UFS Shimlas | 39 - 22 | UP Tuks | Shimla Park |
| | | Scoreboard |

| 2009-03-02 | TUT Vikings | 17 - 24 | Maties | TUT Stadium |
| | | Scoreboard |

| 2009-03-02 | UJ | 9 - 19 | NWU Pukke | UJ Stadium |
| | | Scoreboard |

| 2009-03-02 | NMMU Madibaz | 17 - 36 | UCT Ikey Tigers | Xerox NMMU Stadium |
| | | Scoreboard |

==== Week Six ====
| 2009-03-09 | TUT Vikings | 14 - 56 | NWU Pukke | TUT Stadium |
| | | Scoreboard |

| 2009-03-09 | UCT Ikey Tigers | 23 - 20 | UFS Shimlas | Groote Schuur |
| | | Scoreboard |

| 2009-03-09 | Maties | 58 - 3 | NMMU Madibaz | Danie Craven Stadium |
| | | Scoreboard |

| 2009-03-09 | UJ | 9 - 3 | UP Tuks | UJ Stadium |
| | | Scoreboard |

==== Week Seven ====
| 2009-03-16 | NWU Pukke | 17 - 13 | UCT Ikey Tigers | Fanie du Toit Sports Grounds |
| | | Scoreboard |

| 2009-03-16 | NMMU Madibaz | 10 - 36 | UJ | Xerox NMMU Stadium |
| | | Scoreboard |

| 2009-03-16 | TUT Vikings | 22 - 78 | UFS Shimlas | TUT Stadium |
| | | Scoreboard |

| 2009-03-16 | Maties | 23 - 25 | UP Tuks | Danie Craven Stadium |
| | | Scoreboard |

=== Title Play-Off Games ===
Semi-finals
22 March 2010
UCT Ikey Tigers | 17
NWU Pukke | 19
22 March 2010
Maties | 38
UP Tuks | 14

Final
29 March 2010
Maties | 11
NWU Pukke | 06

==== Semi-finals ====
2009-03-23
16:45

| UCT Ikey Tigers | 17 - 19 | NWU Pukke |
| Tries: Dayne Martin Jans; Marcello Sampson; Michael John Richard Passaportis; Con: Matthew Ryan Rosslee | Scoreboard | Try: Lolo Yanga Waka; Con: Cecil Dumond; Pens: Cecil Dumond (4) |

Groote Schuur
Referee: Ben Crouse

2009-03-23
18:45

| Maties | 38 - 14 | UP Tuks |
| Tries: Dabeon Marshal Draghoender; Jean Hermanus Stemmet (2); Johann Sadie; Wesley Albert Wilkins; Wilhelm Hendrik Loock; Cons: Donald Stevens (4) | Scoreboard | Try: Christian van der Berg; Pens: Marnitz Louis Boshoff (2); DG: Clayton Blommetjies |

Danie Craven Stadium
Attendance: 10,000
Referee: Archie Sehlako

==== Final ====
2009-03-30

| Maties | 11 - 6 | NWU Pukke |
| Try: Morné Peter Jooste; Pen: Donald Stevens; DG: Johann Sadie | Scoreboard | Pens: Cecil Dumond (2) |

Danie Craven Stadium
Attendance: 20,000
Referee: Gareth Lloyd-Jones

| Maties | NWU Pukke |

| FB | 15 | Adnaan Oesman |
| RW | 14 | Morne Jooste |
| OC | 13 | Jean Stemmet |
| IC | 12 | Dabeom Draghoender |
| LW | 11 | Wilhelm Loock |
| FH | 10 | Johan Sadie |
| SH | 9 | Donald Stevens |
| N8 | 8 | Cameron Peverett |
| OF | 7 | Jonathan Adendorf |
| BF | 6 | Wesley Wilkins (c) |
| RL | 5 | Jaco Nepgen |
| LL | 4 | Hugo Kloppers |
| TP | 3 | Lourens Adriaanse |
| HK | 2 | Matthew Dobson |
| LP | 1 | Johan Roets |
Replacements:
| | 16 | JP Koster |
| | 17 | Andrew Crausaz |
| | 18 | Jean Rossouw |
| | 19 | Marinus Pretorius |
| | 20 | Morne Hanekom |
| | 21 | Johan Herbst |
| | 22 | Lwellyn Winkler |
| | 23 | TBC |
Coach:
Chean Roux

| FB | 15 | Willem Barnard |
| RW | 14 | Andrew van Wyk |
| OC | 13 | Wenstley Scott |
| IC | 12 | Wouter Watermeyer |
| LW | 11 | Lolo Waka |
| FH | 10 | Cecil Dumond |
| SH | 9 | Andries Mahoney |
| N8 | 8 | Willem van der Wal (c) |
| OF | 7 | Savvas Nel |
| BF | 6 | Jaco Lotter |
| RL | 5 | Markus Fourie |
| LL | 4 | Grant le Roux |
| TP | 3 | Stephan Bezuidenhout |
| HK | 2 | Stoffel Duvenage |
| LP | 1 | BG Uys |
Replacements:
| | 16 | Lourens Botes |
| | 17 | Dewald Coetzee |
| | 18 | Victor Kruger |
| | 19 | Thabo Molete |
| | 20 | Theuns Kotze |
| | 21 | Marcel du Toit |
| | 22 | Randall April |
| | 23 | Wesley Chetty |
Coach:
Rudy Joubert

Player of the Match:
Not documented Maties

Assistant referees:
François Veldsman & Dilbert November (South Africa), Neville Heilbron (South Africa)

Television match official:
Shaun Veldsman (South Africa)

== Honours ==
2009 Varsity Cup Honours
| Champions: | Maties (2nd Title) |
| Player That Rocks: | Donald Stevens, Maties |
| Forward That Rocks: | Willem van der Wal, NWU Pukke |
| Back That Rocks: | Therlow Pietersen, UCT Ikey Tigers |

== See also ==
- Varsity Cup
