= Maties (rugby union) =

South African rugby union club, Stellenbosch University

(South Africa) Maties
- Full name: Stellenbosch University Rugby
- Location: Stellenbosch, South Africa
- Region: Western Cape
- Ground: Danie Craven Stadium (Capacity: 16,000)
- Coach: Kambamba Floors
- Captain(s): Ezekiel Ngobeni (2025 - 2026)
- Most appearances: Niel Oelofse (44) (2013 - 2018)
- Top scorer: Donald Stevens (217) (2008 - 2012)
- Most tries: Edwill van der Merwe (23) (2016 - 2019)
- League: FNB Varsity Cup
- Championships: 5 (2008, 2009, 2010, 2018, 2019)
1st kit	2nd kit

First match
- Maties 31 - 31 UP Tuks (18 February 2008)

Largest win
- Maties 84 - 26 UWC (1 April 2019)

Largest defeat
- Maties 10 - 50 NWU Pukke (6 April 2026)

Official website
- www.matiesrugby.co.za
- Current season

Maties are the official rugby union team of Stellenbosch University in the Western Cape, South Africa. Competing in the FNB Varsity Cup, the country's premier university rugby competition, Maties are widely regarded as one of the most successful and historically significant university rugby programmes in South Africa.

Rugby has been central to the identity of Stellenbosch University since the late nineteenth century, and the Maties rugby club has produced numerous provincial and international players over the decades. Within the Varsity Cup era, Maties have established themselves as one of the competition's benchmark institutions.

== History ==
Since the inception of the FNB Varsity Cup in 2008, Maties have consistently ranked among the top-performing sides. They were crowned inaugural champions in 2008 after defeating the UCT Ikey Tigers 16–10 in the final.

=== Golden Era ===
The period from 2008 to 2010 is widely regarded as Maties' golden era in the Varsity Cup. During these three seasons, Maties won three consecutive titles (2008, 2009 and 2010), becoming the first team in the competition's history to achieve a championship hat-trick.

The 2010 campaign was particularly notable, as Maties completed an unbeaten season, winning all nine matches. Their 17–14 victory over the UCT Ikey Tigers in the final intensified the historic Intervarsity rivalry between the two institutions.

=== Modern Era ===
Maties added further championships in 2018 and 2019, with the 2019 campaign seeing the team complete another unbeaten season. As of the end of their 2026 campaign, Maties have played 164 Varsity Cup matches, winning 124, drawing 7 and losing 34, with an overall win percentage of 77%. They have scored 5,567 points and conceded 3,239 points across all seasons. Their sustained playoff appearances and high overall win rate have cemented Maties' reputation as one of the flagship teams of the Varsity Cup era.

=== Danie Craven ===
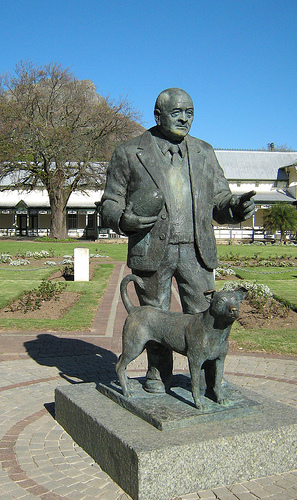
Statue of Danie Craven at Coetzenburg in Stellenbosch

Danie Craven Stadium is the home ground of Maties Rugby and is situated in the Coetzenburg sporting precinct on the campus of Stellenbosch University in Stellenbosch, Western Cape, South Africa. The stadium has a seating capacity of approximately 16,000 spectators and is widely regarded as one of the most historic university rugby venues in the country. Originally opened in 1921 as Coetzenburg Stadium, the venue was later renamed in honour of Dr Danie Craven, former Springbok captain and long-serving rugby administrator who played a significant role in the development of South African rugby. Over the decades, the stadium has become synonymous with the identity and traditions of Maties Rugby. The facility has undergone multiple upgrades to meet modern competition and broadcast standards, particularly following the introduction of the Varsity Cup in 2008. In addition to hosting Varsity Cup fixtures, the stadium has staged provincial matches, youth international fixtures, and other major rugby events, reinforcing its status as a premier rugby venue in the Western Cape.

=== UCT Rivalry ===
Maties' fiercest and most historic rivalry is with the Ikey Tigers. Both teams are among the most successful and supported sides in the Varsity Cup, and their clashes are rooted in longstanding geographical, cultural and sporting competition between the two Western Cape universities.

Matches between Maties and the Ikey Tigers regularly draw large crowds and are often televised on SuperSport, reflecting the intensity and popularity of the fixture within South African university rugby. Historically, the teams have met at key stages of the Varsity Cup, including finals and semifinals, contributing to a competitive head-to-head record.

A recent high-profile example occurred in the 2025 Varsity Cup final, where UCT Ikey Tigers defeated Maties 44–21 at Danie Craven Stadium, ending an 11-year title drought and denying Maties a home-ground victory in front of a packed crowd.

The rivalry extends beyond results; these fixtures are widely anticipated each season and are seen as marquee matchups that showcase the passion, skill and tradition of South African university rugby.

== Maties Records ==
=== Varsity Cup ===
*Stats correct as of 6 April 2026 (Semi Finals)

Maties – Varsity Cup record
Year	Pos	P	W	D	L	PF	PA	PD	TB	LB	Pts	W%	Result
2008	1	9	6	1	2	294	223	71	5	2	25	72%	Champions
2009	1	9	8	0	1	252	104	148	3	1	28	89%	Champions
2010	1	9	9	0	0	388	121	267	5	0	33	100%	Champions
2011	5	7	4	0	3	209	138	71	4	1	21	57%	5th
2012	2	9	7	1	1	250	113	137	3	0	29	83%	2nd
2013	2	9	8	0	1	226	176	50	5	0	33	89%	2nd
2014	3	8	4	1	3	182	179	3	3	0	21	56%	3rd/4th
2015	5	7	3	2	2	177	171	6	4	1	21	57%	5th
2016	2	9	7	0	2	318	140	178	5	0	29	78%	2nd
2017	2	10	8	0	2	389	185	204	5	1	34	80%	2nd
2018	1	9	8	1	0	373	138	235	6	0	34	94%	Champions
2019	1	10	10	0	0	466	146	320	6	0	38	100%	Champions
2020	1	5	5	0	0	232	59	173	2	0	22	100%	N/A COVID-19
2021	3	10	7	0	3	366	215	151	4	2	34	70%	3rd/4th
2022	2	11	8	0	3	405	282	123	6	0	34	73%	2nd
2023	4	8	4	0	4	237	271	-34	2	1	19	50%	3rd/4th
2024	2	8	6	0	2	255	168	87	2	0	26	75%	2nd
2025	2	9	7	0	2	309	159	150	3	0	27	78%	2nd
2026	3	8	5	0	3	262	228	34	6	0	26	63%	3rd/4th
Total		164	124	6	34	5,567	3,239	2,328	Overall Win %: 77%				

Champions
Runners-up
Losing semi-finalist

=== Head to Head ===
The following table summarises Maties Rugby's head-to-head record in the Varsity Cup. As the most successful side in the competition's history, Maties have established sustained dominance across multiple eras, combining one of the highest overall win percentages with the strongest cumulative points differential in the tournament.

Across 164 matches against 12 opponents, Maties have recorded 124 wins, 6 draws and 34 defeats – an overall win rate of 77%. Maties continue to maintain unbeaten records against TUT Vikings, Wits and UWC.

Stats correct as of 6 April 2026 (Semi Finals)

Opposition	P	W	D	L	PF	PA	PD	% W	Avg Margin
UP Tuks	27	16	1	10	727	676	+51	61%	+1.9
UCT Ikey Tigers	23	17	1	5	708	421	+287	76%	+12.5
UFS Shimlas	22	15	1	6	777	469	+308	71%	+14.0
UJ	20	16	1	3	532	368	+264	83%	+13.2
NWU Pukke	24	17	2	5	665	454	+211	75%	+8.8
NMU Madibaz	14	13	0	1	527	250	277	93%	+19.8
Wits	11	11	0	0	402	209	+193	100%	+17.5
CUT Ixias	9	8	0	1	442	141	+301	89%	+33.4
UWC	5	5	0	0	307	97	+210	100%	+42.0
TUT Vikings	5	5	0	0	225	41	+184	100%	+36.8
CUT	3	2	0	1	123	70	+53	67%	+19.0
Emeris	1	1	0	0	55	20	+35	100%	+35.0
Total	164	124	6	34	5,567	3,239	+2,328	77%	+14.2

=== Pool vs Playoffs ===
Stats correct as of 6 April 2026 (Semi Finals

Phase	GP	W	D	L	PF	PA	PD	% W	Avg Margin
Regular Season	137	108	6	23	4,845	2,699	+2,146	81%	+15.7
Semi-finals	16	10	–	6	505	329	+166	63%	+10.4
Finals	11	6	–	5	217	201	+16	55%	+1.5
Total	164	124	6	34	5,567	3,239	+2,328	77%	+14.2

== Statistics ==
=== Team records ===
Most tries in a match
12 - Maties 84–26 UWC (2019)

Accolades
• First team to 100 wins in Varsity Cup history.
• Fewest losses in Varsity Cup history.
• First team in Varsity Cup history to exceed 4,500 points scored in the competition.
• Most points scored in a Varsity Cup semi-final - 65 points against Wits in 2018.
• Highest winning margin in a Varsity Cup semi-final - 47 against Wits in 2018.

=== Individual records ===
Most tries in a match
4 - Andre-Hugo Venter, Maties vs FNB UWC (2021)

Most tries in a season
12 – Sean Swart (2022)
10 – Duncan Saal (2018)
9 – Dewet Marais (2024)
9 – Craig Barry (2017)

Most tries in a career
23 – Edwill van der Merwe (2016–2019)
20 – Duncan Saal (2016–2019)
18 – Therlow Pietersen (Maties 2008, UCT 2009–2011)
16 – Craig Barry (2014–2018)
14 – Tythan Adams (Maties 2010–2011, Madibaz 2014–2015)

Most points in a season
125 – Jordan Chait (2019)
117 – Nevaldo Fleurs (2023)
105 - Donald Stevens (2008)
84 – Robert du Preez (2014)

Most points in a career
217 – Donald Stevens (2008–2012)
166 – Chris Smith (2014–2018)

Most appearances in a career
44 – Niel Oelofse (2013–2018)
41 – Craig Barry (2014–2018)
37 – Edwill van der Merwe (2016–2019)
35 – Wesley Adonis (Maties 2015–2017, UP Tuks 2018)
35 – Neethling Fouché (UP Tuks 2014–2017, Maties 2018)
35 – Andre Smith (UJ 2008–2011, Maties 2012)

== Varsity Cup Honours ==
The Honour Roll for Maties' Varsity Cup is as follows:

2025 Varsity Cup Honours
Forward player of the year:	Carel van der Merwe

2024 Varsity Cup Honours
Top try scorer:	Dewet Marais (9)

2023 Varsity Cup Honours
Rookie of the year:	Grant De Jager

2022 Varsity Cup Honours
Backline player of the year:	Nevaldo Fleurs
Top try scorer:	Sean Swart (12)

2021 Varsity Cup Honours
Backline player of the year:	Munier Hartzenberg

2018 Varsity Cup Honours
Top try scorer:	Duncan Saal (10)

2017 Varsity Cup Honours
Top try scorer:	Craig Barry (9)

2016 Varsity Cup Honours
Forward player of the year:	Beyers de Villiers
Backline player of the year:	Craig Barry

2014 Varsity Cup Honours
Player of the year:	Robert du Preez
Top points scorer:	Robert du Preez (84)

2013 Varsity Cup Honours
Forward player of the year:	Reniel Hugo

2011 Varsity Cup Honours
Player of the year:	Callie Visagie
Forward player of the year:	Hugo Kloppers

2010 Varsity Cup Honours
Forward player of the year:	Lourens Adriaanse

2009 Varsity Cup Honours
Player of the year:	Donald Stevens
Top points scorer:	Donald Stevens (105)

2008 Varsity Cup Honours
Player of the year:	Sarel Potgieter

== Team Awards ==
2025 Maties Awards
Forward of the Year:	Fortune Mpofu
Back of the year:	MC Van Heerden Smith
Varsity Cup MVP:	Ezekiel Ngobeni
Players' Player of the Year:	Ezekiel Ngobeni
Player of the Year:	Grant De Jager

== Springboks ==
A number of players who represented FNB Maties in the FNB Varsity Cup and related competitions have gone on to represent the Springboks. The Varsity Cup pathway has produced numerous Test players, including Rugby World Cup winners. Below are Maties alumni who made their Springbok Test debut after playing in the Varsity Cup system.

Springbok Test debutants

2010 (under Peter de Villiers)
Juan de Jongh (2008 FNB Varsity Cup champion)

2012 (under Heyneke Meyer)
JJ Engelbrecht

2013 (under Heyneke Meyer)
Lourens Adriaanse (2009 and 2010 FNB Varsity Cup champion)

2016 (under Allister Coetzee)
Ruan Combrinck

2017 (under Allister Coetzee)
Louis Schreuder

2018 (under Rassie Erasmus)
Robert du Preez

2019 (under Rassie Erasmus)
Rynhardt Elstadt

2024 (under Rassie Erasmus)
Andre-Hugo Venter
Jordan Hendrikse (Young Guns)
Edwill van der Merwe
Ben-Jason Dixon

== Results ==
=== Current Season ===
Round 1

16 February 2026
16:45

UFS Shimlas	50–39	Maties
Try: du Preez 15'; Botha 18'; Jacobus 24, 41'; Kleynhans 56'; Shamburg 63'; Con: Pierre Giddy 16' (4); Pen: Pierre Giddy (76 p), (78 p); Cards: Shamburg (yellow card) 83'	Report	Try: Mpofu 27'; Rynhardt 35'; Marx 37'; Christiaan 40'; Combrinck 44'; Erasmus 82'; Poswa 84'; Con: Christiaan

UWC Sport Stadium, Cape Town
Referee: Jonathan Lottering

Round 2

23 February 2026
19:00

Maties	39–19	UJ
Try: Rynhardt 18'; Marx 45'; Erasmus 62'; Volmoer 65'; Manuel 72'; Ngobeni 76'; Con: Christiaan 46'; Christiaan 63'; Christiaan 77'; Pen: Christiaan (31 p); Cards: Strydom (yellow card) 60'	Report	Try: Molefa 20'; Mphafi 32'; Con: Gabrielsen 21'; Gabrielsen 33'; Pen: Gabrielsen (54 p); Cards: Swarts (yellow card) 75'

Danie Craven Stadium, Stellenbosch
Referee: Lulutho Matomela

Round 3

2 March 2026
19:00

UP Tuks	33-17	Maties
Try: Fourie (2); Austin; Van Vuuren; Dukuswa; Con: Du Toit (3); Cards: Myeni (yellow card)	Report	Try: Manuel; Erasmus; Con: Christiaan (2); Pen: Christiaan (p) (1); Cards: Burton (yellow card); Hahn (yellow card)

LC de Villiers Stadium, Pretoria
Referee: Eon van Zyl

Round 4

9 March 2026
19:00

Maties	55-20	Emeris
Try: Van Zitters 19'; Badenhorst 29', 50'; Hahn 33'; Poswa 34'; Ngobeni 40'; Erasmus 42'; Liversage 66', 74'; Con: Van Heerden Smith 19', 29', 42', 51'		Try: Okonta 48'; Sigauke 52', 79'; Pen: Marx (5 p); Cards: Luthuli (yellow card) 39'

Danie Craven Stadium, Stellenbosch
Attendance: 16,000+
Referee: Zoe Naude

Round 5

16 March 2026
16:45

UCT Ikey Tigers	07-34	Maties
Try: Benade 47'; Cards: (yellow card)	Report	Try: Botha 6'; Basson 43', 45'; Ngobeni 41'; Poswa 42'; Volmoer 80'

UCT Rugby Fields, Cape Town
Referee: Juan de Bod
FNB Player of the Match - Ezekiel Ngobeni (Maties)

Round 6

23 March 2026
19:00

Maties	30–26	NWU Eagles
Try: Michaels; Marx; Poswa; Du Toit; Fourie; Con: Van Heerden Smith; Pen: Van Heerden Smith (p)	Report	Try: Janeke; Petersen; Venter; Con: Van Willing (2); Pen: Van Willing (p)

Danie Craven Stadium, Stellenbosch
Attendance: 15,000+

Referee: Hernus Coetzee
FNB Player of the Match - Ruan van Willing (NWU Eagles)

Round 7

30 March 2026
19:00

CUT Ixias	22-38	Maties
Try: Malothane; Seyaga; Vergotine; Con: Malan; Pen: Malan (p) (2); Cards: (yellow card) (2)	Report	Try: Erasmus (3); Van Heerden Smith; Fourie; Burton; Con: Van Heerden Smith (2); Ngobeni; Cards: (yellow card) (2)

CUT Stadium, Bloemfontein
FNB Player of the Match - Tsebano Stemer (CUT Ixias)
Referee: Eon van Zyl

Semi Finals

6 April 2026
16:45

NWU Eagles	50-10	Maties
Try: Roulston 24'; Mcloughlin 43'; Krugel 48'; Janeke 58', 76'; Dampies 63'; Otto 72'; Con: Mostert 25', 44', 59', 64', 73', 77'; Pen: Mostert (15 p)	Report	Try: Basson 8'; Con: van Heerden Smith 8'; Pen: van Heerden Smith (25 p); Cards: Ngobeni (yellow card) 37'

Fanie du Toit Sport Ground, Potchefstroom
Attendance: 5,000+
Referee: Hernus Coetzee
FNB Player of the Match - Ricardo Fourie NWU Eagles

=== Past Results ===
2008 Results

Round 1

18 February 2008
18:45

Maties	31–31	UP Tuks
Try: Pieter Stoffberg 26' m Lucian Cloete (2) 34' m, 49' m Cameron Peverett 53' c Con: Henoe Stoffberg (1/4) 54'; Pen: Henoe Stoffberg (3/4) 17', 30', 40'; Cards: Sarel Potgieter (yellow card) 37' to 47'	Report; Scoreboard	Try: Henk de Ridder 45' m Eben Joubert 64' m Torsten van Jaarsveld 73' c Gerhard van den Heever 76' c Shaun Davids 79' c Con: Chandré Boshoff (3/3) 74', 77', 80'

Danie Craven Stadium, Stellenbosch
Attendance: 17,000
Referee: Jaco Peyper

Round 2

23 February 2008
18:00

NMMU Madibaz	24–40	Maties
Try: Craig Ross 26' c William Fick 61' c Morné van der Westhuyzen 80' c Con: Kit Branch (3/3) 27', 62', 80+1'; Pen: Kit Branch (1/1) 37'; Cards: Kenneth Snodgrass (yellow card) 5' to 15'; Wesley Kew (yellow card) 59' to 69'; Kit Branch (yellow card) 65' to 75'	Scoreboard	Try: Jaco Nepgen 9' c Justin Melck 41' c Bennie Booysen 67' c Jowayne van Wyk 75' c Con: Donald Stevens (4/4) 10', 42', 68', 76'; Pen: Donald Stevens (4/5) 2', 6', 18', 79'; Cards: Lisle Clark (yellow card) 77'

NMMU Stadium, Port Elizabeth
Referee: Stuart Berry

Round 3

3 March 2008
18:45

NWU Pukke	31–24	Maties
Try: Nelis Nel 9' c Lolo Waka 37' m Stoffel Duvenage 53' c Con: Corné Meyer (2/3) 10', 54'; Pen: Corné Meyer (4/5) 22', 45', 63', 68'; Cards: BG Uys (yellow card) 70'	Report; Scoreboard	Try: Wesley Wilkins (3) 16' c, 65' c, 78' c Con: Donald Stevens (1/1) 17'; Sarel Potgieter (2/2) 66', 79'; Pen: Sarel Potgieter (1/1) 60'

Fanie du Toit Sport Ground, Potchefstroom
Attendance: 15,000
Referee: Francois Veldsman

Round 4

8 March 2008
18:15

Maties	27–11	UFS Shimlas
Try: Sarel Potgieter 32' c, 46' c Therlow Pietersen 53' c Con: Sarel Potgieter (3/3) 33', 47', 54'; Pen: Sarel Potgieter (2/2) 22', 30'	Scoreboard	Try: Cameron Jacobs 80' m Pen: Jan du Toit (2/2) 9', 36'; Cards: Marlin Ruiters (yellow card) 4' to 14'

Danie Craven Stadium, Stellenbosch
Attendance: 3,000
Referee: Chris Healy

Round 5

20 March 2008
15:00

UCT Ikey Tigers	38–34	Maties
Try: Danie van der Merwe 19' c Craig Kleu 34' c Herbie Mayosi 47' c Dane Galley 63' c Marcello Sampson 74' c Con: Matthew Rosslee (5/5) 20', 35', 48', 64', 75'; Pen: Matthew Rosslee (1/2) 43'; Cards: JJ Gagiano (yellow card) 78'	Scoreboard	Try: Coenie van Wyk 15' c Therlow Pietersen 39' c Jaco Nepgen 57' c Andrew Crausaz 79' c Con: Sarel Potgieter (4/4) 16', 40', 58', 79'; Pen: Sarel Potgieter (2/2) 1', 6'; Cards: De Kock Steenkamp (yellow card) 29'

Outeniqua Park, George
Attendance: 5,000
Referee: Tiaan Jonker

Round 6

22 March 2008
17:00

Maties	32–24	UJ
Try: Llewellyn Winckler (2) 19' m, 57' m Morné Jooste 21' m Therlow Pietersen 42' m Sarel Potgieter 44' m Jean Stemmet 52' c Con: Coenie van Wyk (1/4) 53'	Scoreboard	Try: Hennie Oosthuizen 15' c Jaco Snyman 63' m Con: Ryno Luus (1/2) 16'; Pen: Ryno Luus (4/4) 10', 25', 28', 54'; Cards: Derick Minnie (yellow card) 70' to 80'

Outeniqua Park, George
Attendance: 5,000
Referee: Mtheleni Msileni

Round 7

24 March 2008
12:30

TUT Vikings	10–43	Maties
Try: Vainon Willis 71' c Con: James Watt (1/1) 72'; Pen: Braam Pretorius (1/2) 50'; Cards: Aubrey McDonald (yellow card) 34' to 44'; Danie Crous (yellow card) 47' to 57'	Scoreboard	Try: Coenie van Wyk 18' c Llewellyn Winckler 27' m Zandré Jordaan 35' m Matthew Dobson 51' m Wilhelm Koch 60' c Andy Russel 63' c Jean Stemmet 79' c Con: Sarel Potgieter (1/3) 19'; Therlow Pietersen (3/4) 61', 64', 80'; Cards: Matthew Dobson (yellow card) 56' to 66'; Andrew Crausaz (yellow card) 72'

Outeniqua Park, George
Attendance: 2,000
Referee: Mtheleni Msileni

Semi-final

31 March 2008
18:45

UP Tuks	44–47	Maties
Try: Gert Lubbe 21' c Johan van Heerden (2) 44' c, 57' c Gerhard van den Heever (2) 52' m, 67' m Oscar Mfundisi 78' c Con: Chandré Boshoff (3/5) 22', 45', 58'; Joey Mongalo (1/1) 79'; Pen: Chandré Boshoff (2/2) 19', 30'	Scoreboard	Try: Jean Stemmet 8' c Jonathan Adendorf 28' c Sarel Potgieter 36' c Wilhelm Koch 41' c Henoe Stoffberg 72' c Con: Henoe Stoffberg (5/5) 9', 29', 37', 42', 73'; Pen: Henoe Stoffberg (4/5) 49', 61', 70', 99'

Danie Craven Stadium, Stellenbosch
Referee: Joey Salmans

Final

7 April 2008
18:45

UCT Ikey Tigers	10–16	Maties
Try: Marcello Sampson 22' m Mathew Turner 62' m Cards: Herbie Mayosi (yellow card) 8' to 19'	Scoreboard	Try: Morné Jooste 80+2' c Con: Ricardo Croy (1/1) 80+3'; Pen: Henoe Stoffberg (2/2) 9', 33'; Drop: Ricardo Croy (1/1) 71'; Cards: Sarel Potgieter (yellow card) 21' to 29'

Danie Craven Stadium, Stellenbosch
Attendance: 20,000
Referee: Lourens van der Merwe

2009 Results
Round 1

2009-02-02
16:45

UCT Ikey Tigers	10 - 12	Maties
Try: Stuart David Commins; Con: Matthew Ryan Rosslee; Pen: Matthew Ryan Rosslee	Scoreboard	Pens: Donald Stevens (4)

Groote Schuur
Attendance: 5,000
Referee: Francois Veldsman

Round 2

2009-02-09
19:30

Maties	29 - 14	UJ
Tries: Jean Hermanus Stemmet; Matthew Grayson Dobson; Con: Donald Stevens (2); Pen: Donald Stevens (5)	Scoreboard	Tries: Edrick van Tonder; Pen: André Smith, Arno Coetzee (2)

Danie Craven Stadium
Attendance: 10,000
Referee: Luke Burger

Round 3

2009-02-16

UFS Shimlas	5 - 26	Maties
	Scoreboard

Shimla Park

Round 4

2009-02-23

Maties	31 - 10	NWU Pukke
	Scoreboard

Danie Craven Stadium

Round 5

2009-03-02

TUT Vikings	17 - 24	Maties
	Scoreboard

TUT Stadium

Round 6

2009-03-09

Maties	58 - 3	NMMU Madibaz
	Scoreboard

Danie Craven Stadium

Round 7

2009-03-16

Maties	23 - 25	UP Tuks
	Scoreboard

Danie Craven Stadium

Semi-finals

2009-03-23	Maties	38 - 14	UP Tuks	Danie Craven Stadium
18:45	Tries: Dabeon Marshal Draghoender; Jean Hermanus Stemmet (2); Johann Sadie; Wesley Albert Wilkins; Wilhelm Hendrik Loock; Cons: Donald Stevens (4)	Scoreboard	Try: Christian van der Berg; Pens: Marnitz Louis Boshoff (2); DG: Clayton Blommetjies	Attendance: 10,000; Referee: Archie Sehlako

Final

2009-03-30

Maties	11 - 6	NWU Pukke
Try: Morné Peter Jooste; Pen: Donald Stevens; DG: Johann Sadie	Scoreboard	Pens: Cecil Dumond (2)

Danie Craven Stadium
Attendance: 20,000
Referee: Gareth Lloyd-Jones

2010 Results
Round 1

2010-02-01

NMMU Madibaz	20 - 68	Maties
	Scoreboard

Xerox NMMU Stadium

Round 2

2010-02-08

Maties	62 - 0	TUT Vikings
	Scoreboard

Danie Craven Stadium

Round 3

2010-02-15

UJ	10 - 43	Maties
	Scoreboard

UJ Stadium

Round 4

2010-02-22

Maties	31 - 15	UFS Shimlas
	Scoreboard

Danie Craven Stadium

Round 5

2010-03-01

Maties	64 - 17	UP Tuks
	Scoreboard

Danie Craven Stadium

Round 6

2010-03-08

Maties	23 - 17	UCT Ikey Tigers
	Scoreboard

Danie Craven Stadium

Round 7

2010-03-15

NWU Pukke	17 - 33	Maties
	Scoreboard

Fanie du Toit Sports Grounds

Semi-finals

2010-03-22

Maties	47 - 11	NWU Pukke
	Scoreboard

Danie Craven Stadium

Final

2010-03-29

Maties	17 - 14	UCT Ikey Tigers
	Scoreboard

Danie Craven Stadium

2011 Results
Round 1

2011-02-07
19:00

Maties	32 – 6	NWU Pukke
Tries: Helmut Lehman 42'c Hugo Kloppers 53'c Os Hamman 66'c Tshotsho Mbovane 77'm Con: Donald Stevens (2/2); André Kemp (1/2); Pen: Donald Stevens 13', 23' (2/2)	Report	DG: Niëll Jacobs 17', 24' (2/2)

Craven Stadium
Attendance: 15,000
Referee: Rasta Rashivenga

Round 2

2011-02-14
19:00

UFS Shimlas	21 – 15	Maties
Tries: Charl Weideman 10'c Jamba Ulengo 64'm Con: Franna du Toit (1/1); Pens: Franna du Toit 24' (1/1); Shaun Davids 54', 76' (2/2)	Report	Pens: Donald Stevens 39', 45', 51', 63' (4/4); DG: André Kemp 26' (1/1)

Xerox Shimla Park
Attendance: 9,000
Referee: Dilbert November

Round 3

2011-02-21
17:00

TUT Vikings	12 – 44	Maties
Tries: JJ Breet 39'c Hansie Graaff 65'm Con: Ruan Boshoff (1/2); Card: Thom Seabala (yellow card) 52' to 64'	Report	Tries: Ryan Nell 29'm Tertius Daniller 34'c Donald Stevens 50'c Penalty try 52'c Tythan Adams 62'c, 71'm Cons: Donald Stevens (3/4); André Kemp (1/2); Pens: Donald Stevens 21', 44' (2/3)

TUT Stadium
Referee: Archie Sehlako

Round 4

2011-02-28
19:00

Maties	49 – 17	NMMU Madibaz
Tries: Callie Visagie 2'm, 81'c Donald Stevens 6'c Ruan Combrinck 37'm Ryan Nell 46'c, 54'm Stokkies Hanekom 78'c Con: Donald Stevens (1/2); Ruan Combrinck (1/3); Jarryd Buys (2/2); Pens: Donald Stevens 21', 28' (2/2)	Report	Tries: Ferdinand Gerber 30'c Vuyolwethu Mazaka 76'c Con: Bradley Kretzmann (1/1); Marius Muller (1/1); Pen: Bradley Kretzmann 23' (1/3); Card: Ferdinand Gerber (yellow card) 52' to 62'

Craven Stadium
Referee: Dilbert November

Round 5

2011-03-07
17:00

UCT Ikey Tigers	16 – 37	Maties
Try: Ricky Rijs 62'c Con: Demetri Catrakilis (1/1); Pens: Demetri Catrakilis 10', 11' (2/3); DG: Demetri Catrakilis 2' (1/1)	Report	Tries: Tythan Adams 4'c, 16'c Helmut Lehman 29'c Stokkies Hanekom 79'c Cons: Donald Stevens (2/2); André Kemp (2/2); Pens: Donald Stevens 6', 48', 68' (3/4)

UCT Rugby Fields
Attendance: 5,036
Referee: Tiaan Jonker

Round 6

2011-03-14
19:00

UP Tuks	27 – 13	Maties
Tries: Deon Helberg 20'm Franco Mostert 65'c Con: JC Roos (1/1); Pens: Wesley Dunlop 7', 15', 29', 34', 41' (5/5); Cards: Nzubeko Zulu (yellow card) 24' to 36'; Jacques Verwey (yellow card) 25' to 36'	Report	Try: Penalty try 25'c Con: André Kemp (1/1); Pens: Donald Stevens 2', 55' (2/2)

Tuks Rugby Stadium
Attendance: 5,000
Referee: Mlungiseli Mdashe

Round 7

2011-03-21
19:00

Maties	19 – 39	UJ
Tries: Stokkies Hanekom 39'c Hugo Kloppers 43'm Louis Jordaan 75'c Cons: Donald Stevens (2/3)	Report	Tries: Lolo Waka 4'm, 46'c Rudi Paige 24'm Luan Steenkamp 29'm Aubrey McDonald 73'c Alfred Ries 80'c Con: André Smith (3/3); DG: André Smith 55' (1/1)

Craven Stadium
Attendance: 5,000
Referee: Archie Sehlako

2012 Results

Round 1

2012-02-06
19:00

Maties	52 – 2	TUT Vikings
Try: Wessel Coetzee; Grant Hattingh (3); Os Hamman (2); André Smith; Con: André Kemp (4); Donald Stevens; Pen: André Kemp	Report	Pen: Hansie Graaff

Craven Stadium
Referee: Ben Crouse

Round 2

2012-02-13
19:00

NWU Pukke	12 – 14	Maties
Try: Andrew van Wyk; Con: Gerhard Nortier; Pen: Gerhard Nortier (2)	Report	Try: Ryan Nell; Gareth Light; Pen: André Kemp (2)

Fanie du Toit Stadium
Referee: Tiaan Jonker

Round 3

2012-02-20	Maties	20 – 7	UFS Shimlas	Craven Stadium
19:00	Try: André Smith; Gareth Light; Brummer Badenhorst; Con: André Kemp; Pen: André Kemp	Report	Try: Jamba Ulengo; Pen: Nico Scheepers

Round 4

2012-02-27
19:00

Maties	23 – 22	UP Tuks
Try: Ryan Nell; Grant Hattingh; Hein van der Merwe; Con: Donald Stevens; André Kemp; Pen: Donald Stevens	Report	Try: Grant Kemp; Clayton Blommetjies; Con: Wesley Dunlop (2); Pen: Wesley Dunlop (3)

Craven Stadium
Referee: Jason Jaftha

Round 5

2012-03-05
19:00

NMMU Madibaz	26 – 42	Maties
Try: Jaco Otto; Carl van Niekerk (2); Tim Agaba; Con: Martin du Toit (2)	Report	Try: Rob Herring (3); Os Hamman; Wessel Coetzee (2); Con: André Kemp (3); André Smith

Xerox NMMU Stadium

Round 6

2012-03-12
19:00

Maties	45 – 5	UCT Ikey Tigers
Try: Grant Hattingh (2); André Smith (2); Helmut Lehmann; Wessel Coetzee; Con: André Kemp (3); André Smith (2)	Report	Try: Rayn Smid

Craven Stadium
Referee: Ben Crouse

Round 7

2012-03-19
19:00

UJ	10 – 10	Maties

UJ Stadium

Semi-final

2012-03-26
19:00

Maties	23 – 0	UJ

Craven Stadium

Final

2012-04-09
19:00

UP Tuks	29 – 21	Maties
Try: Trompie Pretorius 4'; Basil Short 33'; Lohan Jacobs 41'; Franco Mostert 64'; Con: Wesley Dunlop 34', 42', 65' (3/4)		Try: André Smith 20'; Hugo Kloppers 36'; Hein van der Merwe 82'; Con: Donald Stevens 21' (1/2); André Kemp 83' (1/1)

L.C. de Villiers Rugby Stadium

2013 Results

Round 1

4 February 2013
17:00

Maties	29 – 8	UJ
Try: Clearance Khumalo 55'; Reniel Hugo 61'; JP Lewis 67', 72'; Con: JH Potgieter 56', 62' (2/2); Dean Grant 73' (1/2)	Report; Scoreboard	Try: AJ le Roux 35'; Con: Kobus de Kock 36' (1/1)

Danie Craven Stadium, Stellenbosch
Attendance: 19,800
Referee: Matt Kemp

Round 2

11 February 2013
19:00

UFS Shimlas	15 – 23	Maties
Try: Maphutha Dolo 12'; Erik le Roux 43'; Con: Franna du Toit 44' (1/2); Pen: Pieter-Steyn de Wet 62' (1/2); Drop: Maphutha Dolo (0/1); Robbie van Schalkwyk (0/1)	Report; Scoreboard	Try: Reniel Hugo 5'; Helmut Lehmann 26'; Jacobus Jordaan 39'; JP Lewis 74'; Con: Dean Grant 27' (1/4)

Shimla Park, Bloemfontein
Attendance: 8,500
Referee: Jaco Kotze

Round 3

18 February 2013
19:00

Maties	13 – 8	NMMU Madibaz
Try: Neethling Gericke 11'; Reniel Hugo 70'; Con: Dean Grant 12' (1/1); JH Potgieter (0/1); Cards: Reniel Hugo (yellow card) 77'	Report; Scoreboard	Try: Ulrich Pretorius 35'; Con: Justin van Staden 36' (1/1)

Danie Craven Stadium, Stellenbosch
Attendance: 13,500
Referee: Quinton Immelman

Round 4

25 February 2013
19:00

UP Tuks	16 – 18	Maties
Try: Juan Schoeman 6' penalty try 25'; Con: Tian Schoeman 7', 25' (2/2)	Report; Scoreboard	Try: James Alexander 22'; Mark Hodgskiss 38'; Con: JH Potgieter 23', 38' (2/2); Pen: Dean Grant 79' (1/1); Cards: Dean Hammond (yellow card) 25' to 35'

LC de Villiers Stadium, Pretoria
Attendance: 14,800
Referee: Ben Crouse

Round 5

4 March 2013
16:45

UCT Ikey Tigers	15 – 37	Maties
Try: Brad Bosman 32'; Tiger Bax 45'; Con: Ross Jones-Davies 33' (1/2); Pen: Ross Jones-Davies 23' (1/1); Cards: Liam Slatem (yellow card) 15' to 25'	Scoreboard	Try: Neethling Gericke 6', 27'; Ryan Nell 50'; Beyers de Villiers 72'; JP Lewis 75'; Con: Dean Grant 28', 51', 73', 76' (4/5)

UCT Rugby Fields, Cape Town
Referee: Marius van der Westhuizen

Round 6

11 March 2013
19:00

Wits	21 – 48	Maties
Try: Riaan Arends 9'; Matt Torrance 48'; Rinus Bothma 77'; Con: Kyle Peyper 10', 78' (2/3)	Scoreboard	Try: Helmut Lehmann 2', 30', 44'; Andries Truter 24'; Mark Hodgskiss 60'; Brianton Boysen 75'; Con: Dean Grant 3', 24', 31', 45' (4/4); JH Potgieter 60', 76' (2/2)

Wits Rugby Stadium, Johannesburg
Attendance: 3,000
Referee: Pro Legoete

Round 7

18 March 2013
19:00

Maties	37 – 34	NWU Pukke
Try: Clearance Khumalo 5'; Os Hamman 26'; Charl de Villiers 34'; Craig Barry 44'; Ryan Nell 57'; Con: JH Potgieter 6', 27', 35', 58' (4/5)	Scoreboard	Try: HP Swart 53'; Sylvian Mahuza 64'; Hoffmann Maritz 72'; Luther Obi 77', 80'; Con: Tiaan Dorfling 65', 73' (2/4); SW Oosthuizen 81' (1/1)

Danie Craven Stadium, Stellenbosch
Referee: François Groenewald

Semi-final

25 March 2013
19:00

Maties	16 – 15	NMMU Madibaz
Try: penalty try 36'; James Alexander 64'; Con: JH Potgieter 37', 65' (2/2)	Scoreboard	Try: Brian Shabangu 61'; Jarryd Buys 72'; Martin Ferreira 77'; Con: Justin van Staden (0/1); Gerrit Smith (0/2); Pen: Logan Basson (0/1); Cards: Dwayne Kelly (yellow card) 35' to 44'; Stefan Willemse (yellow card) 36' to 45'

Danie Craven Stadium, Stellenbosch
Referee: Ben Crouse

Final

8 April 2013
19:00

Maties	5 – 44	UP Tuks
Try: Clearance Khumalo 57'; Con: JH Potgieter (0/1)	Scoreboard"	Try: Danie Faasen 15'; Willie du Plessis 20'; Jono Ross 36'; Courtnall Skosan 47'; Vainon Willis 77'; Con: Handré Pollard 16', 21', 37', 48', 78' (5/5); Pen: Handré Pollard 60' (1/1); Drop: Clayton Blommetjies 72' (1/1)

Danie Craven Stadium, Stellenbosch
Attendance: 20,000
Referee: Marius van der Westhuizen

2014 Results

Round 1

3 February 2014
16:45

NMMU Madibaz	45–29	Maties
Try: Chris Cloete 4', 11', 49', 58', 63'; Tim Agaba 32'; Con: Gavin Hauptfleisch 12', 33', 50', 59', 64' (5/6); Cards: Ivan Ludick (yellow card) 78'	Scoreboard; Report	Try: Mark Hodgkiss 55', 79'; Clearance Khumalo 67'; Reinier Ehlers 75'; Con: Robert du Preez 67', 75' (2/3); Chris Smith 56' (1/1); Cards: Lungelo Chonco (yellow card) 63' to 73'

NMMU Stadium, Port Elizabeth
Referee: Christie du Preez & Rodney Boneparte

Round 2

10 February 2014
16:45

Maties	16–33	UCT Ikey Tigers
Try: Johnny Kôtze 8'; Robert du Preez 73'; Con: Robert du Preez 9', 74' (2/2); Cards: Beyers de Villiers (yellow card) 20' to 30'	Scoreboard Report	Try: Jason Klaasen 22', 43'; Lihleli Xoli 28'; Liam Slatem 75'; Con: Dean Grant 23', 44', 76' (3/4); Pen: Dean Grant 40', 60' (2/2)

Danie Craven Stadium, Stellenbosch
Referee: Daniel Fortuin & Francois Pretorius

Round 3

17 February 2014
19:00

NWU Pukke	21–33	Maties
Try: Luther Obi 45'; HP Swart 52'; Dillon Smit 70'; Con: Adriaan Engelbrecht 52', 70' (2/3)	Scoreboard; Report	Try: Beyers de Villiers 3'; Johnny Kôtze 13'; Robert du Preez 30'; Louis Jordaan 54'; Con: Robert du Preez 4', 31', 54' (3/4); Pen: Robert du Preez 72', 80' (2/2); Cards: Niel Oelofse (yellow card) 37' to 48'

Fanie du Toit Sport Ground, Potchefstroom
Referee: Pro Legoete

Round 4

24 February 2014
19:00

Maties	18–15	Wits
Try: Frederick Kirsten 37'; Jan de Klerk 53'; Robert du Preez 56'; Con: Robert du Preez 56' (1/3)	Scoreboard; Report	Try: Jason Fraser 12'; Ashlon Davids 24'; Ruhan Nel 83'; Con: Ashlon Davids (0/1); Matt Torrance (0/2); Cards: JJ Breet (yellow card) 34' to 44'; Kyle Wood (yellow card) 51' to 61'; Brent Crossley (yellow card) 81'

Danie Craven Stadium, Stellenbosch
Referee: Francois Pretorius & Quinton Immelman

Round 5

3 March 2014
19:00

Maties	13–13	UFS Shimlas
Try: Robert du Preez 42'; Jean Nel 70'; Con: Robert du Preez 43' (1/2)	Scoreboard; Report	Try: Justin Pappin 20'; Sethu Tom 32'; Con: Gouws Prinsloo 21' (1/2); Cards: Tienie Burger (yellow card) 69'

Danie Craven Stadium, Stellenbosch
Referee: Cwengile Jadezweni & Christie du Preez

Round 6

10 March 2014
19:00

UJ	8–24	Maties
Try: Van Zyl Botha 61'; Con: Marais Schmidt 62' (1/1)	Scoreboard	Try: Jan de Klerk 4'; Beyers de Villiers 24', 34'; Con: Robert du Preez 5', 25', 35' (3/3)

UJ Stadium, Johannesburg
Referee: Rasta Rasivhenge & Tahla Ntshakaza

Round 7

17 March 2014
19:00

Maties	41–24	UP Tuks
Try: Robert du Preez 46'; Craig Barry 53', 75'; Caleb Smith 58'; Chris Smith 80'; Con: Robert du Preez 46', 54', 59', 76' (4/5); Pen: Robert du Preez 64', 79' (2/2); Cards: Mark Hodgkiss (yellow card) 39' to 49'	Scoreboard	Try: Basil Short 4'; Duncan Matthews 16'; Andrew Beerwinkel 67'; Con: Tian Schoeman 5', 17', 68' (3/3)

Danie Craven Stadium, Stellenbosch
Attendance: 8,500
Referee: Jaco Kotze & Rodney Boneparte

Semi-final

24 March 2014
16:30

UCT Ikey Tigers	20–8	Maties
Try: Lihleli Xoli 41'; Mike Botha 67'; Con: Dean Grant 41', 68' (2/2); Pen: Dean Grant 49', 60' (2/2); Cards: Richard Stewart (yellow card) 24' to 34'; Liam Slatem (yellow card) 71'	Scoreboard	Try: Louis Nel 72'; Con: Robert du Preez 73' (1/1)

UCT Rugby Fields, Cape Town
Referee: Stephan Geldenhuys & Rodney Boneparte

2015 Results

Round 1

9 February 2015
19:00

UCT Ikey Tigers	32–32	Maties
Try: Dylan Sage 4'; Mark Prior 43'; Guy Alexander 72' penalty try 77'; Con: Warren Seals 5', 44', 73', 78' (4/4)	Report; Scoreboard	Try: JP Lewis 39', 56'; Kobus van Dyk 52'; Craig Barry 66'; Con: Ernst Stapelberg 40' (1/1); Brandon Thomson 53', 57', 67' (3/3); Pen: Brandon Thomson (0/1)

UCT Rugby Fields, Cape Town
Referee: Francois Pretorius & Rodney Boneparte

Round 2

16 February 2015
19:00

Maties	26–26	NWU Pukke
Try: Kobus van Dyk 9'; Beyers de Villiers 14', 29'; Ian Groenewald 78'; Con: Koos Loubser 10' (1/1); Ernst Stapelberg (0/1); Brandon Thomson 79' (1/1); Cards: Ernst Stapelberg (yellow card) 5' to 15'	Report; Scoreboard	Try: Dillon Smit 1' penalty try 5'; Rhyno Smith 56'; Dean Stokes 66'; Con: Rhyno Smith 2', 6' (2/4); Cards: Jeandré Rudolph (yellow card) 28' to 38'

Danie Craven Stadium, Stellenbosch
Referee: Stephan Geldenhuys & Tahla Ntshakaza

Round 3

23 February 2015
19:00

UP Tuks	53–8	Maties
Try: Jannes Kirsten 14'; Wiaan Liebenberg 21'; Reniel Hugo 24'; Rudolph Smith 32'; Dewald Human 41'; Jermaine Kleinsmith 50'; Nqoba Mxoli 70'; Con: Joshua Stander 22', 24', 33', 42', 51', 71' (6/7)	Report; Scoreboard	Try: JP Lewis 17'; Con: Brandon Thomson 18' (1/1)

LC de Villiers Stadium, Pretoria
Referee: Lourens van der Merwe & Jaco Kotze

Round4

2 March 2015
18:30

UFS Shimlas	21–16	Maties
Try: Niel Marais 5'; AJ Coertzen 20'; Daniel Maartens 64'; Con: Niel Marais 6', 21' (2/3); Pen: Niel Marais (0/1); Cards: Henco Venter (yellow card) 80'	Report; Scoreboard	Try: John-Hubert Meyer 14'; Bjorn Bernardo 26'; Con: Ernst Stapelberg 15', 27' (2/2)

Shimla Park, Bloemfontein
Referee: Stephan Geldenhuys & Tahla Ntshakaza

Round 5

9 March 2015
16:45

Maties	16–15	UJ
Try: Beyers de Villiers 58'; Jacobus van der Merwe 69'; Con: Ernst Stapelberg 59' (1/1); Brandon Thomson 70' (1/1)	Report; Scoreboard	Try: Adrian Vermeulen 3'; Bradley Moolman 51'; Con: Jaco Fourie 4' (1/2); Pen: Jaco Fourie 37' (1/2)

Danie Craven Stadium, Stellenbosch
Referee: Lourens van der Merwe & Jaco Kotze

Round 6

16 March 2015
18:30

Maties	26–16	NMMU Madibaz
Try: Beyers de Villiers 4'; Kobus van Dyk 48'; Niel Oelofse 55'; Michael Muller 68'; Con: Brandon Thomson 56', 69' (2/4)	Report; Scoreboard	Try: Devon Lailvaux 11'; Andisa Ntsila 44'; Con: Steven Hansel 12', 45' (2/2); Cards: Andisa Ntsila (yellow card) 48'

Danie Craven Stadium, Stellenbosch
Referee: Quinton Immelman & Cwengile Jadezweni

Round 7

23 March 2015
18:30

CUT Ixias	8–53	Maties
Try: Lethole Mokoena 34'; Con: Duan Pretorius 35' (1/1); Cards: Mosego Toolo (yellow card) 16' to 26'; Duan Pretorius (yellow card) 59' to 71'	Report; Scoreboard	Try: Bjorn Bernardo 4'; Coenraad Fick 18', 31', 61'; Paul Streicher 54'; Kobus van Dyk 73'; Derick Linde 76'; Con: Brandon Thomson 5', 19', 32', 55' (4/5); Ernst Stapelberg 74', 77' (2/2)

CUT Stadium, Bloemfontein
Attendance: 1,500
Referee: Pro Legoete & Jaco Pretorius

2016 Results

Round 1

8 February 2016
18:30

Maties	40–0	CUT Ixias
Try: Beyers de Villiers 2'; Kobus van Dyk 20', 26'; Ernst Stapelberg 29'; Craig Corbett 51'; Edwill van der Merwe 76' (2BP); Con: Ernst Stapelberg 2', 20', 29', 76' (4/6)	Report; Scoreboard; Video

Danie Craven Stadium, Stellenbosch
Referee: Francois Pretorius

Round 2

15 February 2016
16:45

NMMU Madibaz	25–27	Maties
Try: Kevin Kaba 61' (2BP); Yamkela Ngam 70' (2BP); Marzuq Maarman 76'; Con: Tom Kean (0/3); Pen: Simon Bolze 17', 28' (2/3)	Report; Scoreboard; Video	Try: Paul Streicher 32'; Beyers de Villiers 40'; Craig Corbett 46'; Brendon Nell 81'; Con: Ernst Stapelberg 40', 82' (2/4); Pen: Ernst Stapelberg 66' (1/1); Cards: Beyers de Villiers (yellow card) 70' to 79'; Ian Groenewald (yellow card) 74'

NMMU Stadium, Port Elizabeth
Referee: Sindile Ngcese

Round 3

22 February 2016
19:00

Maties	29–16	UP Tuks
Try: Duncan Saal 15' (4BP), 31' (4BP), 72' (2BP); Con: Ernst Stapelberg 32', 73' (2/3)	Report; Scoreboard; Video	Try: Keanan van Wyk 10' (4BP); Corniel Els 44'; Con: Joshua Stander 45' (1/2)

Danie Craven Stadium, Stellenbosch
Referee: Rodney Boneparte

Round 4

14 March 2016
19:00

Maties	60–13	UCT Ikey Tigers
Try: John-Roy Jenkinson 9', 38' (2BP); Duncan Saal 22'; Edwill van der Merwe 31', 74' (4BP); Kobus van Dyk 55'; Craig Barry 71' (4BP); Con: Ernst Stapelberg 10', 23', 39', 56' (4/5); Chris Smith 72', 75' (2/2); Pen: Ernst Stapelberg 43' (1/1)	Report; Scoreboard	Try: Luke Stringer 77'; Con: Robert Anderson 78' (1/1); Pen: Tom Bednall 5', 12' (2/2)

FNB Stadium, Johannesburg
Referee: Archie Sehlako

Round 5

21 March 2016
14:45

NWU Pukke	12–56	Maties
Try: Malherbe Swart 19'; Benhard Janse van Rensburg 44'; Con: Rhyno Smith 45' (1/2)	Report; Scoreboard	Try: Craig Barry 13', 54' (2BP); Edwill van der Merwe 27' (4BP); Paul Streicher 34' (4BP); Beyers de Villiers 39'; Duncan Saal 68' (2BP); Con: Ernst Stapelberg 14', 28', 55', 69' (4/6); Pen: Ernst Stapelberg 52', 62' (2/2)

FNB Stadium, Johannesburg
Referee: Ben Crouse

Round 6

24 March 2016
19:00

Maties	35–14	UFS Shimlas
Try: Remu Malan 9' (4BP) penalty try 17'; Edwill van der Merwe 28'; Ernst Stapelberg 48'; Kobus van Dyk 74'; Con: Ernst Stapelberg 18', 49', 75' (3/5); Cards: Remu Malan (yellow card) 35' to 44'; Craig Barry (yellow card) 78'	Report; Scoreboard	Try: Mosolwa Mafuma 3'; Arthur Williams 39'; Con: Marco Mason 3', 40' (2/2); Cards: Teunis Nieuwoudt (yellow card) 17' to 27'

Cape Town Stadium, Cape Town
Referee: Cwengile Jadezweni

Round 7

28 March 2016
19:00

UJ	42–16	Maties
Try: Ronald Brown 33'; Kobus Porter 39' (4BP); Caswell Khoza 67'; Etienne Oosthuizen 69'; Con: Divan Nel 34', 40', 70' (3/4); Pen: Divan Nel 8', 17', 63' (3/3); Drop: Divan Nel 21' (1/1)	Report; Scoreboard	Try: Brandon Asher-Wood 5' (4BP); Carlisle Nel 81' (2BP); Con: Chris Smith (0/2); Cards: Chris Smit (yellow card) 34' to 41'

Cape Town Stadium, Cape Town
Referee: Francois Pretorius

Semi-final

4 April 2016
19:00

Maties	49–11	UP Tuks
Try: Edwill van der Merwe 4'; Brandon Asher-Wood 16' (2BP); Beyers de Villiers 36', 49'; Remu Malan 74'; Con: Ernst Stapelberg 5', 17', 37', 50', 75' (5/5); Pen: Ernst Stapelberg 13', 30', 44', 79' (4/4)	Report; Scoreboard	Try: Dries Swanepoel 31' (4BP); Con: Joshua Stander 32' (1/1)

Danie Craven Stadium, Stellenbosch
Referee: AJ Jacobs

Final

11 April 2016
19:00

Maties	6–7	NWU Pukke
Pen: Chris Smith 46', 50' (2/3); Drop: Chris Smith (0/1); Cards: Chris Smit (yellow card) 83'; Remu Malan (yellow card) 88'	Report; Scoreboard	Try: Marno Redelinghuys 89'; Con: Rhyno Smith 90' (1/1)

Danie Craven Stadium, Stellenbosch
Referee: Lourens van der Merwe

2017 Results

Round 1

30 January 2017
19:00

UP Tuks	13–9	Maties
Try: Chris Massyn 27'; Tinus de Beer 74'; Con: Tinus de Beer (0/2); Pen: Tinus de Beer 57' (1/2); Cards: Tinus de Beer (yellow card) 8' to 19'	Report; Scoreboard	Pen: Ernst Stapelberg 18', 37', 60' (3/5)

Loftus Versfeld, Pretoria
Referee: Jaco Pretorius

Round 2

6 February 2017
18:30

Maties	26–14	Wits
Try: Craig Corbett 44'; Kyle Steyn 46' (2BP); Con: Ernst Stapelberg 46' (1/2); Pen: Ernst Stapelberg 5', 21', 63', 68' (4/4); Cards: Duncan Saal (yellow card) 78'	Report; Scoreboard	Try: Constant Beckerling 11'; Con: Warren Gilbert (0/1); Pen: Warren Gilbert 49', 55' (2/2); Drop: Warren Gilbert 53' (1/1); Cards: Kwanele Ngema (yellow card) 15' to 25'

Danie Craven Stadium, Stellenbosch
Referee: Francois Pretorius

Round 3

13 February 2017
19:00

Maties	31–9	NWU Pukke
Try: Mitchell Carstens 5'; Kobus van Dyk 17'; Edwill van der Merwe 73'; Con: Ernst Stapelberg 6' (1/2); Chris Smith 74' (1/1); Pen: Ernst Stapelberg 13', 37', 46', 58' (4/4); Cards: Craig Corbett (yellow card) 50' to 60'	Report; Scoreboard	Try: Jimmy Mpailane 35'; Con: Schalk Hugo 36' (1/1); Pen: Schalk Hugo (0/1); Cards: Dean Stokes (yellow card) 62' to 72'

Danie Craven Stadium, Stellenbosch
Referee: Rasta Rasivhenge

Round 4

20 February 2017
18:30

Maties	35–16	NMMU Madibaz
Try: Brendon Nell 22', 49'; Ian Groenewald 41'; Craig Barry 74'; Michal Haznar 77'; Con: Chris Smith 42', 49', 74', 77' (4/5)	Report; Scoreboard	Try: Wynand Grassmann 32'; SF Nieuwoudt 59'; Con: Tom Kean (0/2); Pen: Tom Kean 19', 39' (2/3); Cards: SF Nieuwoudt (yellow card) 69' to 79'; Brandon Brown (yellow card) 71'

Danie Craven Stadium, Stellenbosch
Referee: Francois Pretorius

Round 5

27 February 2017
16:45

UCT Ikey Tigers	16 - 47	Maties

UCT Rugby Fields, Cape Town

Round 6

6 March 2017
19:00

UFS Shimlas	12 - 60	Maties

Shimla Park, Bloemfontein

Round 7

Bye/s: Maties

Round 8

20 March 2017	CUT Ixias	44 - 73	Maties	CUT Stadium, Bloemfontein
18:30

Round 9

27 March 2017
19:00

Maties	65 - 19	UJ

Danie Craven Stadium, Stellenbosch

Semi-final

3 April 2017
19:00

Maties	22 - 14	UJ

Danie Craven Stadium, Stellenbosch

Final

17 April 2017
19:00

UP Tuks	28 -21	Maties
Try: Chris Massyn 9'; Divan Rossouw 45'; Con: Tinus de Beer 10', 47'; Pen: Tinus de Beer 29', 40', 52', 66'; Cards: Jaco Holtzhausen (yellow card) 54' to 64'		Try: Janco Venter 5'; Con: Chris Smith 7'; Pen: Chris Smith 12', 44', 55'; Tiaan Swanepoel 24'; Cards: Janco Venter (yellow card) 16' to 26'

LC de Villiers Stadium, Pretoria
Referee: Jaco Pretorius

2018 Results

Round 1

29 January 2018
19:00

UJ	3–31	Maties

UJ Stadium, Johannesburg

Round 2

5 February 2018
18:30

Maties	56–21	UFS Shimlas

Danie Craven Stadium, Stellenbosch

Round 3

12 February 2018
19:00

Maties	24–16	UP Tuks

Danie Craven Stadium, Stellenbosch

Round 4

19 February 2018
18:30

Maties	75–12	CUT Ixias

Danie Craven Stadium, Stellenbosch

Round 5

26 February 2018
16:45

Wits	30–30	Maties

Wits Rugby Stadium, Johannesburg

Round 6

26 February 2018
19:00

UFS Shimlas	12–49	UJ

Shimla Park, Bloemfontein

Round 7

12 March 2018
18:30

NMU Madibaz	0–19	Maties

NMU Stadium, Port Elizabeth

Round 8

Bye/s: Maties

Round 9

26 March 2018
19:00

NWU Pukke	33–33	Maties

Fanie du Toit Sport Ground, Potchefstroom

Semi-final

2 April 2018
19:00

Maties	65–18	Wits

Danie Craven Stadium, Stellenbosch

Final

16 April 2018
19:00

Maties	40–7	NWU Pukke

Danie Craven Stadium, Stellenbosch

2019 Results

Round 1

4 February 2019
19:00

Maties	33–17	Wits

Danie Craven Stadium, Stellenbosch

Round 2

11 February 2019
19:00

UCT Ikey Tigers	5–66	Maties

UCT Rugby Fields, Cape Town

Round 3

18 February 2019
19:00

UP Tuks	24–26	Maties

LC de Villiers Stadium, Pretoria

Round 4

25 February 2019
18:30

CUT Ixias	15–50	Maties

CUT Stadium, Bloemfontein

Round 5

4 March 2019
19:00

Maties	43–15	NWU Pukke

Danie Craven Stadium, Stellenbosch

Round 6

11 March 2019
18:30

Maties	24–13	UJ

Danie Craven Stadium, Stellenbosch

Round 7

Bye/s: Maties

Round 8

25 March 2019
19:00

UFS Shimlas	14–59	Maties

Shimla Park

Round 9

1 April 2019
18:30

Maties	84–26	UWC

Danie Craven Stadium, Stellenbosch

Semi-final

8 April 2019
19:00

Maties	47–5	UFS Shimlas

Danie Craven Stadium, Stellenbosch

Final

15 April 2019
19:00

Maties	34–12	UP Tuks

Danie Craven Stadium, Stellenbosch

2020 Results

Round 1

3 February 2020

Maties	67–16	Shimlas

Danie Craven Stadium, Stellenbosch

Round 2

17 February 2020

Maties	67–24	CUT

Danie Craven Stadium, Stellenbosch

Round 3

24 February 2020

UWC	5–77	Maties

UWC Sports Stadium

Round 4

2 March 2020

Maties	13–7	UP Tuks

Danie Craven Stadium, Stellenbosch

Round 5

9 March 2020

Maties	8–7	UCT

Danie Craven Stadium, Stellenbosch

Round 6

16 March 2020

NWU-Pukke	Cancelled	Maties

Fanie du Toit Sports Grounds

Round 7

23 March 2020

Wits	Cancelled	Maties

Wits Rugby Stadium, Johannesburg

Round 8

30 March 2020

UJ	Cancelled	Maties

UJ Stadium, Johannesburg

2021 Results

Round 1

5 April 2021

UCT	26–20	Maties

UCT Rugby Fields, Cape Town

Round 2

8 April 2021

Maties	43–21	UWC

Danie Craven Stadium, Stellenbosch

Round 3

11 April 2021

Maties	19–13	Wits

Danie Craven Stadium, Stellenbosch

Round 4

22 April 2021

UP Tuks	24–31	Maties

Tuks Rugby Stadium

Round 5

27 April 2021

Maties	26–12	NWU-Pukke

Danie Craven Stadium, Stellenbosch

Round 6

30 April 2021

CUT	23–18	Maties

CUT Rugby Stadium

Round 7

17 May 2021

Maties	44–14	NMU Madibaz

Danie Craven Stadium, Stellenbosch

Round 8

20 May 2021

Maties	49–14	UJ

Danie Craven Stadium, Stellenbosch

Round 9

23 May 2021

Shimlas	24–81	Maties

Shimla Park, Bloemfontein

Semi-final

28 May 2021

Maties	35–44	UP Tuks

Danie Craven Stadium, Stellenbosch

2022 Results

Round 1

14 February 2022
19:00

UP Tuks	9–19	Maties
Pen: Burger 12' 20' 50'	Report	Try: Swart 70'; Con: Mathee 71'; Pen: Van der Bank 11' 23' 43'; Mathee 80'

Danie Craven Stadium, Stellenbosch

Round 2

21 February 2022
19:00

UFS Shimlas	50–28	Maties
	Report

Shimla Park, Bloemfontein

Round 3

28 February 2022
19:00

Maties	37–10	Wits
	Report

Danie Craven Stadium, Stellenbosch

Round 4

7 March 2022
19:00

Maties	40–36	UJ
	Report

Danie Craven Stadium, Stellenbosch

Round 5

14 March 2022
19:00

CUT Ixias	19–52	Maties
	Report

CUT Stadium, Bloemfontein

Round 6

21 March 2022
19:00

Maties	20–12	NWU Eagles
	Report

Danie Craven Stadium, Stellenbosch

Round 7

28 March 2022
19:00

UCT Ikey Tigers	44–27	Maties
	Report

UCT Rugby Fields, Cape Town

Round 8

4 April 2022
19:00

Maties	61–21	NMU Madibaz
	Report

Danie Craven Stadium, Stellenbosch

Round 9

11 April 2022
19:00

Maties	40–31	UWC
	Report

Danie Craven Stadium, Stellenbosch

Semi-final

18 April 2022
17:00

UCT Ikey Tigers	19–58	Maties
	Report

UCT Rugby Fields, Cape Town

Final

25 April 2022
19:15

Maties	23–29	UP Tuks
	Report

Danie Craven Stadium, Stellenbosch

2023 Results

Round 1

20 February 2023
17:00

Maties	21–19	UCT Ikey Tigers

Danie Craven Stadium, Stellenbosch

Round 2

27 February 2023
17:00

Maties	19–23	CUT Ixias

Danie Craven Stadium, Stellenbosch

Round 3

6 March 2023
17:00

NWU Eagles	28–31	Maties

Fanie Du Toit Sports Grounds

Round 4

13 March 2023
17:00

Wits	54–56	Maties

Wits Rugby Stadium, Johannesburg

Round 5

20 March 2023
17:00

Maties	46–35	UP Tuks

Danie Craven Stadium, Stellenbosch

Round 6

27 March 2023
14:00

UJ	47–38	Maties

UJ Stadium, Johannesburg

Round 7

3 April 2023
17:00

Maties	12–44	UFS Shimlas

Danie Craven Stadium, Stellenbosch

Semi-final

10 April 2023
17:00

NWU Eagles	19–10	Maties

Fanie Du Toit Sports Grounds

2024 Results

Round 1

19 February 2024
17:00

Maties	12–23	NWU Eagles

Danie Craven Stadium, Stellenbosch

Round 2

26 February 2024
17:00

UCT Ikey Tigers	10–15	Maties

The Green Mile

Round 3

4 March 2024
17:00

Maties	23–12	Wits

Danie Craven Stadium, Stellenbosch

Round 4

11 March 2024
17:00

Maties	54–22	UJ

Danie Craven Stadium, Stellenbosch

Round 5

18 March 2024
17:00

UWC	14–63	Maties

UWC Stadium

Round 6

25 March 2024
17:00

UFS Shimlas	29–38	Maties

Shimla Park, Bloemfontein

Round 7

8 April 2024
14:45

CUT Ixias	20–26	Maties

CUT Rugby Stadium

Semi-final

15 April 2024
14:45

Maties	24–38	UFS Shimlas

Danie Craven Stadium, Stellenbosch

2025 Results

Round 1

17 February 2025
19:00

Maties	41–37	UFS Shimlas

Danie Craven Stadium, Stellenbosch

Round 2

24 February 2025
19:00

NWU Pukke	27–29	Maties

Fanie Du Toit Sports Ground

Round 3

3 March 2025
19:00

Maties	54–0	CUT Ixias

Danie Craven Stadium, Stellenbosch

Round 4

10 March 2025
19:00

UJ	7–25	Maties

UJ Stadium

Round 5

17 March 2025
19:00

Maties	31–24	UCT Ikey Tigers

Danie Craven Stadium, Stellenbosch

Round 6

24 March 2025
19:00

Maties	19–29	UP Tuks

Danie Craven Stadium, Stellenbosch

Round 7

31 March 2025
19:00

Wits	7–47	Maties

Attendance: Wits Stadium

Semi-final

7 April 2025
19:00

Maties	19–07	UFS Shimlas

Danie Craven Stadium, Stellenbosch

Final

14 April 2025
19:00

Maties	44–21	UCT Ikey Tigers

Danie Craven Stadium, Stellenbosch

== Teams ==
=== Current Team ===
2025 Maties Rugby Team
Name	Age	Position	Height	Weight	School	Notable Honours
Ezekial Ngobeni (Captain)	20	Scrumhalf	1.75 m	77 kg	Tygerberg High	SA Junior Springbok Squad (2024)
Carel vd Merwe (Vice-Captain)	21	Loose Forward	1.97 m	112 kg	De Kuilen High	WP U21
Janu Basson	22	Prop	1.82 m	115 kg	Durbanville High	Maties 1st XV (2023/24); Pumas U20
Prince Mulela	22	Prop	1.80 m	116 kg	King Edward VII	Lions U21 (2023)
Wilbur Loubser	20	Prop	1.84 m	113 kg	Paul Roos	WP U21
Jason Johnson	21	Prop	1.84 m	108 kg	Paul Roos	Pumas U20 (2021)
Ammaar Burton	21	Prop	1.83 m	122 kg	Milnerton High	Maties 1st XV (2024)
Herman Lubbe	19	Prop	1.95 m	88 kg	Stellenberg	SA U20
Luthando Makula	19	Hooker	1.77 m	100 kg	Northwood	Maties U20; Sharks U18
Armand Combrink	20	Hooker	1.68 m	102 kg	Oakdale Agricultural High	Namibia International
CJ Erasmus	20	Hooker	1.87 m	112 kg	Pearson High	Junior Springboks
Dante Burger	21	Lock	1.95 m	116 kg	Paarl Boys' High	SA U17 (2019); Clermont U20 (2021); WP U20 (2022/23)
Riley Norton	18	Lock	1.98 m	108 kg	Paul Roos	SA U20 Rugby (Captain)
Slabbert Maartens	20	Lock	2.02 m	114 kg	Paarl Gymnasium	Maties 1st XV (2024)
Michael Chettoa	21	Lock	—	108 kg	St Benedict's College	Maties 1st XV (2024)
Zuko Posma	19	Lock	1.99 m	110 kg	Selborne College	Maties 1st XV (2024)
Eric Basson	23	Loose Forward	1.88 m	104 kg	Paarl Gymnasium	Currie Cup (2021); WP U21 (2023); Bulls U20 (2023)
Caleb Dreyden	18	Loose Forward	1.76 m	78 kg	Rondebosch Boys' High	Rondebosch 1st XV
Louw du Toit	19	Loose Forward	1.80 m	103 kg	Paarl Gymnasium	WP U19
Fortune Mpofu	21	Loose Forward	1.86 m	100 kg	Michaelhouse	Maties 1st XV
Luan Botha	21	Loose Forward	1.96 m	109 kg	Paarl Gymnasium	Maties 1st XV (2024)
Ethan Snyman	22	Loose Forward	1.90 m	106 kg	Hoërskool Monument	Maties 1st XV (2022–25); WP U20 (2021/22)
Nikus Coller	19	Loose Forward	1.87 m	94 kg	Paarl Gymnasium	WP U19
Armand Fiedl	23	Loose Forward	1.87 m	100 kg	Hoërskool Waterkloof	Bulls Craven Week (2019)
Zhuan-Li James	22	Loose Forward	1.79 m	92 kg	Bellville Technical High	WP Super League A
McKyle Volmoer	22	Scrumhalf	1.65 m	73 kg	Charlie Hofmeyr High	Maties 1st XV; WP U21
Liam Stander	20	Scrumhalf	1.75 m	73 kg	Paul Roos	Maties 1st XV (2024)
Warrick Jones	20	Scrumhalf	1.75 m	78 kg	Rondebosch Boys' High	Maties 1st XV (2024)
Kyle van Wyk	20	Flyhalf	1.87 m	87 kg	Selborne College	Border U18 (2022); Maties Young Guns (2023)
MC van Heerden-Smith	22	Flyhalf	1.81 m	90 kg	Paul Roos	Maties 1st XV
Luca Potgieter	18	Centre	1.88 m	100 kg	Outeniqua High	SWD Craven Week (2024)
Ryan Manual	21	Centre	1.85 m	88 kg	Glenwood High	WP U21; Sharks U19
CJ Marx	21	Centre	1.85 m	101 kg	Diamantveld High	Maties 1st XV (2022–24)
Ethan Regue	21	Centre	1.83 m	89 kg	De Kuilen High	Maties 1st XV (2024)
Simon Liversage	18	Centre	1.90 m	93 kg	Diamantveld High	Griquas U18 Craven Week
Jean-Marc Trichard	21	Wing	1.76 m	89 kg	Paarl Gymnasium	WP U18 Craven Week
Hippolyte Draux	21	Wing	1.85 m	84 kg	Em Lyon Business School	Racing Academy Paris
Junior Leotlela	21	Wing	1.76 m	81 kg	St John's College	Junior Springboks
Pretorius Ekeji	18	Wing	1.84 m	100 kg	Grey College	Free State Craven Week
Grant de Jager	20	Wing	1.84 m	102 kg	Middelburg High	Western Province U21
Dylan Miller	19	Fullback	1.83 m	86 kg	Rondebosch Boys' High	SA Schools; SA U18
Eldrige Jack	19	Fullback	1.79 m	80 kg	Northern Cape High	Griquas Craven Week
Leighton Julies	20	Fullback	1.76 m	84 kg	Kylemore Secondary	Maties 1st XV (2024); Boland U18

=== Previous Teams ===
The following players played at previous editions of the Varsity Cup:

2017 Maties squad
Forwards	Saud Abrahams • Wesley Adonis • Jake Blew • Mitchell Carstens • Craig Corbett • Beyers de Villiers • Ian Groenewald • Wikus Groenewald • Christiaan Hamman • Freddie Kirsten • Hendrik Luus • Johan Momsen • Devon Nash • Niel Oelofse • Stephan Streicher • Jacobus van der Merwe • Kobus van Dyk • Johann van Niekerk • • Janco Venter • Did not play: • Iver Aanhuizen • Justin Benn
Backs	Craig Barry • Logan Boonzaaier • Paul de Wet • Michal Haznar • Brendon Nell • Duncan Saal • Chris Smit • Chris Smith • Ernst Stapelberg • Kyle Steyn • Tiaan Swanepoel • Edwill van der Merwe • Braam Venter • Did not play: • Remu Malan • Ryan Muller • Carlisle Nel • Adriaan van der Bank
Coach	Hawies Fourie

2016 Maties squad
Forwards	Saud Abrahams • Wesley Adonis • Conal Brown • Craig Corbett • Beyers de Villiers • Ian Groenewald • Martin Groenewald • Marko Janse van Rensburg • John-Roy Jenkinson • Freddie Kirsten • Boeta Kleinhans • Robey Labuschagné • Geor Malan • Derick Marais • Justin Moberly • Johan Momsen • Niel Oelofse • Martin Oosthuizen • Tyron Schultz • Jacobus van der Merwe • Wilhelm van der Sluys • Kobus van Dyk • Janco Venter • Did not play: • Iver Aanhuizen • Michael Smuts de Waal • CF du Toit • Hadley Hendricks • Liam Hendricks • Devon Nash • Francois Jacobus van der Merwe
Backs	Brandon Asher-Wood • Craig Barry • Bjorn Bernardo • SP Ferreira • Carlton Fortune • Remu Malan • Carlisle Nel • Brendon Nell • Duncan Saal • Chris Smit • Chris Smith • Ernst Stapelberg • Kyle Steyn • Paul Streicher • Edwill van der Merwe • Braam Venter • Jason Worrall • Did not play: • Eduan Keyter • Ronald Rijk Albertus Melck • Louis Nel • James Edward Vorster
Coach	Hawies Fourie

2015 Maties Varsity Cup Team
Wesley Adonis
Justin Benn
Lungelo Chonco
Craig Corbett
AJ de Klerk
Beyers de Villiers
Coenraad Fick
Neethling Gericke
Migael Grobler
Ian Groenewald
Marko Janse van Rensburg
Derick Linde
John-Hubert Meyer
Devon Nash
Niel Oelofse
Grant Prior
Wilhelm van der Sluys
Jacobus van der Merwe
Kobus van Dyk
Janco Venter
Human Carstens
Gareth Theunis de Bruin
Jacobus de Kock
Johan Roual de Villiers
Andreas Rufus Dercksen
Renier Ehlers
Athenkosi Gaqa
Liam Hendricks
Rees Keene
Freddie Kirsten
Boeta Kleinhans
Basil Liebenberg
Justin Moberly
GD Orlam
Tangeni Sindano Shatiwa
Willem Jacobus Smith
Attie Francois van Rensburg
Willem van Schalkwyk
Brandon Asher-Wood
Craig Barry
Bjorn Bernardo
Jamie Joseph
Kyle Leibrandt
JP Lewis
Koos Loubser
Remu Malan
Michael Muller
Jean Nel
Louis Nel
Ernst Stapelberg
Paul Streicher
Brandon Thomson
Christoff van Tonder
Louis Jordaan
Christopher James Keet
William Robin Keet
Jacquin Adrian Marthinus
Carlisle Nel
Ryan Oosthuizen
Jakobus Putter
Chris Smit
Chris Smith
Kyle Steyn
Jan Abraham Venter
Divan Visser
James Edward Vorster
Jason Worrall
Chris Rossouw, (coach)

2014 Maties Varsity Cup Team
Wesley Adonis
Justin Benn
Lungelo Chonco
Tertius Daniller
Jan de Klerk
Beyers de Villiers
Charl de Villiers
Renier Ehlers
Neethling Gericke
Ian Groenewald
Liam Hendricks
Nicol Heyns
Frederick Kirsten
Boeta Kleinhans
Helmut Lehmann
Koos Loubser
Niel Oelofse
Brendan Pitzer
Jurg Streicher
Wilhelm van der Sluys
Brianton Booysen
Keith Chenoweth
Tebogo Letlape
Derick Linde
Teunis Nieuwoudt
Grant Prior
Mark Prior
Alistair Vermaak
Craig Barry
Bjorn Bernardo
Robert du Preez
JW Dürr
Mark Hodgkiss
Gerhard Jordaan
Louis Jordaan
Clearance Khumalo
Johnny Kôtze
Jean Nel
Louis Nel
Caleb Smith
Chris Smith
Brandon Asher-Wood
Ryno Eksteen
Janco Gunter
JP Lewis
Warren Seals
Jacobus de Kock
Lars Esdar
Dirk Kotzé
Chris Rossouw, (coach)

2013 Maties Varsity Cup Team
Brianton Booysen
Lungelo Chonco
Nick de Jager
Jan de Klerk
Beyers de Villiers
Charl de Villiers
Neethling Gericke
Os Hamman
Reniel Hugo
Reuben Johannes
Frederick Kirsten
Helmut Lehmann
Niel Oelofse
Brandon Pitzer
Jurg Streicher
Hein van der Merwe
Wilhelm van der Sluys
Jurie van Vuuren
Alistair Vermaak
Schalk Ferreira
Attie Joubert
Boeta Kleinhans
Hugo Kloppers
Basil Liebenberg
Derick Linde
Cameron Lindsay
Alfred Ries
Erik van Zyl
James Alexander
Craig Barry
Hayden de Villiers
Dean Grant
Dean Hammond
Mark Hodgskiss
Louis Jordaan
Clearance Khumalo
JP Lewis
Jean Nel
Ryan Nell
JH Potgieter
Warren Seals
Andries Truter
Rob Ahlers
Jarryd Buys
Wessel Coetzee
Jan de Wet
Gerhard Jordaan
Johnny Kôtze
Pieter Peens
Caleb Smith
Gideon Strydom
Nico van der Westhuizen
Christof van Tonder
Devon Williams
Chris Rossouw, (Coach)

== Young Guns ==
The Maties Young Guns are the under-20 rugby side for Stellenbosch University (Maties) and play in the junior division of South Africa's Varsity Cup. Known as a breeding ground for future professional talent, the team is one of the most competitive U20 setups in the country, playing their home games out of the famous Danie Craven Stadium. Their most recent championships include their infamous back-to-back wins in 2018 & 2019.

Maties Young Guns Record
Year	Pos	P	W	D	L	PF	PA	PD	TB	LB	Pts	W%	Result
2012	2	3	2	0	1	128	52	+76	3	1	12	66%	2nd
2013	2	3	3	0	0	123	42	+81	3	0	15	100%	2nd
2014	3	3	2	0	1	92	44	+48	2	1	11	66%	SF Loss
2015	7	4	0	0	4	57	138	-81	0	1	1	0%	7th
2016	4	4	2	1	1	152	135	+17	3	0	13	62%	-
2017	1	1	1	0	0	44	13	+31	1	0	5	100%	2nd
2018	1	4	4	0	0	207	66	+141	4	0	22	100%	Champions
2019	1	6	6	0	0	332*	85*	247*	*	*	*	100%	Champions
2022	2	6	1	0	5	123*	167*	-44*	*	*	*	17%	SF Loss
2023	1	6	5	1	0	226	165	+61	5	0	29	92%	2nd
2024	2	6	3	0	3	251	165	+86	4	1	21	50%	SF Loss
2025	3	6	2	0	4	171	181	-10	"	3	11"	33%	3rd
2026	4	6	0	0	6	18	139	-139	5	0	5	0%	4th
Total		58	31	2	25	1,924	1,392	532	Overall Win %: 55%				

Champions
Runners-up
Losing semi-finalist

" Try Bonus points not included.
* 2022 excludes points against UWC Young Guns (Please update if score is found).
* 2019 excludes points against UFS Shimlas Young Guns (Please update if score is found).
- Please note Stats correct as of 17 April 2026.
- Please note the table above only displays the log standings prior to any knockout games (Semi finals & finals).
