= Hugo Kloppers =

South African rugby union player

- Full name: Pieter Hugo Kloppers
- Born: 14 October 1988 (age 38) Worcester, South Africa
- Height: 1.98 m (6 ft 6 in)
- Weight: 111 kg (17 st 7 lb; 245 lb)
- School: Worcester Gymnasium
- University: Stellenbosch University

Rugby union career
- Position: Lock
- Current team: Pumas
Youth career
- 2004–2006: Boland Cavaliers
- 2007–2009: Western Province
Amateur team(s)
Years	Team	Apps	(Points)
2009–2013	Maties	27	(15)
Senior career
Years	Team	Apps	(Points)
2010	Western Province	4	(0)
2013–2014	Golden Lions XV	12	(5)
2013	Golden Lions	4	(0)
2014–2015	Griquas	32	(10)
2016–19	Pumas	56	(5)
- Correct as of 8 July 2019
International career
Years	Team	Apps	(Points)
2012	South Africa Students	2	(5)
- Correct as of 18 May 2014

Pieter Hugo Kloppers (born 14 October 1988) is a South African rugby union player for the Pumas in the Currie Cup and in the Rugby Challenge. His regular position is lock.

== Career ==
=== Youth ===
He represented Boland Cavaliers at the Under-16 Grant Khomo Week in 2004 and at the Under-18 Craven Week in 2006.

He then joined Western Province and played for their Under-19 team in 2007 and their Under-21 team in 2008 and 2009.

=== Varsity Cup ===
He was a regular for the Maties Varsity Cup team, playing for them in their title-winning seasons in 2009 and 2010, as well as in 2011 and 2012.

=== Western Province ===
He was included in the Western Province squad for the 2010 Vodacom Cup competition and made his first class debut in their 28–23 victory over Eastern Province. His first start came a month later when he was selected as the starting lock in their match against SWD Eagles.

=== Lions ===
He joined the Golden Lions side for 2013. He made four appearances for them in the 2013 Vodacom Cup competition, starting in the final against the Pumas, which the Lions won 42–28. He was included in their squad for the 2013 Currie Cup Premier Division and made his Currie Cup debut in their first match of the season, a narrow 29–30 loss to the Free State Cheetahs.

=== Griquas ===
In July 2014, Kloppers was released from his contract with the Golden Lions and he joined Kimberley-based side Griquas prior to the 2014 Currie Cup Premier Division competition, where he made nine appearances.
