= 2020 Varsity Cup =

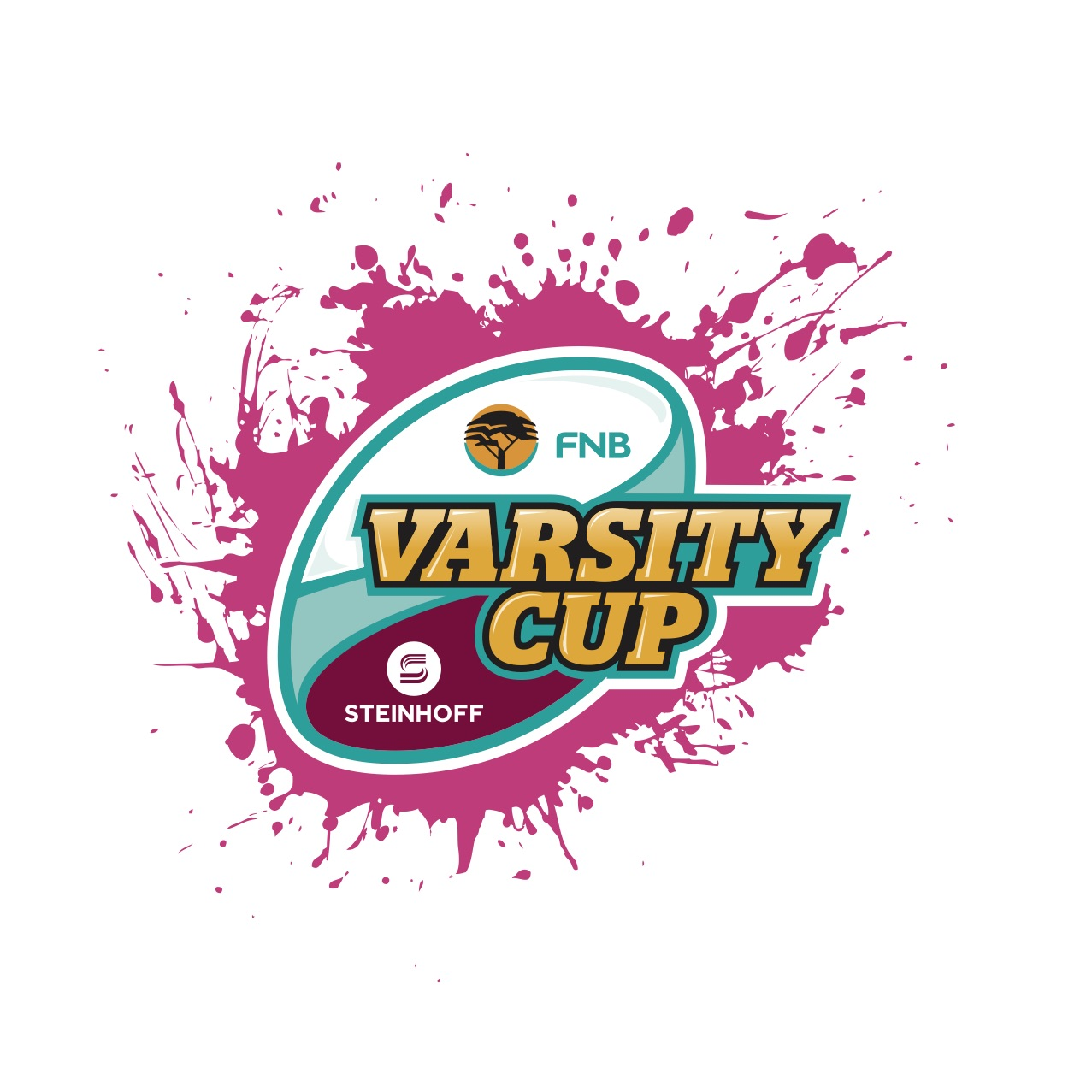
- Countries: South Africa
- Date: 3 February – 9 March 2020
- Champions: N/A (COVID-19)
- Runners-up: N/A (COVID-19)

The 2020 Varsity Cup was the 13th season of the Varsity Cup, the top competition in the annual Varsity Rugby series. It was played between 4 February and 31 May 2021 and featured ten university teams.

The 2020 tournament, which was affected by COVID-19, had its Round 6 clash cancelled.

== Competition rules and information ==
There were nine participating university teams in the 2020 Varsity Cup. They played each other once during the pool stage, either at home or away. Teams received four points for a win and two points for a draw. Bonus points were awarded to teams that scored four or more tries in a game, as well as to teams that lost a match by seven points or less. Teams were ranked by log points, then points difference (points scored less points conceded).

The top four teams after the pool stage qualified for the semifinals, which were followed by a final.

== Teams ==
Location of teams in the 2020 Varsity Cup
Western Cape

The teams that played in the 2020 Varsity Cup are:

2019 Varsity Cup teams
Team name	University	Stadium
CUT Ixias	Central University of Technology	CUT Stadium, Bloemfontein
Maties	Stellenbosch University	Danie Craven Stadium, Stellenbosch
NWU Eagles	North-West University	Fanie du Toit Sport Ground, Potchefstroom
UCT Ikey Tigers	University of Cape Town	UCT Rugby Fields, Cape Town
UFS Shimlas	University of the Free State	Shimla Park, Bloemfontein
UJ	University of Johannesburg	UJ Stadium, Johannesburg
UP Tuks	University of Pretoria	LC de Villiers Stadium, Pretoria
UWC	University of the Western Cape	UWC Sport Stadium, Cape Town
Wits	University of the Witwatersrand	Wits Rugby Stadium, Johannesburg

== Pool stage ==
=== Standings ===
The final log for the 2020 Varsity Cup was:

2020 Varsity Cup log
Pos	Team	P	W	D	L	PF	PA	PD	TF	TA	TB	LB	BP	Pts
1	Maties	5	5	0	0			168					3	23
2	UP Tuks	6	4	0	2			19					6	22
3	Wits	5	4	1	0			40					2	20
4	UCT Ikey Tigers	6	3	2	1			20					4	20
5	NWU Eagles	5	2	0	3			7					5	13
6	CUT Ixias	5	2	1	2			3					3	13
7	UFS Shimlas	6	1	0	5			-90					4	8
8	UWC	5	1	0	4			-141					1	5
9	UJ	5	0	0	5			-21					3	3

Legend and competition rules
Legend:
Qualified for the semifinals.	P = Games played, W = Games won, D = Games drawn, L = Games lost, PF = Points for, PA = Points against, PD = Points difference, TF = Tries for, TA = Tries against, TB = Try bonus points, LB = Losing bonus points, Pts = Log points
Competition rules:
Qualification: The top four teams qualified for the semifinals. Points breakdown: * 4 points for a win * 2 points for a draw * 1 bonus point for a loss by seven points or less * 1 bonus point for scoring four or more tries in a match

=== Matches ===
The following matches were played in the 2020 Varsity Cup:
