= Chris van Zyl =

South African rugby union player

- Full name: Christopher Machiel van Zyl
- Born: 12 July 1986 (age 40) Cape Town, South Africa
- Height: 1.97 m (6 ft 5 1/2 in)
- Weight: 112 kg (17 st 9 lb; 247 lb)
- School: Rondebosch Boys' High School
- University: Stellenbosch University
- Notable relative: Anton van Zyl (brother)

Rugby union career
- Position: Lock
Amateur team(s)
Years	Team	Apps	(Points)
2011	Maties	3	(0)
Senior career
Years	Team	Apps	(Points)
2013–2014	Golden Lions XV	10	(0)
2013–2014	Golden Lions	8	(0)
2015–2021	Western Province	73	(5)
2016–2020	Stormers	42	(5)
- Correct as of 8 April 2021

Christopher Machiel van Zyl (born 12 July 1986 in Cape Town) is a former South African rugby union player for the Stormers in Super Rugby and Western Province in the Currie Cup. His regular position is lock.

== Career ==
=== Amateur ===
He played some Varsity Cup rugby, representing Maties in the 2011 Varsity Cup competition and making three appearances.

He then moved to Johannesburg, where he played amateur rugby for Pirates, also captaining the side.

=== Senior career ===
He joined the Golden Lions senior side in 2013. He made his first class debut in the 2013 Vodacom Cup competition, in a 22–27 defeat to the Falcons in Kempton Park, a match where he was also named captain of the side. He made a further two appearances in the 2013 Vodacom Cup competition.

His Currie Cup debut came in the 2013 Currie Cup Premier Division match against the Sharks in Durban.
