= Wesley Wilkins =

South African rugby union player

- Full name: Wesley Albert Wilkins
- Born: 15 July 1985 (age 41) East London, South Africa
- Height: 1.89 m (6 ft 2 1/2 in)
- Weight: 97 kg (15 st 4 lb; 214 lb)
- School: Selborne College
- University: Stellenbosch University

Rugby union career
- Position: Flanker
Amateur team(s)
Years	Team	Apps	(Points)
2008–2009	Maties	15	(20)
Senior career
Years	Team	Apps	(Points)
2010–2013	Griquas	33	(65)
- Correct as of 1 November 2013
International career
Years	Team	Apps	(Points)
2008–2009	South Africa Students		
- Correct as of 1 November 2013

Wesley Wilkins (born 15 July 1985) is a former South African rugby union footballer, who regularly played as a flanker. He made 33 appearances for Griquas in the domestic Currie Cup and Vodacom Cup competition between 2009 and 2012 and also played for Maties during the 2008 and 2009 Varsity Cup competitions.

Although still contracted to Griquas in 2013, he missed the entire season with a shoulder injury and retired after the 2013 Currie Cup season.
