= Beyers de Villiers =

South African rugby union player (born 1992)

- Full name: Beyers Johannes de Villiers
- Born: 6 January 1992 (age 34) Pretoria, South Africa
- Height: 1.85 m (6 ft 1 in)
- Weight: 100 kg (220 lb; 15 st 10 lb)
- School: Paarl Boys' High School
- University: University of Stellenbosch

Rugby union career
- Position: Flanker
Youth career
- 2010–2012: Western Province
Amateur team(s)
Years	Team	Apps	(Points)
2013–2017	Maties	25	(65)
Senior career
Years	Team	Apps	(Points)
2016	Western Province	7	(10)
- Correct as of 7 February 2017

Beyers Johannes de Villiers (born 6 January 1992) is a former South African rugby union player, who played as a flanker. He played first class rugby for Western Province in 2016 and represented university side Maties in the Varsity Cup between 2013 and 2017. He retired in February 2017 on medical grounds.

== Rugby union career ==
=== Schoolboy and youth rugby union ===
De Villiers was born in Pretoria, but grew up in the Western Cape province, where he attended Paarl Boys' High School. In 2010, De Villiers was selected to represent Western Province at the premier high school rugby union tournament in South Africa, the Under-18 Craven Week. He started in all three of their matches in the tournament held in Welkom, helping his side to two victories to secure a place in the unofficial final, which they lost to Free State.

De Villiers also played for Western Province youth teams after high school. In 2011, he was a key member of the Western Province U19 team that played in the Under-19 Provincial Championship, starting eleven of their thirteen matches during the competition. He helped his team qualify for the semi-finals, by finishing in third place on the Group A log, winning seven of their twelve matches. De Villiers also started in their semi-final match against the Golden Lions U19 team, but his team was eliminated at that stage as the team from Johannesburg won 32–27. In 2012, he progressed to their Under-21 team, starting four matches in the Under-21 Provincial Championship, scoring one try in a 31–20 victory over the Leopards U21s.

=== Varsity Cup and first class rugby ===
At the start of the 2013 season, De Villiers represented university side Maties in the Varsity Cup. He made five appearances in the competition – starting two of those – and scored a try in their match against their Western Cape rivals, the UCT Ikey Tigers. Maties finished top of the log by winning all seven of their matches, qualifying for a home semi-final. De Villiers came on as a replacement in their 16–15 victory over the NMMU Madibaz in the semi-final, as well as in the final, where Maties lost their first match of the season, losing 5–44 to UP Tuks.

De Villiers started their first six matches of the 2014 Varsity Cup, scoring a try in their 33–21 win over NWU Pukke and two tries in a 24–8 win over UJ as Maties finished in third place on the log before losing to UCT Ikey Tigers in the semi-finals.

De Villiers again started six matches in 2015, scoring four tries – two in a 26–all draw against NWU Pukke and one against UJ and NMMU Madibaz – in a disappointing season for Maties, losing out on a semi-final berth by finishing in fourth place on the log.

The 2016 Varsity Cup saw an improvement of their fortunes, and they finished top, winning six of their seven matches during the regular season. De Villiers started five of those matches, scoring tries in matches against CUT Ixias, NMMU Madibaz and NWU Pukke. He also started their semi-final match against UP Tuks and scored two tries in a 49–11 win. However, his side fell just short in the final, losing 6–7 to NWU Pukke.

De Villiers was called up by Western Province for their 2016 Currie Cup qualification series. He made his first class debut on 20 May 2016, coming on as a replacement in a 27–20 victory over the Pumas in Nelspruit in Round Seven of the competition. He started a match for the first time a fortnight later, also scoring his first senior try in a 43–34 victory over the Leopards in Potchefstroom. He made one more start in the competition in a 45–17 victory over the SWD Eagles and scored one more try in their 7–71 victory over Namibian side the Welwitschias to help Western Province to 13 wins in their 14 matches, to finish the competition top of the log. He was also named in their squad for the 2016 Currie Cup Premier Division, but failed to make an appearance in the competition.

De Villiers returned to Maties to play his fifth season in the competition in 2017, but suffered a concussion in the final five minutes of their opening match against UP Tuks and made the decision to retire from the sport.
