= Janco Venter =

Namibian rugby union player

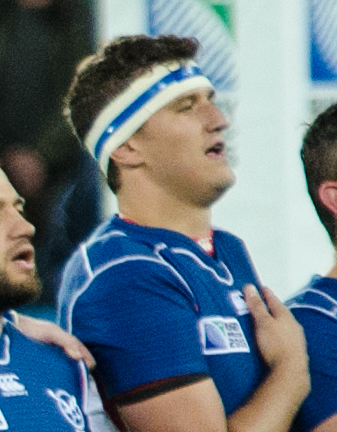
- Born: 19 September 1994 (age 32) Windhoek, Namibia
- Height: 1.94 m (6 ft 4 1/2 in)
- Weight: 107 kg (16 st 12 lb; 236 lb)
- School: Windhoek High School
- University: Stellenbosch University

Rugby union career
- Position: Lock / Flanker
Youth career
- 2010–2012: Namibia
- 2013: Western Province
Amateur team(s)
Years	Team	Apps	(Points)
2015–2016	Maties	13	(0)
Senior career
Years	Team	Apps	(Points)
2015	Welwitschias	1	(0)
2016	Western Province	4	(5)
2018–2020	Jersey Reds	35	(15)
2020–2022	Saracens	7	(5)
2023–	Griquas		
- Correct as of 7 July 2016
International career
Years	Team	Apps	(Points)
2013–	Namibia	25	(31)
- Correct as of 14 September 2019

Janco Venter (born 19 September 1994) is a Namibian rugby union player. He plays at lock or flanker for Saracens and has represented Namibia at International level. He was named in Namibia's squad for the 2015 Rugby World Cup.

On 19 March 2018, it was announced Venter had signed for Jersey Reds, in the RFU Championship. He left Jersey in July 2020 to join Saracens from the 2020–21 season.
