= Ali Vermaak =

South African rugby union player

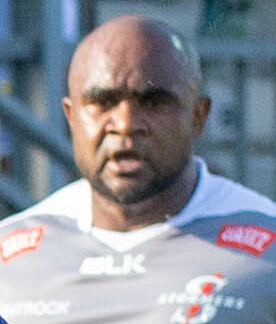
- Full name: Alistair Fernando Vermaak
- Born: 28 April 1989 (age 37) Port Elizabeth, South Africa
- Height: 1.79 m (5 ft 10 1/2 in)
- Weight: 110 kg (240 lb; 17 st 5 lb)
- School: Hillside High School, Port Elizabeth; Hentie Cilliers High School, Virginia

Rugby union career
- Position: Prop
- Current team: Stormers / Western Province
Youth career
- 2005: Eastern Province
- 2006–2007: Griffons
- 2008–2010: Western Province
Amateur team(s)
Years	Team	Apps	(Points)
2011–2013	Maties	22	(0)
Senior career
Years	Team	Apps	(Points)
2011–2026	Western Province	92	(10)
2013	→ Boland Cavaliers	3	(0)
2014–2026	Stormers	91	(5)
2026 - present	Boland Cavaliers	1	(0)
- Correct as of 23 July 2022
International career
Years	Team	Apps	(Points)
2013	South African Universities	1	(0)
- Correct as of 18 April 2018

Alistair Fernando Vermaak (born 28 April 1989) is a South African professional rugby union player for the Stormers in Super Rugby and Western Province in the Currie Cup and in the Rugby Challenge. His regular position is prop.

== Career ==
=== Youth ===
At youth level, Vermaak played for Eastern Province at the 2005 Under-16 Grant Khomo Week and for Griffons at the Under-18 Academy Week in 2006, as well as the 2007 Craven Week. He also played for Griffons U19 in the 2007 Under-19 Provincial Championship competition.

In 2008, Vermaak moved to Cape Town to join Western Province. He played for them in the 2008 Under-19 Provincial Championship and 2010 Under-21 Provincial Championship competitions.

=== Western Province / Stormers ===
In 2011, Vermaak was included in the Western Province squad for the 2011 Vodacom Cup competition and made his first class debut in that competition, coming on as a substitute in their match against the Welwitschias and promptly scored a try within a minute of coming on. He made five appearances in total in the competition. One more appearance followed in the 2012 Vodacom Cup competition.

Vermaak's Currie Cup debut came in 2013, when he was included in the Western Province team to face the Blue Bulls in the opening match of the 2013 Currie Cup Premier Division season.

After further appearances in the 2014 Vodacom Cup, Vermaak was included in the Stormers squad and named on the bench for their 2014 Super Rugby clash with the Bulls in Pretoria.

=== Boland Cavaliers ===
Vermaak had a short loan spell at the Boland Cavaliers during the 2013 Vodacom Cup competition, making three appearances in total.

=== Varsity Cup ===
Vermaak also represented the Maties in the Varsity Cup competition in 2011, 2012 and 2013.
