= Jaco Nepgen =

South African rugby union player

- Born: 3 January 1986 (age 40) Queenstown, South Africa
- Height: 1.98 m (6 ft 6 in)
- Weight: 110 kg (17 st 5 lb; 243 lb)
- School: Hangklip High School
- University: Stellenbosch University

Rugby union career
- Position: Lock / flanker
Youth career
- 2002–2004: Border Bulldogs
- 2005–2007: Western Province
Amateur team(s)
Years	Team	Apps	(Points)
2008–2009	Maties	15	(15)
Senior career
Years	Team	Apps	(Points)
2010–2016	Griquas	89	(40)
2011	→ SWD Eagles	1	(0)
2010–2016	Total	90	(40)
- Correct as of 12 October 2015

Jaco Nepgen (born 3 January 1986) is a former South African rugby union footballer that played as either lock or flank. He represented Griquas in the Currie Cup and Vodacom Cup competitions between 2010 and 2016, played a single match for the SWD Eagles in the Currie Cup and won back-to-back titles with Maties in the Varsity Cup in 2008 and 2009. He also represented South Africa Universities in 2008 and 2009. In 2009 Nepgen was named Rugby Player of the year for Maties

He retired in July 2016 following doctor's advice, having made 90 first class appearances.

== Youth rugby ==
He started his playing career at Hoërskool Hangklip where he was chosen for the school's first XV at the age of 16 and later captained the team in his final year. Schoolboy honours include Border under-16 (2002) and two years (2003 and 2004) representing the Border Under-18 Craven Week squad.

He also represented his school's first XI cricket team from the age of 15 and received Border Country District provincial honours in cricket at under-15 and under-19 levels in 2001, 2002 and 2003.

== Coaching ==
In 2020 Nepgen was appointed as Deputy Principal - Sports Development at Nico Malan Highschool in Humansdorp, South Africa
