= Kobus van Dyk =

South African rugby union player

- Full name: Jacobus Johannes van Dyk
- Born: 6 July 1994 (age 32) Bredasdorp, South Africa
- Height: 1.96 m (6 ft 5 in)
- Weight: 108 kg (238 lb; 17 st 0 lb)
- School: Hoërskool Overberg, Caledon
- University: Stellenbosch University

Rugby union career
- Position: No 8 / Lock / Flanker
Youth career
- 2014–2015: Western Province U21
Amateur team(s)
| Years | Team | Apps | (Points) |
| 2015–2017 | Maties | 14 | (40) |
Senior career
| Years | Team | Apps | (Points) |
| 2016–2018 | Western Province | 36 | (25) |
| 2016–2019 | Stormers | 29 | (10) |
| 2020–2024 | Canon Eagles | 58 | (80) |
- Correct as of 20 February 2021

Jacobus Johannes van Dyk (born 6 July 1994) is a South African rugby union player for the Stormers in Super Rugby. His regular playing positions are number 8, lock or flanker.

== Rugby union career ==
=== Youth and Varsity Cup rugby union ===
Van Dyk was born in Bredasdorp and attended school in Caledon. He never represented his local provincial side Western Province at schoolboy tournaments, such as the Craven Week. However, after enrolling at the Stellenbosch University, he was selected to represent Western Province at Under-21 level, making three appearances for them in the 2014 Under-21 Provincial Championship.

Van Dyk played six matches for Maties in the 2015 Varsity Cup competition, scoring tries in matches against UCT Ikey Tigers, NWU Pukke, NMMU Madibaz and CUT Ixias. He made seven starts for Western Province U21 during the 2015 Under-21 Provincial Championship regular season, before dropping to the bench for the title play-offs; he came on as a first-half replacement in their 43–20 victory over the Golden Lions U21s in the semi-finals, but remained unused in the final, in which his side beat the Free State U21s 52–17.

Van Dyk started eight of Maties' nine matches during the 2016 Varsity Cup, repeating his scoring records from 2015 by scoring four tries; two of those came in their 40–0 victory over CUT Ixias, and one each against UCT Ikey Tigers and UFS Shimlas.

=== Western Province ===
Shortly after the 2016 Varsity Cup, Van Dyk was also included in the Western Province squad for their 2016 Currie Cup qualification series. He made his first class debut in a 16–24 defeat to a Sharks XV and established himself as the first choice number eight for the duration of the tournament, making nine appearances.

Just over two months after making his first class debut, Van Dyk was called into the Stormers squad for their final match of the 2016 Super Rugby regular season against the Southern Kings and made his Super Rugby debut by coming on as a replacement for the final ten minutes of the match.
