= Wilhelm van der Sluys =

- Born: 14 August 1991 (age 35) Paarl
- Height: 1.98 m (6 ft 6 in)
- Weight: 115 kg (254 lb; 18 st 2 lb)
- School: Paarl Boys' High School
- University: University of Stellenbosch

Rugby union career
- Position: Lock
- Current team: Lions / Golden Lions
Youth career
- 2009–2012: Western Province
Amateur team(s)
Years	Team	Apps	(Points)
2013–2016	Maties	29	(0)
Senior career
Years	Team	Apps	(Points)
2012–2015	Western Province	25	(0)
2016–2017	Worcester Warriors	1	(0)
2016	→ Rotherham Titans	2	(0)
2016	→ London Scottish	3	(0)
2017	→ Southern Kings	11	(0)
2017–2019	Exeter Chiefs	12	(0)
2019–2021	Lions	15	(0)
2019	Golden Lions XV	2	(0)
2019–2021	Golden Lions	12	(0)
- Correct as of 16 October 2021

Wilhelm van der Sluys is a South African rugby union player for the Lions in Super Rugby, the Golden Lions in the Currie Cup and the Golden Lions XV in the Rugby Challenge. His usual position is lock.

He came through the Western Province youth system and played for them at various youth levels.

He played for Maties Rugby Club (Stellenbosch University) for seven years. He represented Maties in the Varsity Cup and Western Province Super league.

He made his first team debut for Western Province during the 2012 Vodacom Cup, coming on as a substitute in their game against Pampas XV. He made a total of six appearances in that campaign, including in the final win against Griquas.

He was then also included in the squad for the 2012 Currie Cup Premier Division.

On 26 July 2017, Van der Sluys signed a one-year contract with English Premiership side Exeter Chiefs ahead of the 2017–18 season.
