= Jan de Klerk (rugby union) =

South African rugby union player

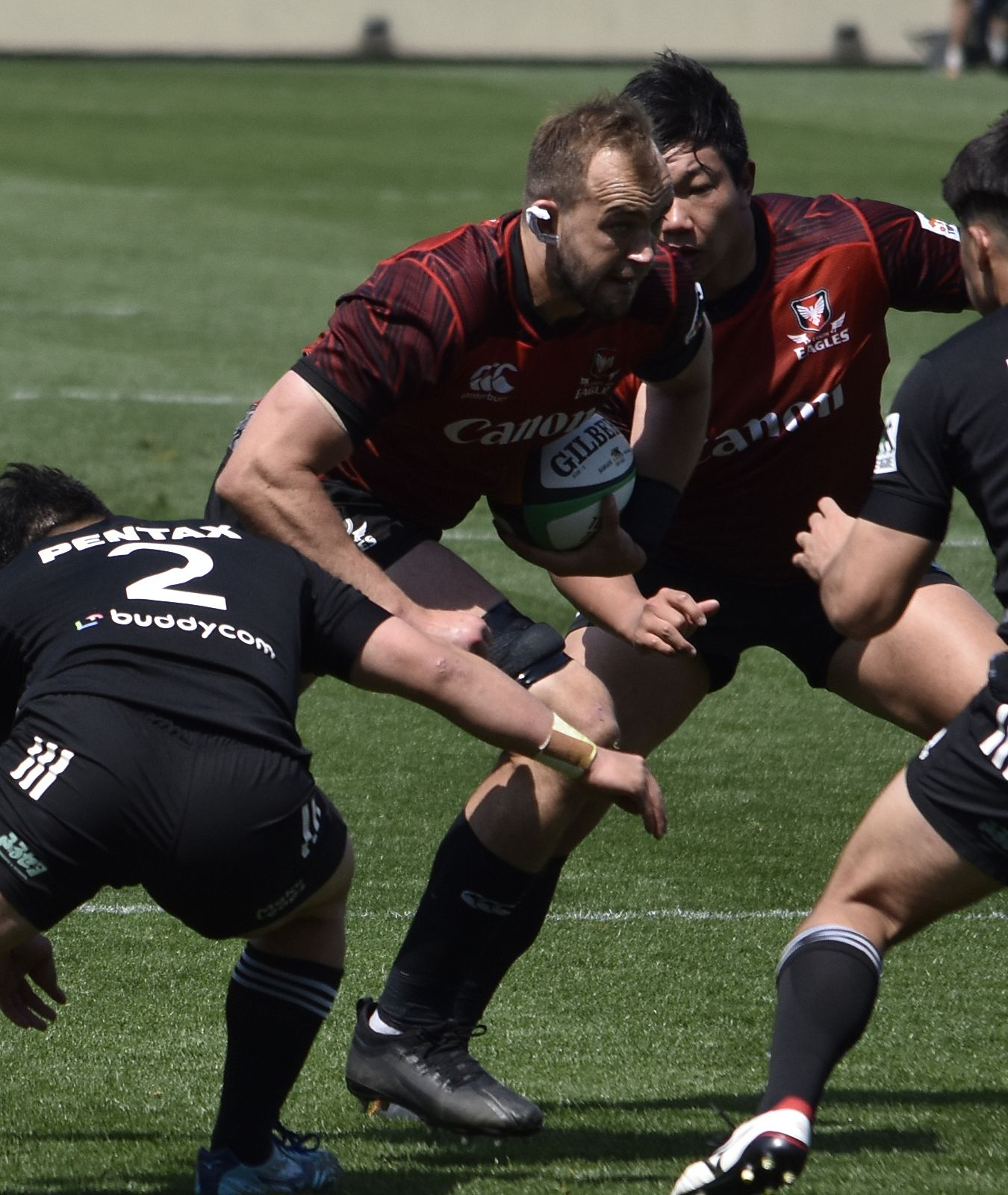
- De Klerk in 2021
- Full name: Johannes Cornelis de Klerk
- Born: 10 February 1991 (age 35) Pietersburg, South Africa
- Height: 1.98 m (6 ft 6 in)
- Weight: 113 kg (17 st 11 lb; 249 lb)
- University: Pietersburg Hoërskool / Hoërskool Waterkloof, Pretoria

Rugby union career
- Position: Lock
Youth career
- 2007: Limpopo Blue Bulls
- 2012: Western Province
Amateur team(s)
Years	Team	Apps	(Points)
2013–2014	Maties	15	(10)
Senior career
Years	Team	Apps	(Points)
2014–2017	Western Province	30	(15)
2015–2018	Stormers	21	(5)
2018–2021	Canon Eagles	24	(0)
2022	Toyota Industries Corporation Shuttles	0	(0)
- Correct as of 20 February 2020

Johannes Cornelis de Klerk (born 10 February 1991) is a South African professional rugby union player for Canon Eagles in the Japanese Top League. His regular position is lock.

== Career ==
=== Youth ===
De Klerk grew up in Pietersburg (now Polokwane) and was selected to represent Limpopo at the Under-16 Grant Khomo Week in 2007.

After high school, De Klerk moved to the Western Cape and was linked up with Cape Town-based side Western Province. He made nine appearances for the Western Province U21 side during the 2012 Under-21 Provincial Championship, helping the side to third spot on the log to qualify for the semi-finals. He started their 19–18 victory over the Sharks U21s in the semi-final, as well as in the final, where he could not prevent his side suffering a 13–22 defeat to the Blue Bulls U21 in Durban.

=== Maties ===
De Klerk was included in the Maties squad for the 2013 Varsity Cup competition. He helped them to finish top of the log and beat the NMMU Madibaz 16–15 in the semi-final, but once again lost in a final, this time 5–44 to UP Tuks.

De Klerk returned to Varsity Cup action in 2014, starting all eight of their matches during the season and scoring a try in each of their matches against Johannesburg-based rivals – one in an 18–15 win over Wits and one in a 24–8 win over UJ. Maties finished third in the competition to qualify for the semi-finals, but were unable to beat their Cape Town rivals UCT Ikey Tigers, losing the match 8–20.

=== Western Province / Stormers ===
Shortly after the conclusion of the 2014 Varsity Cup, De Klerk joined the Western Province squad for the 2014 Vodacom Cup. He made his first class debut by starting in their 65–29 victory over Kenyan invitational side, Simba XV. He also started their final two matches of the regular season, a 28–15 win over a Free State XV and a 14–23 loss to the SWD Eagles in George, as Western Province finished in fourth spot in the Southern Section to qualify for the quarter finals. De Klerk also started in their 8–13 defeat to the Pumas in Nelspruit in the quarter final.

In 2015, he featured prominently for the Vodacom Cup side. He didn't feature in their opening match of the season against the Boland Cavaliers, but played in the remaining nine matches of the campaign, starting seven of those. He scored his first senior try in their Round Four match against the Border Bulldogs in a 34–6 win and helped Western Province top the Southern Section log with seven wins out of seven. He played in their 47–22 victory over the Leopards in the quarter final, their 10–6 win over the Blue Bulls in the semi-final and also started the final, where he could not prevent the Pumas win the match 24–7 to win the competition for the first time in their history.

De Klerk was named on the bench for the Stormers' final match of the round-robin stage of the 2015 Super Rugby season against the Sharks in Durban.

=== Canon Eagles ===
De Klerk joined Japanese Top League side Canon Eagles prior to the 2018–19 Top League.
