= Donald Stevens =

Canadian retired skier (born 1963)

Personal information
- Born: 22 September 1963 (age 62) Rossland, BC, Canada
- Height: 1.85 m (6 ft 1 in)

Skiing career
- Sport: Alpine skiing
- Club: Red Mountain Racers Ski Club
- Retired: 1990
- Disciplines: Downhill

World Cup
- Podiums: 2

Donald "Don" Stevens (born 22 September 1963) is a Canadian former alpine skier who competed in the 1988 Winter Olympics. He was born in Rossland, British Columbia and was a member of the Red Mountain Racers.

Stevens had 2 podium finishes in the 1987–88 FIS World Cup Season, a 2nd place in the Beaver Creek downhill on March 12, 1988, and 3rd place finish in Åre, Sweden. However, the race in Åre was canceled due to strong winds, resulting in a re-run where he finished 9th.
