= Craig Barry =

South African rugby union player

- Born: 30 April 1992 (age 34) Cape Town, South Africa
- Height: 1.82 m (5 ft 11 1/2 in)
- Weight: 90 kg (200 lb; 14 st 2 lb)
- School: Paul Roos Gymnasium

Rugby union career
- Position: Fullback / Winger
Youth career
- 2005–2013: Western Province
Senior career
| Years | Team | Apps | (Points) |
| 2017–2019 | Western Province | 25 | (85) |
| 2017–2018 | Cheetahs | 9 | (20) |
| 2018–2019 | Stormers | 10 | (5) |
| 2019–2022 | Cheetahs | 4 | (0) |
| 2020–2022 | Free State Cheetahs | 4 | (15) |
- Correct as of 13 March 2023

Craig Barry (born 30 April 1992) is a South African rugby union player for the Cheetahs in the Pro14. His regular position is fullback and wing.
