= 2017 Varsity Rugby =

2017 Varsity Rugby was the 2017 edition of four rugby union competitions annually played between several university teams in South Africa. It was contested from 30 January to 17 April 2017 and was the tenth edition of these competitions.

== Varsity Cup ==
The following teams competed in the 2017 Varsity Cup: CUT Ixias, Maties, NMMU Madibaz, NWU Pukke, UCT Ikey Tigers, UFS Shimlas, UJ, UP Tuks and Wits. Wits were promoted from the 2016 Varsity Shield to return to the Varsity Shield competition after a two-year absence.

== Varsity Shield ==
The following teams competed in the 2017 Varsity Shield: CPUT, Rhodes, TUT Vikings, UFH Blues, UKZN Impi, UWC and WSU All Blacks.

== Young Guns ==
=== Competition rules ===
There was nine participating universities in the 2017 Young Guns competition, the Under-20 sides of each of the nine Varsity Cup teams. These teams were divided into three regionalised pools and each team played every team in their pool twice over the course of the season, once at home and once away.

Teams received four points for a win and two points for a draw. Bonus points were awarded to teams that scored four or more tries in a game, as well as to teams that lost a match by eight points or less. Teams were ranked by log points, then points difference (points scored less points conceded).

The top four teams overall qualified for the title play-off semi-finals.

=== Teams ===
2017 Young Guns teams
Team	University	Stadium
CUT Young Guns	Central Institute of Technology	CUT Stadium, Bloemfontein
Maties Juniors	Stellenbosch University	Danie Craven Stadium, Stellenbosch
NMMU Young Guns	Nelson Mandela Metropolitan University	NMMU Stadium, Port Elizabeth
NWU Pukke Young Guns	North-West University	Fanie du Toit Sport Ground, Potchefstroom
UCT Trojans	University of Cape Town	UCT Rugby Fields, Cape Town
UFS Shimlas Young Guns	University of the Free State	Shimla Park, Bloemfontein
UJ Young Guns	University of Johannesburg	UJ Stadium, Johannesburg
UP Tuks Young Guns	University of Pretoria	LC de Villiers Stadium, Pretoria
Wits Young Guns	University of the Witwatersrand	Wits Rugby Stadium, Johannesburg

=== Standings ===
The final standings for the 2017 Varsity Cup Young Guns were:

2017 Varsity Cup Young Guns : North log
Pos	Team	Pl	W	D	L	PF	PA	PD	TB	LB	Pts
1	UP Tuks Young Guns	1	1	0	0	47	0	+47	1	0	5
2	UJ Young Guns	0	0	0	0	0	0	0	0	0	0
3	Wits Young Guns	1	0	0	1	0	47	−47	0	0	0
2017 Varsity Cup Young Guns : Central log
Pos	Team	Pl	W	D	L	PF	PA	PD	TB	LB	Pts
1	UFS Shimlas Young Guns	1	1	0	0	38	17	+21	1	0	5
2	CUT Young Guns	0	0	0	0	0	0	0	0	0	0
3	NWU Pukke Young Guns	0	0	0	0	0	0	0	0	0	0
2017 Varsity Cup Young Guns : South log
Pos	Team	Pl	W	D	L	PF	PA	PD	TB	LB	Pts
1	Maties Juniors	1	1	0	0	44	13	+31	1	0	5
2	NMMU Young Guns	0	0	0	0	0	0	0	0	0	0
3	UCT Trojans	1	0	0	1	13	44	−31	0	0	0
* Legend: Pos = Position, Pl = Played, W = Won, D = Drawn, L = Lost, PF = Points for, PA = Points against, PD = Points difference, TF = Tries for, TA = Tries against, TB = Try bonus points, LB = Losing bonus points, Pts = Log points The top four teams qualified to the semi-final. Points breakdown: *4 points for a win *2 points for a draw *1 bonus point for a loss by eight points or less *1 bonus point for scoring four or more tries in a match

=== Matches ===
The following matches were played in the 2017 Varsity Young Guns competition:

==== Round one ====
6 February 2017	NWU Pukke Young Guns	17–38	UFS Shimlas Young Guns	Fanie du Toit Sport Ground, Potchefstroom
16:15

Bye/s: CUT Young Guns, Maties Juniors, NMMU Young Guns, UCT Trojans, UJ Young Guns, UP Tuks Young Guns, Wits Young Guns

==== Round two ====
13 February 2017	Maties Juniors	44–13	UCT Trojans	Danie Craven Stadium, Stellenbosch
14:15

13 February 2017	Wits Young Guns	0–47	UP Tuks Young Guns	Wits Rugby Stadium, Johannesburg
14:15

Bye/s: CUT Young Guns, NMMU Young Guns, NWU Pukke Young Guns, UFS Shimlas Young Guns, UJ Young Guns

==== Round three ====
20 February 2017	CUT Young Guns	v	UFS Shimlas Young Guns	CUT Stadium, Bloemfontein
14:15

20 February 2017	Maties Juniors	v	NMMU Young Guns	Danie Craven Stadium, Stellenbosch
14:15

20 February 2017	UJ Young Guns	v	UP Tuks Young Guns	UJ Stadium, Johannesburg
16:15

Bye/s: NWU Pukke Young Guns, UCT Trojans, Wits Young Guns

==== Round four ====
27 February 2017	UCT Trojans	v	Maties Juniors	UCT Rugby Fields, Cape Town
14:15

27 February 2017	UFS Shimlas Young Guns	v	NWU Pukke Young Guns	Shimla Park, Bloemfontein
14:15

27 February 2017	UP Tuks Young Guns	v	Wits Young Guns	LC de Villiers Stadium, Pretoria
14:15

Bye/s: CUT Young Guns, NMMU Young Guns, UJ Young Guns

==== Round five ====
6 March 2017	NMMU Young Guns	v	UCT Trojans	NMMU Stadium, Port Elizabeth
14:15

6 March 2017	UFS Shimlas Young Guns	v	CUT Young Guns	Shimla Park, Bloemfontein
14:15

6 March 2017	UP Tuks Young Guns	v	UJ Young Guns	LC de Villiers Stadium, Pretoria
14:15

Bye/s: Maties Juniors, NWU Pukke Young Guns, Wits Young Guns

==== Round six ====
13 March 2017	UCT Trojans	v	NMMU Young Guns	UCT Rugby Fields, Cape Town
14:15

13 March 2017	Wits Young Guns	v	UJ Young Guns	Wits Rugby Stadium, Johannesburg
14:15

13 March 2017	CUT Young Guns	v	NWU Pukke Young Guns	CUT Stadium, Bloemfontein
14:15

Bye/s: Maties Juniors, UFS Shimlas Young Guns, UP Tuks Young Guns

==== Round seven ====
20 March 2017	NWU Pukke Young Guns	v	CUT Young Guns	Fanie du Toit Sport Ground, Potchefstroom
14:15

20 March 2017	NMMU Young Guns	v	Maties Juniors	NMMU Stadium, Port Elizabeth
14:15

20 March 2017	UJ Young Guns	v	Wits Young Guns	UJ Stadium, Johannesburg
14:15

Bye/s: UCT Trojans, UFS Shimlas Young Guns, UP Tuks Young Guns

==== Semi-finals ====
27 March 2017	Team 1	v	Team 4
16:15

27 March 2017	Team 2	v	Team 3
16:15

==== Final ====
10 April 2017	Semi-final winner 1	v	Semi-final winner 2
19:00

== Koshuis Rugby Championship ==
=== Competition rules ===
There was nine participating teams in the 2017 Steinhoff Koshuis Rugby Championship competition, the winners of the internal leagues of each of the nine Varsity Cup teams. These teams were divided into two pools (one with five teams and one with four teams) and each team played every team in their pool once over the course of the season, either at home or away.

Teams received four points for a win and two points for a draw. Bonus points were awarded to teams that scored four or more tries in a game, as well as to teams that lost a match by eight points or less. Teams were ranked by log points, then points difference (points scored less points conceded).

Three teams qualified for the title play-offs.

=== Teams ===
2017 Steinhoff Koshuis Rugby Championship
Team	University	Stadium
Steinhoff Chiropractors (UJ)	University of Johannesburg	UJ Stadium
Steinhoff Cobras (UCT)	University of Cape Town	UCT Rugby Fields
Steinhoff Harlequins (Madibaz)	Nelson Mandela Metropolitan University	Madibaz Stadium
Steinhoff Helderberg (Maties)	Stellenbosch University	Danie Craven Stadium
Steinhoff Patria (Pukke)	North-West University	Fanie du Toit Sport Grounds
Steinhoff Rhinos (CUT)	Central Institute of Technology	CUT Rugby Stadium
Steinhoff Sonop (Tuks)	University of Pretoria	Tuks Rugby Stadium
Steinhoff Titans (Wits)	University of the Witwatersrand	Wits Rugby Stadium
Steinhoff Vishuis (Shimlas)	University of the Free State	Xerox Shimla Park

=== Standings ===
The final standings for the 2017 Steinhoff Koshuis Rugby Championship were:

Steinhoff Koshuis Championship (Koshuis 1) 2017 Log
Pos	Team	Pl	W	D	L	PD	BP	Pts
1	Steinhoff Vishuis (Shimlas)	4	3	0	1	158	4	16
2	Steinhoff Patria (Pukke)	4	3	0	1	64	3	15
3	Steinhoff Sonop (Tuks)	4	2	0	2	-7	2	10
4	Steinhoff Helderberg (Maties)	4	2	0	2	-31	2	10
5	Steinhoff Rhinos (CUT)	4	0	0	4	-184	2	2
Steinhoff Koshuis Premiership (Koshuis 2) 2017 Log
Pos	Team	Pl	W	D	L	PD	BP	Pts
1	Steinhoff Cobras (UCT)	3	3	0	0	47	1	13
2	Steinhoff Harlequins (Madibaz)	3	2	0	1	13	0	8
3	Steinhoff Titans Wits)	3	1	0	2	0	1	5
4	Steinhoff Chiropractors (UJ)	3	0	0	3	-60	0	0
* Legend: Pos = Position, Pl = Played, W = Won, D = Drawn, L = Lost, PD = Points Difference, BP = Bonus points, Pts = Log points Three teams qualified to the play-offs. Points breakdown: *4 points for a win *2 points for a draw *1 bonus point for a loss by eight points or less *1 bonus point for scoring four or more tries in a match

=== Matches ===
The following matches were played in the 2017 Steinhoff Koshuis Rugby Championship competition:

==== Round one ====
13 February 2017	Steinhoff Helderberg (Maties)	18–29	Steinhoff Patria (Pukke)	Danie Craven Stadium
16:15		Report

Bye/s: Steinhoff Chiropractors (UJ), Steinhoff Cobras (UCT), Steinhoff Harlequins (Madibaz), Steinhoff Rhinos (CUT), Steinhoff Sonop (Tuks), Steinhoff Titans (Wits), Steinhoff Vishuis (Shimlas)

==== Round two ====
20 February 2017	Steinhoff Patria (Pukke)	45 - 0	Steinhoff Rhinos (CUT)	Fanie du Toit Sport Grounds
16:15

20 February 2017	Steinhoff Helderberg (Maties)	5 - 57	Steinhoff Vishuis (Shimlas)	Danie Craven Stadium
16:15

Bye/s: Steinhoff Chiropractors (UJ), Steinhoff Cobras (UCT), Steinhoff Harlequins (Madibaz), Steinhoff Sonop (Tuks), Steinhoff Titans (Wits)

==== Round three ====
27 February 2017	Steinhoff Sonop (Tuks)	24 - 34	Steinhoff Helderberg (Maties)	Tuks Rugby Stadium
16:15

27 February 2017	Steinhoff Vishuis (Shimlas)	34 - 16	Steinhoff Patria (Pukke)	Xerox Shimla Park
16:15

27 February 2017	Steinhoff Cobras (UCT)	21 - 5	Steinhoff Titans (Wits)	UCT Rugby Fields
19:00

Bye/s: Steinhoff Chiropractors (UJ), Steinhoff Harlequins (Madibaz), Steinhoff Rhinos (CUT)

==== Round four ====
6 March 2017	Steinhoff Vishuis (Shimlas)	95 - 5	Steinhoff Rhinos (CUT)	Xerox Shimla Park
16:15

6 March 2017	Steinhoff Patria (Pukke)	47 - 21	Steinhoff Sonop (Tuks)	Fanie du Toit Sport Ground
16:15

6 March 2017	Steinhoff Harlequins (Madibaz)	18 - 8	Steinhoff Chiropractors (UJ)	Madibaz Stadium
16:15

Bye/s: Steinhoff Cobras (UCT), Steinhoff Helderberg (Maties), Steinhoff Titans (Wits)

==== Round five ====
13 March 2017	Steinhoff Rhinos (CUT)	23 - 50	Steinhoff Sonop (Tuks)	CUT Rugby Stadium
16:15

13 March 2017	Steinhoff Titans (Wits)	2 - 18	Steinhoff Harlequins (Madibaz)	Wits Rugby Stadium
16:15

13 March 2017	Steinhoff Cobras (UCT)	28 - 10	Steinhoff Chiropractors (UJ)	UCT Rugby Fields
19:00

Bye/s: Steinhoff Helderberg (Maties), Steinhoff Patria (Pukke), Steinhoff Vishuis (Shimlas)

==== Round six ====
20 March 2017	Steinhoff Harlequins (Madibaz)	0 -13	Steinhoff Cobras (UCT)	Madibaz Stadium
16:15

20 March 2017	Steinhoff Rhinos (CUT)	31 - 53	Steinhoff Helderberg (Maties)	CUT Rugby Stadium
16:15

20 March 2017	Steinhoff Sonop (Tuks)	23 - 21	Steinhoff Vishuis (Shimlas)	Tuks Rugby Stadium
16:15

20 March 2017	Steinhoff Chiropractors (UJ)	0 - 32	Steinhoff Titans (Wits)	UJ Stadium
19:00

Bye/s: Steinhoff Patria (Pukke)

==== Round seven ====
27 March 2017	Steinhoff Cobras (UCT)	39 - 13	Steinhoff Harlequins (Madibaz)	UCT Rugby Fields
17:00

Bye/s: Steinhoff Chiropractors (UJ), Steinhoff Patria (Pukke), Steinhoff Helderberg (Maties), Steinhoff Rhinos (CUT), Steinhoff Sonop (Tuks), Steinhoff Titans (Wits), Steinhoff Vishuis (Shimlas)

==== Final ====
17 April 2017	Steinhoff Vishuis (Shimlas)	25 - 10	Steinhoff Patria (Pukke)	Tuks Rugby Stadium
16:45

== See also ==
- Varsity Cup
- 2017 Varsity Cup
- 2017 Varsity Shield
- 2017 Gold Cup
