= 2013 Varsity Rugby =

The 2013 Varsity Cup was contested from 4 February to 8 April 2013. The tournament (also known as the FNB Varsity Cup presented by Steinhoff International for sponsorship reasons) was the sixth season of the Varsity Cup, an annual inter-university rugby union competition featuring eight South African universities.

The tournament was won by UP Tuks for the second consecutive season; they beat Maties 44–5 in the final played on 8 April 2013. No team was relegated to the second-tier Varsity Shield competition for 2014.

== Scoring ==
All four 2013 Varsity Rugby competitions will use a different scoring system to the regular system. Tries will be worth five points as usual, but conversions will be worth three points, while penalties and drop goals will only be worth two points.

== Varsity Cup ==
The following teams competed in the 2013 Varsity Cup: Maties, NMMU Madibaz, NWU Pukke, UCT Ikey Tigers, UFS Shimlas, UJ, UP Tuks and Wits, who took part in this competition for the first time following their promotion from the 2012 Varsity Shield. The tournament was won by UP Tuks, who beat Maties 44–5 in the final. There was no relegation at the end of 2013.

== Varsity Shield ==
The following teams competed in the 2015 Varsity Shield: CUT Ixias, UFH Blues, UKZN Impi, UWC and TUT Vikings, who have been relegated from the 2012 Varsity Cup. The tournament was won by CUT Ixias, who beat UWC 29–19 in the final. There was no promotion at the end of 2013.

== Promotion/Relegation ==
There was no promotion or relegation at the end of 2013.

== Young Guns ==
=== Competition Rules ===
There were eight participating universities in the 2013 Young Guns competition. These teams were divided into two pools (the FNB pool and the Steinhoff pool) and played the other teams in the pool once over the course of the season, either home or away.

Teams received four points for a win and two points for a draw. Bonus points were awarded to teams that scored four or more tries in a game, as well as to teams that lost a match by seven points or less. Teams were ranked by log points, then points difference (points scored less points conceded).

The top two teams in each pool qualified for the title play-offs. In the semi-finals, the teams that finished first had home advantage against the teams that finished second in their respective pools. The winners of these semi-finals played each other in the final.

=== Participating teams ===
Young Guns
| Team Name | Sponsored Name | University | Stadium |
| Maties Juniors | Steinhoff Maties Juniors | Stellenbosch University | Danie Craven Stadium, Stellenbosch |
| NMMU Young Guns | FNB NMMU Young Guns | Nelson Mandela Metropolitan University | NMMU Stadium, Port Elizabeth |
| NWU Pukke Young Guns | FNB NWU Pukke Young Guns | North-West University | Fanie du Toit Sport Ground, Potchefstroom |
| UCT Trojans | FNB UCT Trojans | University of Cape Town | UCT Rugby Fields, Cape Town |
| UFS Shimlas Young Guns | FNB UFS Shimlas Young Guns | University of the Free State | Shimla Park, Bloemfontein |
| UJ Young Guns | FNB UJ Young Guns | University of Johannesburg | UJ Stadium, Johannesburg |
| UP Tuks Young Guns | FNB UP Tuks Young Guns | University of Pretoria | LC de Villiers Stadium, Pretoria |
| Wits Young Guns | FNB Wits Young Guns | University of the Witwatersrand | Wits Rugby Stadium, Johannesburg |

=== Standings ===
2013 Young Guns Steinhoff Pool Log
| | Team | Played | Won | Drawn | Lost | Points For | Points Against | Points Difference | Tries For | Tries Against | Try Bonus | Losing Bonus | Points |
| 1 | UP Tuks Young Guns | 3 | 3 | 0 | 0 | 205 | 24 | +181 | 29 | 2 | 2 | 0 | 14 |
| 2 | UFS Shimlas Young Guns | 3 | 2 | 0 | 1 | 113 | 51 | +62 | 15 | 8 | 2 | 1 | 11 |
| 3 | NWU Pukke Young Guns | 3 | 1 | 0 | 2 | 101 | 115 | –14 | 15 | 17 | 2 | 1 | 7 |
| 4 | Wits Young Guns | 3 | 0 | 0 | 3 | 10 | 239 | –229 | 1 | 33 | 0 | 0 | 0 |
2013 Young Guns FNB Pool Log
| | Team | Played | Won | Drawn | Lost | Points For | Points Against | Points Difference | Tries For | Tries Against | Try Bonus | Losing Bonus | Points |
| 1 | Maties Juniors | 3 | 3 | 0 | 0 | 123 | 42 | +81 | 17 | 5 | 3 | 0 | 15 |
| 2 | UCT Trojans | 3 | 2 | 0 | 1 | 101 | 96 | +5 | 16 | 13 | 2 | 0 | 10 |
| 3 | UJ Young Guns | 3 | 1 | 0 | 2 | 72 | 114 | –42 | 11 | 18 | 2 | 1 | 7 |
| 4 | NMMU Young Guns | 3 | 0 | 0 | 3 | 68 | 112 | –44 | 9 | 17 | 1 | 1 | 2 |
The top 2 teams in each pool will qualify for the semi-finals. Points breakdown: *4 points for a win *2 points for a draw *1 bonus point for a loss by seven points or less *1 bonus point for scoring four or more tries in a match

=== Fixtures and results ===
The 2013 Varsity Cup Young Guns fixtures were as follows:

- All times are South African (GMT+2).

==== Regular season ====
===== Round one =====
| 18 February 2013 | UFS Shimlas Young Guns | 16 – 18 | UP Tuks Young Guns | Shimla Park, Bloemfontein |
| 15:00 | | Report |

| 18 February 2013 | UCT Trojans | 44 – 15 | NMMU Young Guns | UCT Rugby Fields, Cape Town |
| 17:00 | | Report |

Bye/s: Maties Juniors, NWU Pukke Young Guns, UJ Young Guns, Wits Young Guns

===== Round two =====
| 25 February 2013 | NWU Pukke Young Guns | 62 – 8 | Wits Young Guns | Fanie du Toit Sport Ground, Potchefstroom |
| 17:00 | | Report |

| 25 February 2013 | NMMU Young Guns | 24 – 34 | Maties Juniors | NMMU Stadium, Port Elizabeth |
| 17:00 | | Report |

Bye/s: UCT Trojans, UFS Shimlas Young Guns, UP Tuks Young Guns, UJ Young Guns

===== Round three =====
| 4 March 2013 | UFS Shimlas Young Guns | 34 – 31 | NWU Pukke Young Guns | Shimla Park, Bloemfontein |
| 17:00 | | Report |

| 4 March 2013 | UP Tuks Young Guns | 114 – 0 | Wits Young Guns | LC de Villiers Stadium, Pretoria |
| 17:00 | | Report |

| 4 March 2013 | NMMU Young Guns | 29 – 34 | UJ Young Guns | NMMU Stadium, Port Elizabeth |
| 17:00 | | Report |

| 4 March 2013 | UCT Trojans | 16 – 45 | Maties Juniors | UCT Rugby Fields, Cape Town |
| 19:00 | | Report |

===== Round four =====
| 11 March 2013 | NWU Pukke Young Guns | 8 – 73 | UP Tuks Young Guns | Fanie du Toit Sport Ground, Potchefstroom |
| 15:00 | | Report |

| 11 March 2013 | UJ Young Guns | 36 – 41 | UCT Trojans | UJ Stadium, Johannesburg |
| 17:00 | | Report |

| 11 March 2013 | Wits Young Guns | 2 – 63 | UFS Shimlas Young Guns | Wits Rugby Stadium, Johannesburg |
| 17:00 | | Report |

Bye/s: Maties Juniors, NMMU Young Guns

===== Round Five =====
| 18 March 2013 | Maties Juniors | 44 – 2 | UJ Young Guns | Danie Craven Stadium, Stellenbosch |
| 15:00 | | Report |

Bye/s: UCT Trojans, NMMU Young Guns, NWU Pukke Young Guns, UFS Shimlas Young Guns, UP Tuks Young Guns, Wits Young Guns

==== Play-Off Games ====
===== Semi-finals =====
| 25 March 2013 | UP Tuks Young Guns | 68 – 28 | UCT Trojans | LC de Villiers Stadium, Pretoria |
| 14:00 |

| 25 March 2013 | Maties Juniors | 26 – 15 | UFS Shimlas Young Guns | Danie Craven Stadium, Stellenbosch |
| 16:30 |

===== Final =====
| 1 April 2013 | UP Tuks Young Guns | 50 – 21 | Maties Juniors |
| | | Scoreboard |

=== Honours ===
| 2013 FNB Young Guns Champions: | UP Tuks Young Guns |

== Koshuis Rugby Championship ==
=== Competition Rules ===
There were eight participating teams in the 2013 Koshuis Rugby Championship - the winners of the internal leagues of each of the eight Varsity Cup teams. These teams were divided into two pools (the Penny Pinchers pool and the Hertz pool) and played the other teams in the pool once over the course of the season, either home or away.

Teams received four points for a win and two points for a draw. Bonus points were awarded to teams that score four or more tries in a game, as well as to teams that lost a match by seven points or less. Teams were ranked by log points, then points difference (points scored less points conceded).

The top two teams in each pool qualified for the title play-offs. In the semi-finals, the teams that finished first had home advantage against the teams that finish second in their respective pools. The winners of these semi-finals played each other in the final.

=== Participating teams ===
Koshuis Rugby Championship
| Koshuis Name | University | Stadium |
| Bastion | University of Johannesburg | UJ Stadium, Johannesburg |
| Cobras | University of Cape Town | UCT Rugby Fields, Cape Town |
| Commerce | University of the Witwatersrand | Wits Rugby Stadium, Johannesburg |
| Medies | Stellenbosch University | Danie Craven Stadium, Stellenbosch |
| Mopanie | University of Pretoria | LC de Villiers Stadium, Pretoria |
| Northernz | Nelson Mandela Metropolitan University | NMMU Stadium, Port Elizabeth |
| Villagers | North-West University | Fanie du Toit Sport Ground, Potchefstroom |
| Vishuis | University of the Free State | Shimla Park, Bloemfontein |

=== Standings ===
2013 Koshuis Rugby Championship Penny Pinchers Pool Log
| | Team | Played | Won | Drawn | Lost | Points For | Points Against | Points Difference | Bonus Points | Points |
| 1 | Vishuis, UFS Shimlas | 3 | 2 | 0 | 1 | 201 | 53 | +148 | 4 | 12 |
| 2 | Bastion, UJ | 3 | 2 | 0 | 1 | 130 | 73 | +48 | 4 | 12 |
| 3 | Cobras, UCT Ikey Tigers | 3 | 2 | 0 | 1 | 107 | 90 | +17 | 2 | 10 |
| 4 | Commerce, Wits | 3 | 0 | 0 | 3 | 26 | 248 | –222 | 0 | 0 |
2013 Koshuis Rugby Championship Hertz Pool Log
| | Team | Played | Won | Drawn | Lost | Points For | Points Against | Points Difference | Bonus Points | Points |
| 1 | Villagers, NWU Pukke | 3 | 3 | 0 | 0 | 57 | 22 | +35 | 0 | 12 |
| 2 | Medies, Maties | 3 | 2 | 0 | 1 | 61 | 41 | +20 | 3 | 11 |
| 3 | Mopanie, UP Tuks | 3 | 1 | 0 | 2 | 49 | 54 | –5 | 1 | 5 |
| 4 | Northernz, NMMU Madibaz | 3 | 0 | 0 | 3 | 15 | 65 | –50 | 0 | 0 |
The top 2 teams in each pool will qualify for the semi-finals. Points breakdown: *4 points for a win *2 points for a draw *1 bonus point for a loss by seven points or less *1 bonus point for scoring four or more tries in a match

=== Fixtures and results ===
The 2013 Koshuis Rugby Championship fixtures are as follows:

- All times are South African (GMT+2).

==== Regular season ====
===== Round one =====
| 18 February 2013 | Commerce, Wits | 8 – 119 | Vishuis, UFS Shimlas | Wits Rugby Stadium, Johannesburg |
| 17:00 | | Report |

| 18 February 2013 | Medies, Maties | 23 – 5 | Northernz, NMMU Madibaz | Danie Craven Stadium, Stellenbosch |
| 17:00 | | Report |

Bye/s: Bastion, UJ; Cobras, UCT Ikey Tigers; Mopanie, UP Tuks; Villagers, NWU Pukke

===== Round two =====
| 25 February 2013 | Commerce, Wits | 10 – 69 | Bastion, UJ | Wits Rugby Stadium, Johannesburg |
| 15:00 | | Report |

| 25 February 2013 | Mopanie, UP Tuks | 24 – 28 | Medies, Maties | LC de Villiers Stadium, Pretoria |
| 17:00 | | Report |

| 25 February 2013 | Villagers, NWU Pukke | 24 – 5 | Northernz, NMMU Madibaz | Fanie du Toit Sport Ground, Potchefstroom |
| 17:00 | | Report |

Bye/s: Cobras, UCT Ikey Tigers; Vishuis, UFS Shimlas

===== Round three =====
| 4 March 2013 | Cobras, UCT Ikey Tigers | 34 – 29 | Bastion, UJ | UCT Rugby Fields, Cape Town |
| 15:00 | | Report |

Bye/s: Commerce, Wits; Medics, Maties; Mopanie, UP Tuks; Northernz, NMMU Madibaz; Villagers, NWU Pukke; Vishuis, UFS Shimlas

===== Round four =====
| 11 March 2013 | Villagers, NWU Pukke | 21 – 7 | Mopanie, UP Tuks | Fanie du Toit Sport Ground, Potchefstroom |
| 15:00 | | Report |

| 11 March 2013 | Vishuis, UFS Shimlas | 53 – 13 | Cobras, UCT Ikey Tigers | Shimla Park, Bloemfontein |
| 16:45 | | Report |

Bye/s: Bastion, UJ; Commerce, Wits; Medics, Maties; Northernz, NMMU Madibaz

===== Round Five =====
| 18 March 2013 | Bastion, UJ | 32 – 29 | Vishuis, UFS Shimlas | UJ Stadium, Johannesburg |
| 15:00 | | Report |

| 18 March 2013 | Cobras, UCT Ikey Tigers | 60 – 8 | Commerce, Wits | UCT Rugby Fields, Cape Town |
| 16:45 | | Report |

| 18 March 2013 | Medies, Maties | 10 – 12 | Villagers, NWU Pukke | Danie Craven Stadium, Stellenbosch |
| 16:45 | | Report |

| 18 March 2013 | Northernz, NMMU Madibaz | 5 – 18 | Mopanie, UP Tuks | NMMU Stadium, Port Elizabeth |
| 16:45 | | Report |

==== Play-Off Games ====
===== Semi-finals =====
| 25 March 2013 | Vishuis, UFS Shimlas | 31 – 26 | Medies, Maties | Shimla Park, Bloemfontein |
| 17:00 | | Report |

| 25 March 2013 | Villagers, NWU Pukke | 39 – 2 | Bastion, UJ | Fanie du Toit Sport Ground, Potchefstroom |
| 19:00 | | Report |

===== Final =====
| 8 Apr 2013 | Vishuis, UFS Shimlas | 20 – 16 | Villagers, NWU Pukke | Danie Craven Stadium, Stellenbosch |
| | | Report |

=== Honours ===
| 2013 Steinhoff Koshuis Rugby Champions: | Vishuis, UFS Shimlas |

== South African Universities ==
In April 2013, a South African Universities team was named, picked from players that played in Varsity Rugby in 2013, to play against Namibia in Windhoek.

=== Squads ===
The team was named as follows:

=== Fixtures ===
| 4 May 2013 | South African Universities | 50 – 39 | Namibia | Hage Geingob Stadium, Windhoek |
| | Try: JP Lewis; Martin Ferreira; JR Esterhuizen; Os Hamman; Roy Godfrey; Con: Justin van Staden | Namibia Sport | Try: PJ van Lill; Malcolm Moore; Ian van Wyk; Callie Swanepoel; Con: Justin Nel; Theuns Kotzé; Pen: Justin Nel |

== See also ==
- Varsity Cup
- 2013 Currie Cup Premier Division
- 2013 Currie Cup First Division
- 2013 Vodacom Cup
