= 2015 Varsity Rugby =

2015 Varsity Rugby was the 2015 edition of four rugby union competitions annually played between several university teams in South Africa. It was contested from January to April 2015 and was the eighth edition of these competitions.

== Rules ==
All four 2015 Varsity Rugby competitions used a different scoring system to the regular system. Tries were worth five points as usual, but conversions were worth three points, while penalties and drop goals were only worth two points.

All Varsity Cup games also had two referees officiating each game, props' jerseys featured a special gripping patch to ensure better binding, intended to reduce collapsing scrums and the mark was extended to the entire field.

== Varsity Cup ==
The following teams competed in the 2015 Varsity Cup: Maties, NMMU Madibaz, NWU Pukke, UCT Ikey Tigers, UFS Shimlas, UJ, UP Tuks and CUT Ixias, who took part in this competition for the first time following their promotion from the 2014 Varsity Shield. The tournament was won by UFS Shimlas, who beat NWU Pukke 63–33 in the final. There was no relegation at the end of 2015.

== Varsity Shield ==
The following teams competed in the 2015 Varsity Shield: TUT Vikings, UFH Blues, UKZN Impi, UWC and Wits, who have been relegated from the 2014 Varsity Cup. The tournament was won by UKZN Impi, who beat Wits 29–24 in the final. There was no promotion at the end of 2015.

== Young Guns ==
=== Competition Rules ===
There were eight participating universities in the 2015 Young Guns competition. These teams were divided into two pools and each team played every team in the other pool once over the course of the season, either home or away.

Teams received four points for a win and two points for a draw. Bonus points were awarded to teams that scored four or more tries in a game, as well as to teams that lost a match by seven points or less. Teams were ranked by log points, then points difference (points scored less points conceded).

The top two teams overall qualified for the title play-off final.

=== Teams ===
2015 Young Guns teams
Team	University	Stadium
CUT Young Guns	Central Institute of Technology	CUT Stadium, Bloemfontein
Maties Juniors	Stellenbosch University	Danie Craven Stadium, Stellenbosch
NMMU Young Guns	Nelson Mandela Metropolitan University	NMMU Stadium, Port Elizabeth
NWU Pukke Young Guns	North-West University	Fanie du Toit Sport Ground, Potchefstroom
UCT Trojans	University of Cape Town	UCT Rugby Fields, Cape Town
UFS Shimlas Young Guns	University of the Free State	Shimla Park, Bloemfontein
UJ Young Guns	University of Johannesburg	UJ Stadium, Johannesburg
UP Tuks Young Guns	University of Pretoria	LC de Villiers Stadium, Pretoria

=== Standings ===
The final league standings for the 2015 Varsity Cup Young Guns were:

2015 Varsity Cup Young Guns log
Pos	Team	Pl	W	D	L	PF	PA	PD	TF	TA	TB	LB	Pts
1	UFS Shimlas Young Guns	4	4	0	0	147	77	+70	21	10	4	0	20
2	UP Tuks Young Guns	4	3	0	1	156	81	+75	21	10	3	0	15
3	NMMU Young Guns	4	3	0	1	127	76	+51	19	11	3	0	15
4	UJ Young Guns	4	2	0	2	145	132	+13	20	18	3	1	12
5	NWU Pukke Young Guns	4	2	0	2	107	113	−6	15	15	2	1	11
6	UCT Trojans	4	2	0	2	93	104	−11	13	15	2	1	11
7	Maties Juniors	4	0	0	4	57	138	−81	9	21	0	1	1
8	CUT Young Guns	4	0	0	4	69	180	−111	9	27	1	0	1
* Legend: Pos = Position, Pl = Played, W = Won, D = Drawn, L = Lost, PF = Points for, PA = Points against, PD = Points difference, TF = Tries for, TA = Tries against, TB = Try bonus points, LB = Losing bonus points, Pts = Log points UFS Shimlas Young Guns and UP Tuks Young Guns qualified to the final. Points breakdown: *4 points for a win *2 points for a draw *1 bonus point for a loss by eight points or less *1 bonus point for scoring four or more tries in a match

=== Fixtures and results ===
The 2015 Varsity Cup Young Guns fixtures were as follows:

- All times are South African (GMT+2).

==== Round one ====
23 February 2014	CUT Young Guns	8–44	UFS Shimlas Young Guns	CUT Stadium, Bloemfontein
14:15		Report

23 February 2014	UP Tuks Young Guns	45–20	UCT Trojans	LC de Villiers Stadium, Pretoria
14:15		Report

23 February 2014	UJ Young Guns	29–37	NWU Pukke Young Guns	UJ Stadium, Johannesburg
16:00		Report

Bye/s: Maties Juniors, NMMU Young Guns

==== Round two ====
2 March 2014	NWU Pukke Young Guns	26–34	NMMU Young Guns	Fanie du Toit Sport Ground, Potchefstroom
14:00		Report

2 March 2014	UFS Shimlas Young Guns	29–21	Maties Juniors	Shimla Park, Bloemfontein
14:00		Report

2 March 2014	UCT Trojans	34–24	CUT Young Guns	UCT Rugby Fields, Cape Town
14:15		Report

Bye/s: UJ Young Guns, UP Tuks Young Guns

==== Round three ====
9 March 2014	UP Tuks Young Guns	53–16	UJ Young Guns	LC de Villiers Stadium, Pretoria
14:00		Report

9 March 2014	Maties Juniors	15–26	UCT Trojans	Danie Craven Stadium, Stellenbosch
14:15		Report

9 March 2014	NWU Pukke Young Guns	24–37	UFS Shimlas Young Guns	Fanie du Toit Sport Ground, Potchefstroom
14:15		Report

9 March 2014	NMMU Young Guns	44–0	CUT Young Guns	NMMU Stadium, Port Elizabeth
16:00		Report

==== Round four ====
16 March 2014	Maties Juniors	16–41	NMMU Young Guns	Danie Craven Stadium, Stellenbosch
14:00		Report

16 March 2014	UFS Shimlas Young Guns	37–24	UP Tuks Young Guns	Shimla Park, Bloemfontein
14:15		Report

16 March 2014	CUT Young Guns	37–58	UJ Young Guns	CUT Stadium, Bloemfontein
16:00		Report

Bye/s: NWU Pukke Young Guns, UCT Trojans

==== Round five ====
23 March 2014	UCT Trojans	13–20	NWU Pukke Young Guns	UCT Rugby Fields, Cape Town
16:00		Report

23 March 2014	NMMU Young Guns	8–34	UP Tuks Young Guns	NMMU Stadium, Port Elizabeth
19:00		Report

Bye/s: CUT Young Guns, Maties Juniors, UFS Shimlas Young Guns, UJ Young Guns

==== Round six ====
30 March 2014	UJ Young Guns	42–5	Maties Juniors	UJ Stadium, Johannesburg
14:15		Report

Bye/s: CUT Young Guns, NMMU Young Guns, NWU Pukke Young Guns, UCT Trojans, UFS Shimlas Young Guns, UP Tuks Young Guns

=== Final ===
6 April 2014	UFS Shimlas Young Guns	13–26	UP Tuks Young Guns	Shimla Park, Bloemfontein
19:00		Report

== Koshuis Rugby Championship ==
=== Competition Rules ===
There were eight participating teams in the 2015 Koshuis Rugby Championship competition, the winners of the internal leagues of each of the eight Varsity Cup teams. These teams were divided into two pools and each team played every team in the other pool once over the course of the season, either home or away.

Teams received four points for a win and two points for a draw. Bonus points were awarded to teams that scored four or more tries in a game, as well as to teams that lost a match by seven points or less. Teams were ranked by log points, then points difference (points scored less points conceded).

The top two teams overall qualified for the title play-off final.

=== Teams ===
2015 Koshuis Rugby Championship teams
Team	University	Stadium
Bastion, UJ	University of Johannesburg	UJ Stadium, Johannesburg
Cobras, UCT Ikey Tigers	University of Cape Town	UCT Rugby Fields, Cape Town
Medies, Maties	Stellenbosch University	Danie Craven Stadium, Stellenbosch
Mopanie, UP Tuks	University of Pretoria	LC de Villiers Stadium, Pretoria
Patria, NWU Pukke	North-West University	Fanie du Toit Sport Ground, Potchefstroom
Stallions, NMMU Madibaz	Nelson Mandela Metropolitan University	NMMU Stadium, Port Elizabeth
Tigers, CUT Ixias	Central Institute of Technology	CUT Stadium, Bloemfontein
Vishuis, UFS Shimlas	University of the Free State	Shimla Park, Bloemfontein

=== Standings ===
The final league standings for the 2015 Koshuis Rugby Championship were:

2015 Koshuis Rugby Championship log
Pos	Team	Pl	W	D	L	PF	PA	PD	TF	TA	TB	LB	Pts
1	Mopanie, UP Tuks	4	4	0	0	196	62	+134	29	10	3	0	19
2	Vishuis, UFS Shimlas	4	3	0	1	128	65	+63	19	9	3	1	16
3	Patria, NWU Pukke	4	3	0	1	191	26	+165	28	4	2	1	15
4	Medies, Maties	4	2	0	2	158	99	+59	22	15	3	0	11
5	Bastion, UJ	4	2	0	2	75	107	-32	11	15	1	0	9
6	Tigers, CUT Ixias	4	2	0	2	69	125	-56	11	19	1	0	9
7	Cobras, UCT Ikey Tigers	4	0	0	4	15	146	-131	2	21	0	2	2
8	Stallions, NMMU Madibaz	4	0	0	4	18	220	-202	3	32	0	0	0
* Legend: Pos = Position, Pl = Played, W = Won, D = Drawn, L = Lost, PF = Points for, PA = Points against, PD = Points difference, TF = Tries for, TA = Tries against, TB = Try bonus points, LB = Losing bonus points, Pts = Log points Mopanie and Vishuis qualified to the final. Points breakdown: *4 points for a win *2 points for a draw *1 bonus point for a loss by seven points or less *1 bonus point for scoring four or more tries in a match

=== Fixtures and results ===
The 2015 Koshuis Rugby Championship fixtures were as follows:

- All times are South African (GMT+2).

==== Round one ====
23 February 2015	Cobras	7–12	Bastion	UCT Rugby Fields, Cape Town
16:15		Report

23 February 2015	Mopanie	44–34	Medies	LC de Villiers Stadium, Pretoria
16:45		Report

23 February 2015	Tigers	12–36	Vishuis	CUT Stadium, Bloemfontein
19:00		Report

Bye/s: Patria, Stallions

==== Round two ====
2 March 2015	Patria	10–13	Mopanie	Fanie du Toit Sport Ground, Potchefstroom
16:15		Report

2 March 2015	Vishuis	50–21	Medies	Shimla Park, Bloemfontein
16:15		Report

2 March 2015	Stallions	0–34	Bastion	NMMU Stadium, Port Elizabeth
16:45		Report

2 March 2015	Cobras	8–10	Tigers	UCT Rugby Fields, Cape Town
19:00		Report

==== Round three ====
9 March 2015	Mopanie	68–5	Tigers	LC de Villiers Stadium, Pretoria
16:15		Report

9 March 2015	Patria	81–0	Stallions	Fanie du Toit Sport Ground, Potchefstroom
16:45		Report

9 March 2015	Medies	40–0	Cobras	Danie Craven Stadium, Stellenbosch
19:00		Report

Bye/s: Bastion, Vishuis

==== Round four ====
16 March 2015	Medies	63–5	Stallions	Danie Craven Stadium, Stellenbosch
16:15		Report

16 March 2015	Bastion	16–29	Vishuis	UJ Stadium, Johannesburg
16:45		Report

Bye/s: Cobras, Mopanie, Patria, Tigers

==== Round five ====
23 March 2015	Tigers	42–13	Stallions	CUT Stadium, Bloemfontein
16:15		Report

23 March 2015	Vishuis	13–16	Patria	Shimla Park, Bloemfontein
16:45		Report

Bye/s: Bastion, Cobras, Medies, Mopanie

==== Round six ====
30 March 2015	Bastion	13–71	Mopanie	UJ Stadium, Johannesburg
16:30		Report

30 March 2015	Patria	84–0	Cobras	Fanie du Toit Sport Ground, Potchefstroom
16:30		Report

Bye/s: Medies, Stallions, Tigers, Vishuis

==== Final ====
13 April 2015	Mopanie	29–23	Vishuis	Shimla Park, Bloemfontein
16:30		Report

== See also ==
- Varsity Cup
- 2015 Currie Cup Premier Division
- 2015 Currie Cup qualification
- 2015 Currie Cup First Division
- 2015 Vodacom Cup
- 2015 Varsity Cup
- 2015 Varsity Shield
- 2015 SARU Community Cup
- 2015 Under-21 Provincial Championship Group A
- 2015 Under-21 Provincial Championship Group B
- 2015 Under-19 Provincial Championship Group A
- 2015 Under-19 Provincial Championship Group B
