= 2023 Varsity Cup =

South African college rugby competition

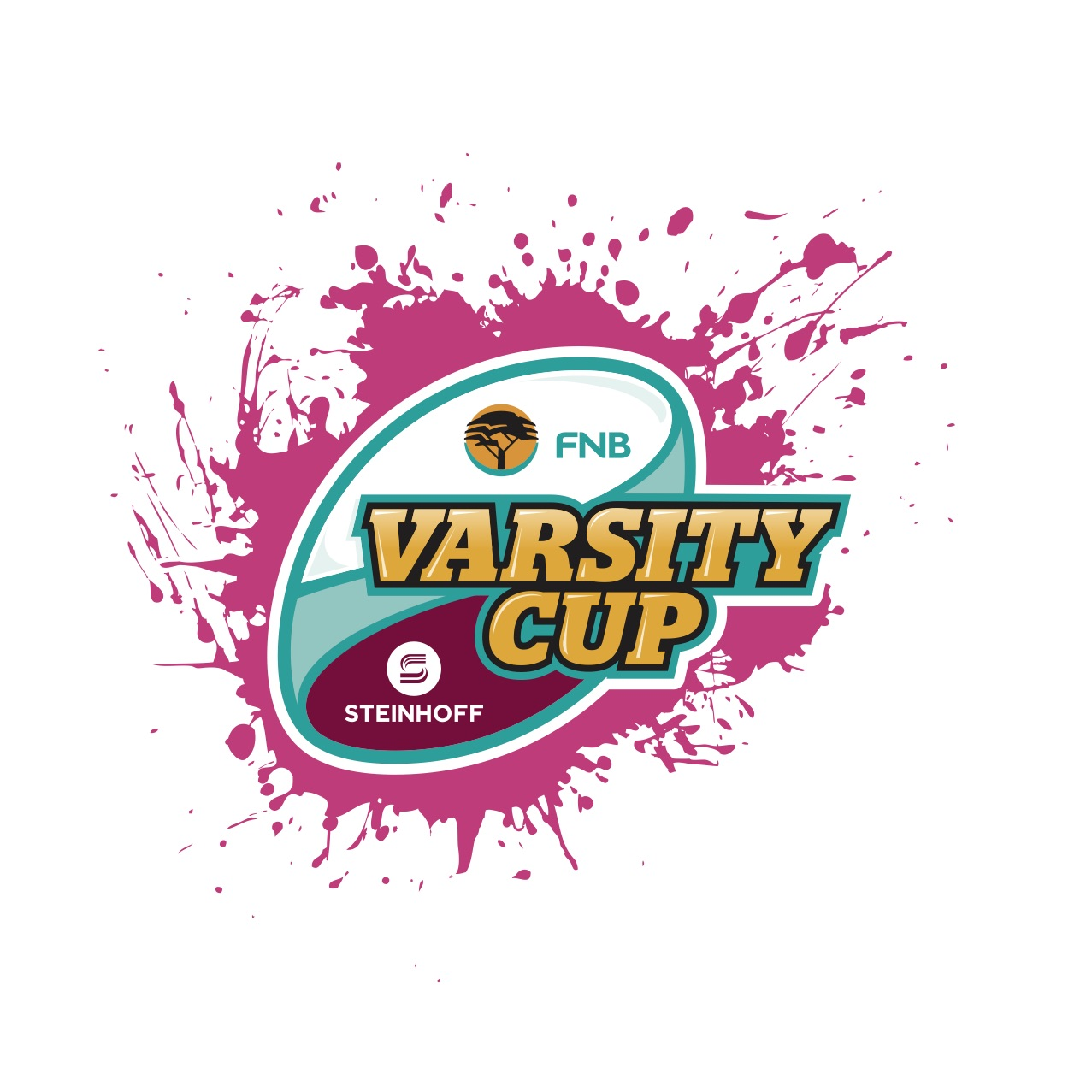
- Countries: South Africa
- Date: 20 February – 17 April 2023
- Champions: NWU Eagles (2nd title)
- Runners-up: UCT Ikey Tigers
- Relegated: UP Tuks
- Matches played: 59
- Top point scorer: Ntokozo Makhaza (127 - UCT Ikey Tigers)
- Top try scorer: Vernon Paulo (11 - NWU Eagles)

The 2023 Varsity Cup was the 16th season of the Varsity Cup, the top competition in the annual Varsity Rugby series in men's rugby union. It was played between 20 February and 27 April 2023 and featured eight university teams.

The 2023 season included notable upsets and intense competition, such as UJ securing a home victory over defending champions UCT Ikey Tigers in March. In the championship match, NWU Eagles edged out the UCT Ikey Tigers 27‑25 to claim their second Varsity Cup title. The tournament also marked the return of full‑capacity crowds at campus stadiums and the ongoing growth of varsity rugby following COVID‑19 disruptions.

== Competition rules and information ==
There were eight participating university teams in the 2023 Varsity Cup. They played each other once during the pool stage, either at home or away. Teams received four points for a win and two points for a draw. Bonus points were awarded to teams that scored four or more tries in a game, as well as to teams that lost a match by seven points or less. Teams were ranked by log points, then points difference (points scored less points conceded).

The top four teams after the pool stage qualified for the semifinals, which were followed by a final.

== Teams ==
Location of teams in the 2023 Varsity Cup
Western Cape

The teams that played in the 2023 Varsity Cup are:

2023 Varsity Cup teams
Team name	University	Stadium
CUT Ixias	Central University of Technology	CUT Stadium, Bloemfontein
Maties	Stellenbosch University	Danie Craven Stadium, Stellenbosch
NWU Eagles	North-West University	Fanie du Toit Sport Ground, Potchefstroom
UCT Ikey Tigers	University of Cape Town	UCT Rugby Fields, Cape Town
UFS Shimlas	University of the Free State	Shimla Park, Bloemfontein
UJ	University of Johannesburg	UJ Stadium, Johannesburg
UP Tuks	University of Pretoria	LC de Villiers Stadium, Pretoria
Wits	University of the Witwatersrand	Wits Rugby Stadium, Johannesburg

== Standings ==
The final log for the 2023 Varsity Cup was:

2023 Varsity Cup log
Pos	Team	P	W	D	L	PF	PA	PD	TB	LB	Pts
1	NWU Eagles	7	6	0	1	281	154	+127	2	1	27
2	UFS Shimlas	7	5	0	2	223	220	+3	2	0	22
3	UCT Ikey Tigers	7	4	0	3	263	187	+76	4	1	21
4	Maties	7	4	0	3	223	250	−27	2	1	19
5	UJ	7	3	0	4	231	254	−23	3	2	17
6	Wits	7	3	0	4	228	267	−39	2	2	16
7	CUT Ixias	7	3	0	4	262	321	−59	3	0	15
8	UP Tuks	7	0	0	7	192	250	−58	1	4	5

Legend and competition rules
Legend:
Qualified for the semifinals.	P = Games played, W = Games won, D = Games drawn, L = Games lost, PF = Points for, PA = Points against, PD = Points difference, TF = Tries for, TA = Tries against, TB = Try bonus points, LB = Losing bonus points, Pts = Log points
Competition rules:
Qualification: The top four teams qualified for the semifinals. Points breakdown: * 4 points for a win * 2 points for a draw * 1 bonus point for a loss by seven points or less * 1 bonus point for scoring four or more tries in a match

== Pool stage ==
=== Matches ===
The following matches were played in the 2023 Varsity Cup:

==== Round one ====
20 February 2023	CUT Ixias	49–59	Wits	CUT Stadium, Bloemfontein
13:30		Report

20 February 2023	UP Tuks	25–26	UFS Shimlas	LC de Villiers Stadium, Pretoria
15:00		Report

20 February 2023	Maties	21–19	UCT Ikey Tigers	Danie Craven Stadium, Stellenbosch
17:00		Report

20 February 2023	NWU Eagles	41–28	UJ	Fanie du Toit Sport Ground, Potchefstroom
17:00		Report

==== Round two ====
27 February 2023	NWU Eagles	63–16	UFS Shimlas	Fanie du Toit Sport Ground, Potchefstroom
15:00		Report

27 February 2023	Wits	35–33	UJ	Wits Rugby Stadium, Johannesburg
17:00		Report

27 February 2023	UCT Ikey Tigers	40–19	UP Tuks	UCT Rugby Fields, Cape Town
17:00		Report

27 February 2023	Maties	19–23	CUT Ixias	Danie Craven Stadium, Stellenbosch
17:00		Report

==== Round three ====
6 March 2023	CUT Ixias	41–39	UP Tuks	CUT Stadium, Bloemfontein
13:30		Report

6 March 2023	UJ	43–24	UCT Ikey Tigers	UJ Stadium, Johannesburg
15:00		Report

6 March 2023	NWU Eagles	28–31	Maties	Fanie du Toit Sport Ground, Potchefstroom
17:00		Report

6 March 2023	UFS Shimlas	26–25	Wits	Shimla Park, Bloemfontein
17:00		Report

==== Round four ====
13 March 2023	UJ	12–54	CUT Ixias	UJ Stadium, Johannesburg
14:00		Report

13 March 2023	UCT Ikey Tigers	29–12	UFS Shimlas	UCT Rugby Fields, Cape Town
17:00		Report

13 March 2023	Wits	54–56	Maties	Wits Rugby Stadium, Johannesburg
17:00		Report

13 March 2023	UP Tuks	22–26	NWU Eagles	LC de Villiers Stadium, Pretoria
17:00		Report

==== Round five ====
20 March 2023	UCT Ikey Tigers	46–19	Wits	UCT Rugby Fields, Cape Town
14:00		Report

20 March 2023	NWU Eagles	45–28	CUT Ixias	Fanie du Toit Sport Ground, Potchefstroom
17:00		Report

20 March 2023	UFS Shimlas	31–30	UJ	Shimla Park, Bloemfontein
17:00		Report

20 March 2023	Maties	46–35	UP Tuks	Danie Craven Stadium, Stellenbosch
17:00		Report

==== Round six ====
27 March 2023	UJ	47–38	Maties	UJ Stadium, Johannesburg
14:00		Report

27 March 2023	Wits	33–21	UP Tuks	Wits Rugby Stadium, Johannesburg
15:00		Report

27 March 2023	UCT Ikey Tigers	26–42	NWU Eagles	UCT Rugby Fields, Cape Town
17:00		Report

27 March 2023	UFS Shimlas	68–36	CUT Ixias	Shimla Park, Bloemfontein
17:00		Report

==== Round seven ====
3 April 2023	CUT Ixias	31–79	UCT Ikey Tigers	CUT Stadium, Bloemfontein
13:30		Report

3 April 2023	Wits	3–36	NWU Eagles	Wits Rugby Stadium, Johannesburg
17:00		Report

3 April 2023	UP Tuks	31–38	UJ	LC de Villiers Stadium, Pretoria
17:00		Report

3 April 2023	Maties	12–44	UFS Shimlas	Danie Craven Stadium, Stellenbosch
17:00		Report

== Play-offs ==
Semi-finals
10 April 2023
UFS Shimlas	30
UCT Ikey Tigers	65
10 April 2023
NWU Eagles	19
Maties	10

Final
17 April 2023
NWU Eagles	27
UCT Ikey Tigers	25

=== Semi-finals ===
10 April 2023
15:00

UFS Shimlas	30–65	UCT Ikey Tigers
Try: Nkula 41'; Adams 55'; Farmer 67'; Kunene 75'; Con: Wentzel 42' 68', 76'	Report	Try: Delport 5'; Crous 7'; Makhaza 24'; Blanckenberg 27'; Koevort 35', 46', 53'; Hayes 65'; Davis 78'; Con: Makhaza 7', 24', 28', 36', 66'; Pen: Makhaza (60 p), (70 p)

Shimla Park, Bloemfontein
Player That Rocks - David Hayes, UCT Ikey Tigers
Attendance: 5,000 +

10 April 2023
17:00

NWU Eagles	19-10	Maties
Try: Swanepoel 8', 42'; De Beer 71'; Con: Robinson 8', 42'	Report	Try: Topley 61'; Con: Matthee 62'; Drop: Matthee 39'

Fanie du Toit Sport Ground, Potchefstroom
FNB Player That Rocks - Tino Swanepoel, NWU Eagles
Attendance: 5,000 +

=== Final ===
17 April 2023
17:00

NWU Eagles	27–25	UCT Ikey Tigers
Try: Paulo 9', 32'; Swanepoel 35', 55'; Con: Robinson 36', 56'; Pen: Robinson (20 p)	Report	Try: Crous 43'; Van der Walt 70'; Con: Makhaza 43', 71'; Pen: Makhaza (2 p), (21 p), (29 p)

Fanie du Toit Sport Ground, Potchefstroom
FNB Player That Rocks - Reynhardt Crous, UCT Ikey Tigers
Attendance: 5,000 +

NWU Eagles	UCT

FB	15	Santino Swanepoel
RW	14	Ricardo Windvogel
OC	13	Gerhardus Pretorius
IC	12	Vincent Phatudi
LW	11	Naiden Jaarts
FH	10	Zinedine Robinson
SH	9	Sylvester Hassien
N8	8	Zacharias Erlank
OF	7	Henlein Bertram|
BF	6	Chris Vermaak
RL	5	Wihan Nel
LL	4	Stephan Krugel
TP	3	Ruan Swiegers (c)
HK	2	Vernon Paulo
LP	1	Ruben du Plessis
Replacements:
	16	Chyle Van Zyl
	17	Jason Jansen
	18	Eben Brand
	19	Miyelani Ngobeni
	20	Jandre De Beer
	21	Aphelele Madaka
	22	Martin Venter
	23	Matthew Fortuin
Coach:
Burger van der Westhuizen

FB	15	Duran Koevort
RW	14	Rethabile Louw
OC	13	Joshua Boulle
IC	12	Kyle Lamb
LW	11	Ntokozo Makhaza
FH	10	David Hayes
SH	9	Asad Moos
N8	8	Laro Delport
OF	7	Kyle Ndiao
BF	6	Siphomezo Dyonase
RL	5	George van der Westhuizen
LL	4	Reynhardt Crous
TP	3	Bryan le Roux
HK	2	Keagan Blanckenberg
LP	1	Luthando Woji (c)
Replacements:
	16	Alex Castle
	17	Christian
	18	Jovan Bekker
	19	Jac van der Walt
	20	Jason Macleod Smith
	21	Ndudula
	22	Lezane Davis
	23	Rihaz Fredericks
Coach:
Tom Dawson-Squibb

Player of the Match:
Reynhardt Crous UCT Ikey Tigers

== Honours ==
The honour roll for the 2023 Varsity Cup was as follows:

2023 Varsity Cup Honours
Champions:	NWU Eagles (2nd title)
Player That Rocks:	Lourens Oosthuizen, UFS Shimlas
Forward That Rocks:	Lourens Oosthuizen, UFS Shimlas
Back That Rocks:	Zane Bester, UFS Shimlas
Rookie of the year:	Asad Moos, UCT Ikey Tigers
Top Points Scorer:	Ntokozo Makhaza, UCT Ikey Tigers (127)
Top Try Scorer:	Vernon Paulo, NWU Eagles (11)
