= Varsity Rugby =

South African collegiate sports competition

Varsity Cup
- Current season or competition: 2026 Varsity Cup
- Sport: Rugby union
- Instituted: 2008
- Inaugural season: 2008
- Chair: Francois Pienaar (Founder)
- Number of teams: 8 (Cup); 8 (Shield)
- Country: South Africa
- Holders: UP Tuks (2026)
- Most titles: UP Tuks (6 titles)
- Website: www.varsitycup.co.za
- Broadcast partner: Supersport
- Relegation to: Varsity Shield

Varsity Cup
Varsity Shield
Young Guns
Women’s
Res

Varsity Cup is the collective name for four South African rugby union competitions involving the top rugby playing universities in the country. It was launched in 2008, with eight teams participating in the Varsity Cup competition and each university's internal champions competing in the Koshuis Rugby Championships (now known as Res Rugby). In 2011, a second tier competition called the Varsity Shield was added, increasing the number of participating universities to thirteen. A Young Guns tournament for the Under-20 side of the Varsity Cup teams was launched in 2012. A further expansion for the 2017 season saw three additional universities added to the Varsity Shield, totaling sixteen teams.

The 2026 Varsity Cup tournament was the 19th season of the rugby union competition, the highest university rugby competition in South Africa. UP Tuks were the 2026 Varsity Cup champions, securing a record sixth Varsity Cup title, the most by any team in the competition’s history. The Varsity Cup was dominated by Maties during the competition's formative years. In 2025 the UCT Ikey Tigers beat Maties after they won the first three tournaments in a row. Four other sides – NWU Eagles (NWU Pukke), UCT Ikey Tigers, UFS Shimlas and UP Tuks – have also won the tournament subsequently. Those five sides, along with UJ, participated in the Varsity Cup in each season since its conception, while CUT Ixias, NMU Madibaz, TUT Vikings, UWC and Wits participated in the Varsity Cup on occasion, but also played in the second-tier Varsity Shield competition in certain seasons. CPUT, Rhodes, UFH Blues, UKZN Impi and WSU All Blacks have never been able to win promotion to the Varsity Cup, spending all their time in the Varsity Shield tournament.

Currently the only team to have won the Varsity Cup and have been demoted to the Varsity Shield are UP Tuks, following a winless 2023 Varsity Cup campaign.

== History ==
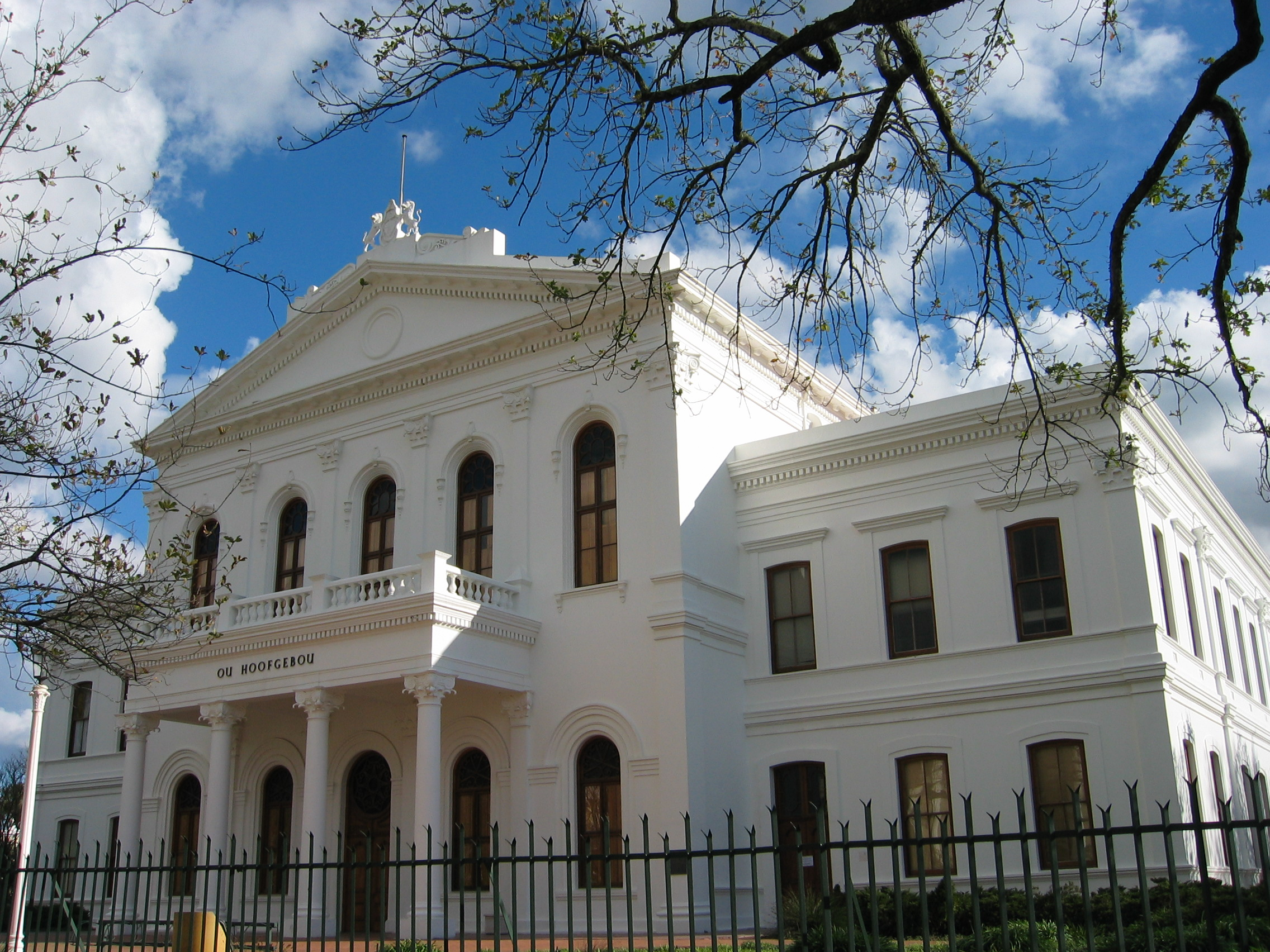
Maties won the first three Varsity Cup competitions

The Varsity Cup tournament was founded in 2008, with former Springbok World Cup winning captain, Francois Piennaar playing a key role in the establishment. It featured the rugby teams of eight universities, with Maties, NMU Madibaz, NWU Pukke, TUT Vikings, UCT Ikey Tigers, UFS Shimlas, UJ and UP Tuks being the founding members of the competition. At the same time, the Koshuis Rugby Championships (now known as Res Rugby) was also launched; this competition featured the university residence (koshuis) teams that won the internal league for each of the Varsity Cup universities.

In 2011, a second tier was added below the Varsity Cup tournament, called the Varsity Shield, which featured the rugby teams of a further five universities. CUT Ixias, UFH Blues, UKZN Impi, UWC and Wits were the expansion teams that were added to the Varsity Shield for its first season.

In 2012, an Under-20 competition was also added, called the Young Guns. Each season, the same eight teams that took part in the Varsity Cup could enter their youth teams in this Young Guns competition. The name "Varsity Rugby" was also coined in 2012 to describe the four competitions collectively.

From the inception of the tournament in 2008 until 2017, the title sponsors of the tournaments were First National Bank and Steinhoff International. For this reason, the competitions were officially known as the "FNB Varsity Cup presented by Steinhoff International", "FNB Varsity Shield presented by Steinhoff International", "FNB Young Guns presented by Steinhoff International" and the "Steinhoff Koshuis Rugby Championships". In 2018, Steinhoff withdrew as a sponsor, with FNB retaining the sponsorship rights.

== Player eligibility ==
The Varsity Rugby competitions implemented rules to help ensure that the majority of the players are bona fide students of the relevant universities. In the 2012 season, Varsity Cup and Varsity Shield sides were required to have 16 full-time students in their 23-man squads. The Young Guns and Res Rugby competitions were restricted to full-time students only. In the 2013 season, Varsity Cup teams were required to have 18 full-time students in their 23-man squads. In addition, students needed to have passed at least 30% of their previous year's courses, and all players, even non-students, must have finished high school. From the 2014 season, Varsity Cup teams were required to have 20 full-time students in their 23-man squads and an entire squad consisting of full-time students were to be fielded from 2015 onwards.

A quota system was also introduced to aid transformation in rugby. Each team had to include a certain number of players of colour in both their matchday squads and starting line-ups (for 2018, eight players of colour had to be included in the matchday squad, with five of those in the starting line-up).

== Competition rules ==
Throughout its history, Varsity Rugby adopted experimental rules during the competitions. Since 2012, a points scoring system was adopted whereby conversions would count three points instead of the traditional two, while penalties and drop goals would count two points instead of the usual three. In 2016, a bonus points system was introduced whereby teams could get two of four bonus points for tries, based on where the try-scoring move originated on the field of play. 2017 saw this rule simplified: if a try is originated from the scoring team's own half, it receives two extra points.

The competition was one of the first to adopt 23-man squads to include two props, which reduced the number of uncontested scrums in matches. They also experimented with having two referees officiating in matches and a white card review system, whereby team captains can refer certain incidents to the television match official.

In addition, each school nominates a "Player That Rocks" each week, who wears pink shorts in his next game. Proceeds from the "Player That Rocks" initiative, along with other fund-raisers, go to a charity nominated by each university that fights domestic violence in their local area.

== Teams ==
The following sides have participated in Varsity Rugby since the competition's inception in 2008:

Location of Varsity Rugby teams.
indicates current Varsity Cup teams, indicates current Varsity Shield teams

List Varsity Cup teams
Team	University	Stadium
CUT Ixias	Central University of Technology	CUT Stadium, Bloemfontein
Maties	Stellenbosch University	Danie Craven Stadium, Stellenbosch
NWU Eagles	North-West University	Fanie du Toit Sport Ground, Potchefstroom
UCT Ikey Tigers	University of Cape Town	UCT Rugby Fields, Cape Town
UFS Shimlas	University of the Free State	Shimla Park, Bloemfontein
UJ	University of Johannesburg	UJ Stadium, Johannesburg
UP Tuks	University of Pretoria	LC de Villiers Stadium, Pretoria
Wits	University of the Witwatersrand	Wits Rugby Stadium, Johannesburg
Emeris	Varsity College	University of KwaZulu Natal
List of Varsity Shield teams
Team	University	Stadium
CPUT	Cape Peninsula University of Technology	CPUT Sports Stadium, Cape Town
NMU Madibaz	Nelson Mandela University	NMU Stadium, Port Elizabeth
Rhodes	Rhodes University	Rhodes Great Field, Grahamstown
TUT Vikings	Tshwane University of Technology	TUT Stadium, Pretoria
UFH Blues	University of Fort Hare	Davidson Rugby Field, Alice
UKZN Impi	University of KwaZulu-Natal	Peter Booysen Sports Park, Pietermaritzburg
UWC	University of the Western Cape	UWC Sport Stadium, Cape Town
WSU All Blacks	Walter Sisulu University	Buffalo City Stadium, East London
Emeris	Varsity College	University of KwaZulu Natal

== Varsity Cup ==
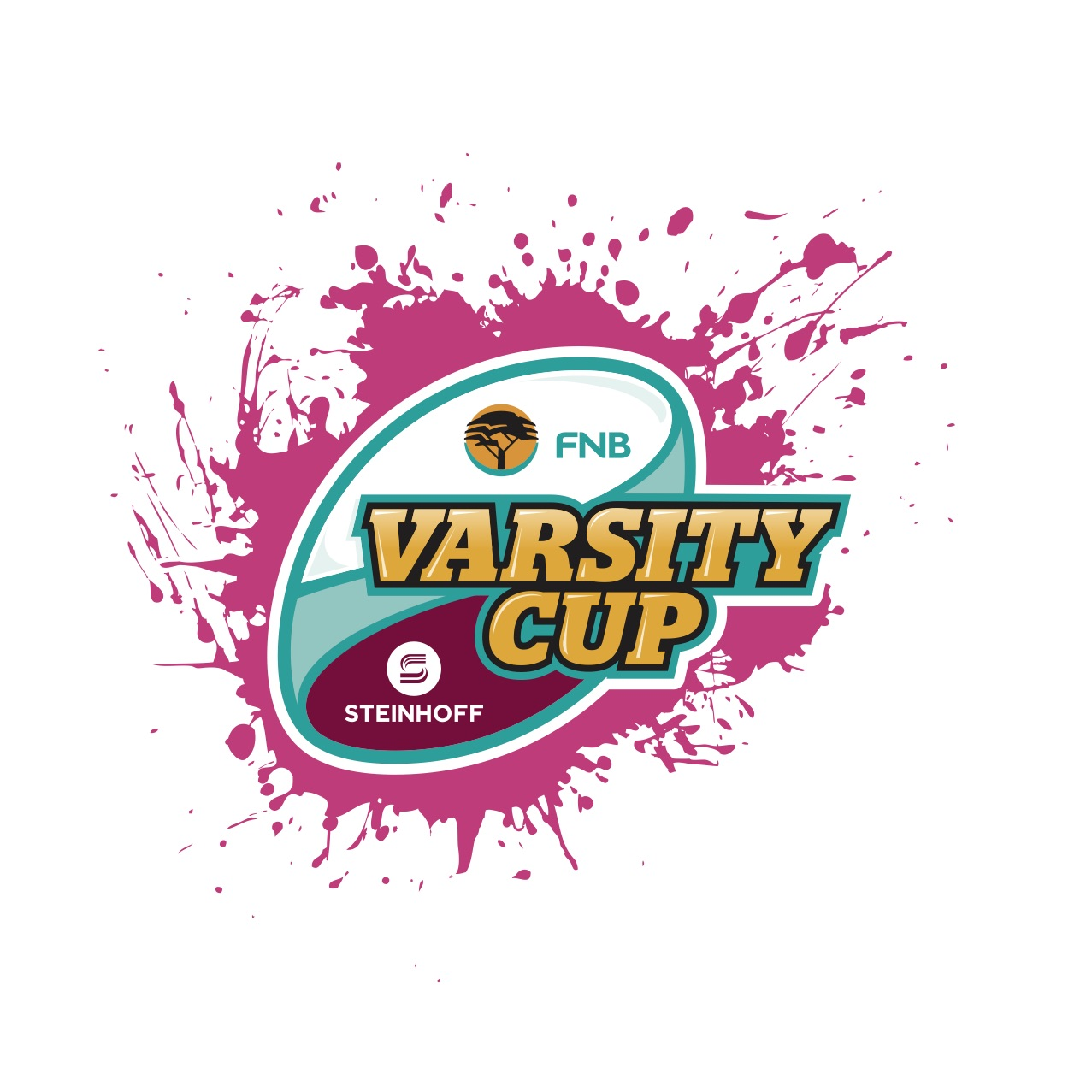
The Varsity Cup logo

The Varsity Cup is the premier Varsity Rugby competition and is contested on an annual basis between the nine foremost university rugby union teams in South Africa. The competition – known as the "FNB Varsity Cup presented by Steinhoff International" for sponsorship reasons – was first held in 2008. It was won by Maties in the first three seasons. Between 2011 and 2014, UCT Ikey Tigers and UP Tuks both won the competition on two occasions, while the only other winner was UFS Shimlas, who won it in 2015.

Those four teams, along with NMMU Madibaz, NWU Eagles, TUT Vikings and UJ, were the founding members of the competition in 2015. All eight those teams took part in every season of the competition, with the exception of the TUT Vikings who were relegated to the Varsity Shield competition at the end of the 2012 competition. Their place was taken by Wits, who took part in 2013 and 2014 before they too were relegated, and CUT Ixias, who took part since 2015.

Between 2008 and 2016, there were eight teams taking part in the competition; this was expanded to nine teams from 2017 onwards. Wits returned to the Varsity Cup for 2017, winning promotion from the 2016 Varsity Shield.

=== Format ===
The tournament starts with a round robin stage, during which all teams play each other once, either home or away. Teams are awarded four points for a win and two points for a draw. Teams may also be awarded bonus points for either scoring four tries in a game, or for losing a match by a margin of seven points or less.

Depending on where the move starts, a team can be awarded nine points for scoring a try. If the move starts within the side's half, that leads to a try being scored without losing possession along the way, an additional two bonus points are awarded, earning them seven points for scoring the try. If the conversion is successful, the try will be worth nine points.

At the end of the round robin stage, the top four teams progress to the semi-finals of the play-off stage. In the semi-finals, the team that finishes first has home advantage against the team that finishes fourth, while the team that finishes second has home advantage against the team that finishes third. The semi-final winners progress to the final, played at the venue of the higher-placed team.

Since the introduction of the Varsity Shield tournament in 2011, a promotion/relegation system between the Varsity Cup and Varsity Shield competitions was also introduced. In 2011, the bottom Varsity Cup side played in a play-off match against the Varsity Shield champions. In 2012, promotion/relegation was changed to a bi-annual process occurring in even-numbered years. The bottom team is automatically relegated to the Varsity Shield and replaced by the champions of the Varsity Shield. In addition, the seventh-placed team will take part in a promotion/relegation play-off against the Varsity Shield runner-up. At the end of the 2016 competition, following a decision to expand the competition to nine teams, the bottom team played in the relegation play-off instead.

=== Teams ===
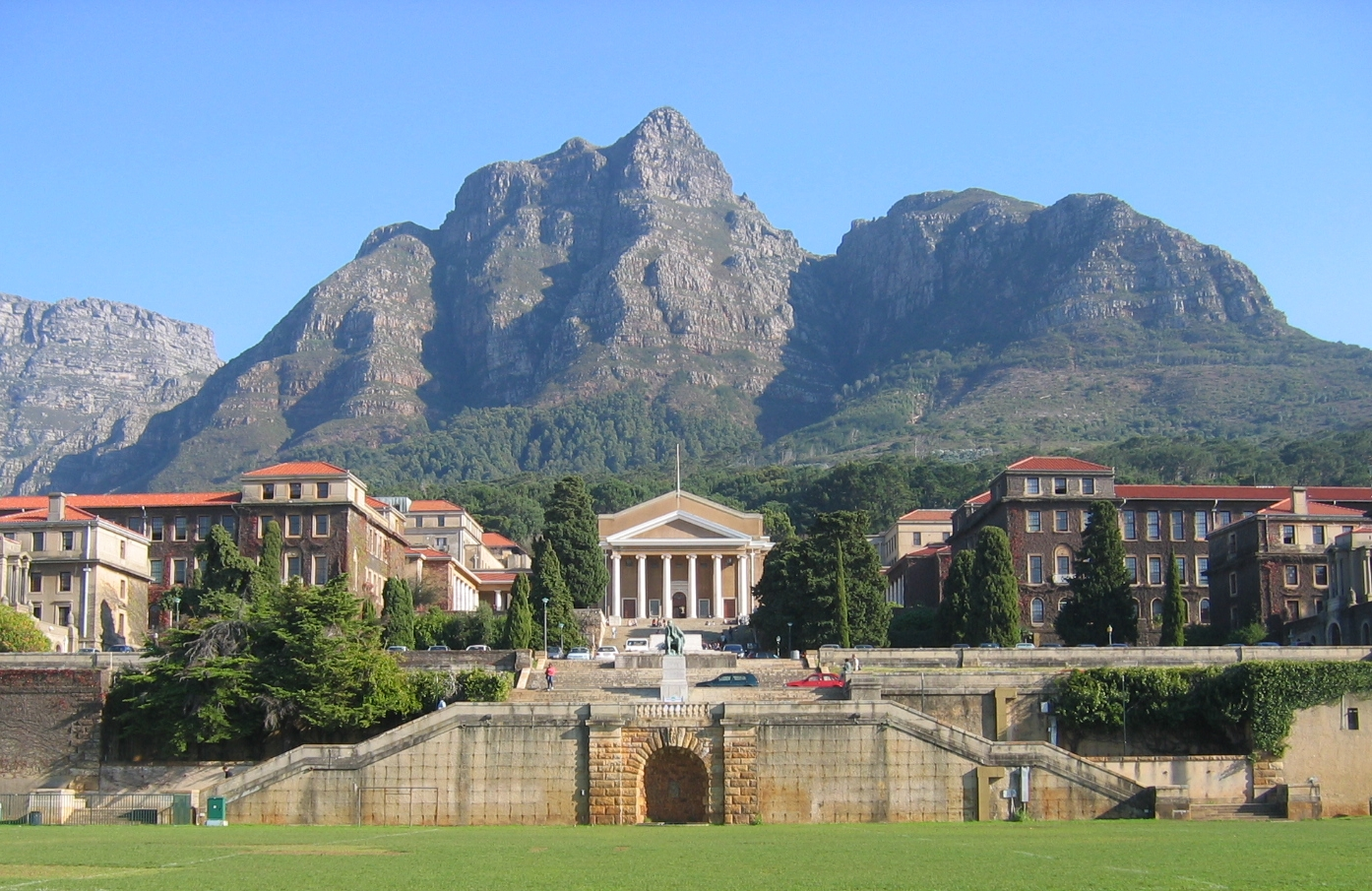
UCT was one of the founder members of the Varsity Cup

The following teams have participated in the Varsity Cup:

Varsity Cup teams
Team	Seasons	Competitions	Champions	Play-offs
CUT Ixias	2015–2026	12	0	0
Emeris	2026	1	0	0
Maties	2008–present	19	5	16
NMU Madibaz	2008–2018, 2021–2022	13	0	2
NWU Eagles	2008–present	19	2	13
TUT Vikings	2008–2012	5	0	0
UCT Ikey Tigers	2008–present	19	3	11
UFS Shimlas	2008–present	19	2	9
UJ	2008–present	19	0	7
UP Tuks	2008–2023; 2025–present	18	6	13
UWC	2019–2022, 2024	5	0	0
Wits	2013–2014, 2017–2025	11	0	1
Updated on 13 April 2026. Includes 2020 season, although no champion was crowned.

=== Seasons ===
Varsity Cup seasons
Year	Winner	Score	Runner-up	Losing semi-finalists	Relegated
2008	Maties	16–10	UCT Ikey Tigers	NWU Pukke, UP Tuks	—N/a
2009	Maties	11–6	NWU Pukke	UCT Ikey Tigers, UP Tuks	—N/a
2010	Maties	17–14	UCT Ikey Tigers	NWU Pukke, UFS Shimlas	—N/a
2011	UCT Ikey Tigers	26–16	UP Tuks	UFS Shimlas, UJ	—N/a
2012	UP Tuks	29–21	Maties	NWU Pukke, UJ	TUT Vikings
2013	UP Tuks	44–5	Maties	NMMU Madibaz, UJ	—N/a
2014	UCT Ikey Tigers	39–33	NWU Pukke	Maties, NMMU Madibaz	Wits
2015	UFS Shimlas	63–33	NWU Pukke	UCT Ikey Tigers, UP Tuks	—N/a
2016	NWU Pukke	7–6	Maties	UJ, UP Tuks	—N/a
2017	UP Tuks	28–21	Maties	UFS Shimlas, UJ	—N/a
2018	Maties	40–7	NWU Pukke	UJ, Wits	NMMU Madibaz
2019	Maties	34–12	UP Tuks	UFS Shimlas, NWU Pukke	—N/a
2021	UP Tuks	34–27	UCT Ikey Tigers	Maties, NWU Eagles	—N/a
2022	UP Tuks	29–23	Maties	UCT Ikey Tigers, UFS Shimlas	—N/a
2023	NWU Eagles	27–25	UCT Ikey Tigers	UFS Shimlas, Maties	UP Tuks
2024	UFS Shimlas	45–42	UCT Ikey Tigers	NWU Eagles, Maties	UWC
2025	UCT Ikey Tigers	44–21	Maties	UFS Shimlas, UP Tuks	Wits
2026	UP Tuks	31–3	NWU Eagles	Maties, UJ	CUT Ixias

=== Team records ===
Team	Champions	Runners-up	Third/Fourth	Apps to knockouts	Relegations
UP Tuks	6 (2012, 2013, 2017, 2021, 2022, 2026)	2 (2011, 2019)	5 (2008, 2009, 2015, 2016, 2025)	13	1 (2023)
Maties	5 (2008, 2009, 2010, 2018, 2019)	6 (2012, 2013, 2016, 2017, 2022, 2025)	5 (2014, 2021, 2023, 2024, 2026)	16	—N/a
UCT Ikey Tigers	3 (2011, 2014, 2025)	5 (2008, 2010, 2021, 2023, 2024)	3 (2009, 2015, 2022)	11	—N/a
NWU Pukke	2 (2016, 2023)	5 (2009, 2014, 2015, 2018, 2026)	6 (2008, 2010, 2012, 2019, 2024)	13	—N/a
UFS Shimlas	2 (2015, 2024)	—N/a	7 (2011, 2012, 2013, 2016, 2017, 2018, 2026)	9	—N/a
UJ	—N/a	—N/a	7 (2010, 2011, 2017, 2019, 2022, 2023, 2025)	7	—N/a
NMMU Madibaz	—N/a	—N/a	2 (2013, 2014)	2	1 (2018)
Wits	—N/a	—N/a	1 (2018)	1	2 (2014, 2025)
UWC	—N/a	—N/a	—N/a	—N/a	1 (2024)
CUT Ixias	—N/a	—N/a	—N/a	—N/a	1 (2026)
TUT Vikings	—N/a	—N/a	—N/a	—N/a	1 (2012)
Emeris	—N/a	—N/a	—N/a	—N/a	—N/a

== Women's Varsity Cup ==
The Women's Varsity Cup tournament's inaugural competition was in 2023. Maties was crowned first-ever Varsity Cup Women’s champions. The Baby Blues of the University of Fort Hare were the 2024 champions.

=== Teams ===
The following teams have participated in the Varsity Cup:

Varsity Cup teams
Team	Seasons	Competitions	Champions	Play-offs
Maties	2023–present	4	2	3
UJ	2023–present	4	0	1
UKZN Impi	2023–present	4	0	1
UFH	2023–present	4	2	3
UP Tuks	2023–present	4	0	3
UWC	2024–present	3	0	1
Updated on 11 April 2026.

=== Seasons ===
Varsity Cup seasons
Year	Winner	Score	Runner-up
2023	Maties	63–9	UJ
2024	UFH	37–31	Maties
2025	Maties	21–10	UP Tuks
2026	UFH	24–21	UWC

== Varsity Shield ==
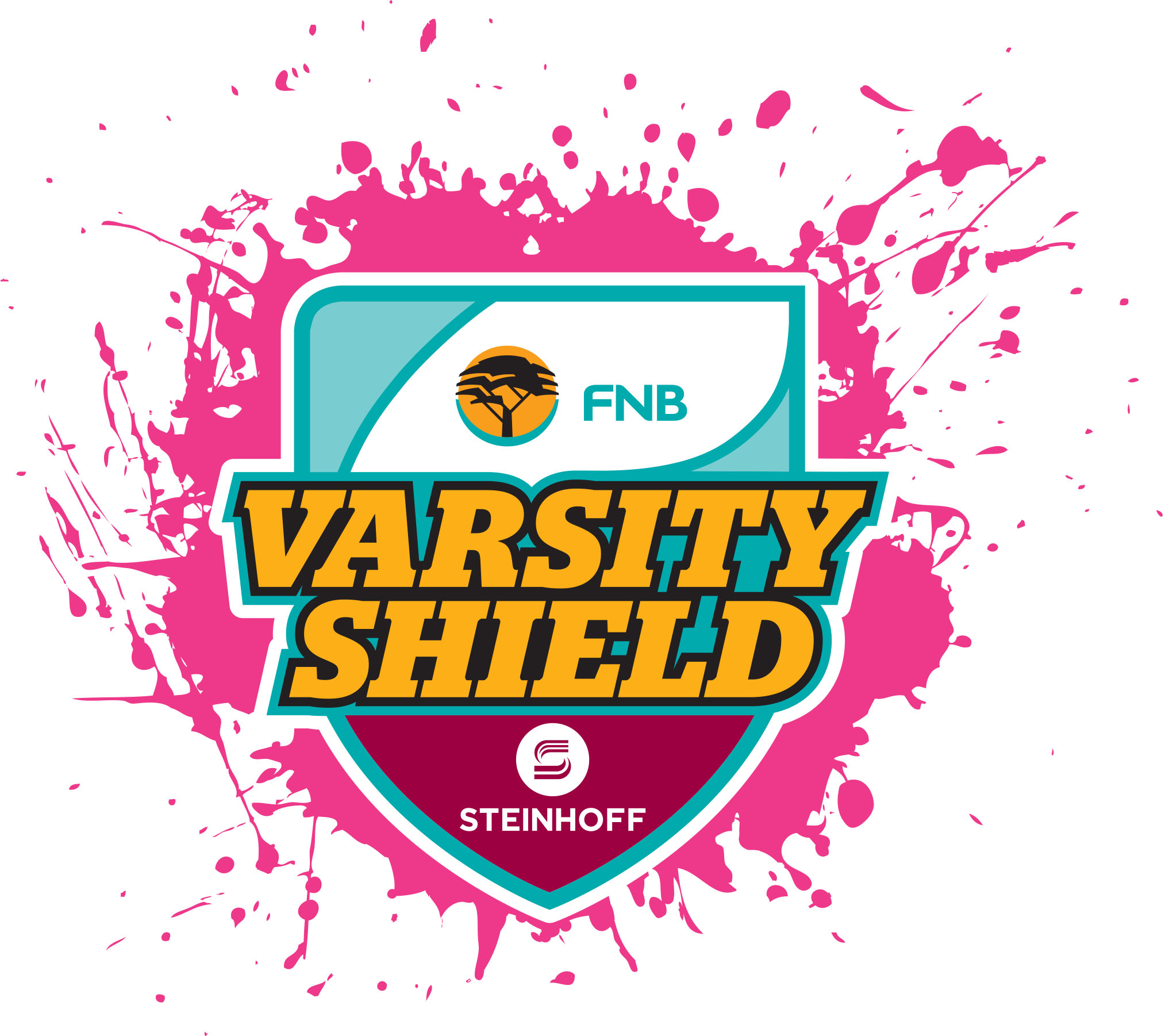
The Varsity Shield logo

The Varsity Shield is the second-tier Varsity Rugby competition and is contested on an annual basis between the five next-best university rugby union teams in South Africa after the eight Varsity Cup teams. The winners of the 2026 Varsity Shield were Wits, who have also been promoted back to the 2027 Varsity Cup. The competition – known as the "FNB Varsity Shield presented by Steinhoff International" for sponsorship reasons – was first held in 2011. The most successful team in the competition to date is CUT Ixias, who won the inaugural competition, and also in 2013 and 2014. Wits won the competition in 2012 before becoming the first team to earn promotion to the Varsity Cup competition for 2013. CUT Ixias also won promotion in 2014, while the 2015 Varsity Shield was won by UKZN Impi for the first time.

Those three teams, along with UFH Blues and UWC were the founding members of the competition in 2011. UFH Blues, UKZN Impi and UWC took part in every season of the competition to date, while TUT Vikings played in the Varsity Shield competition since their relegation from the Varsity Cup in 2012.

=== Format ===
The tournament starts with a round robin stage, during which all teams play each other twice, once at home and once away. Teams are awarded four points for a win and two points for a draw. Teams may also be awarded bonus points for either scoring four tries in a game, or for losing a match by a margin of seven points or less.

Depending on where the move starts, a team can be awarded nine points for scoring a try. If the move starts within the side's half, that leads to a try being scored without losing possession along the way, an additional two bonus points are awarded, earning them seven points for scoring the try. If the conversion is successful, the try will be worth nine points.

At the end of the round robin stage, the top two teams progress to the Varsity Shield final, played at the venue of the higher-placed team.

A promotion/relegation system between the Varsity Shield and Varsity Cup competitions was also introduced since the second tier was added to the competition. In 2011, the Varsity Shield champions played in a play-off match against the bottom Varsity Cup side. In 2012, promotion/relegation was changed to a bi-annual process occurring in even-numbered years. The champions of the Varsity Shield is automatically promoted to the Varsity Cup and replaced by the bottom team from the Varsity Cup. In addition, the Varsity Shield runner-up will take part in a promotion/relegation play-off against the seventh-placed team in the Varsity Cup.

Due to an expansion of Varsity Rugby for 2017, the winner of the 2016 Varsity Shield was automatically promoted, while the runner-up played in a promotion play-off against the bottom team in the Varsity Cup. Three additional universities – CPUT, Rhodes University and WSU All Blacks – joined the Varsity Shield for the first time in 2017.

=== Teams ===
The following teams have participated in the Varsity Shield:

Varsity Shield teams
Team	Seasons	Competitions	Champions	Play-offs
CPUT	2017–present	10	2	4
CUT Ixias	2011–2014	4	3	4
NMU Madibaz	2019, 2023–present	5	0	3
Rhodes	2017–2023	7	0	0
FNB SPU	2025–present	2	0	0
TUT Vikings	2013–2024	12	0	0
UFH Blues	2011–present	16	1	2
UKZN Impi	2011–present	16	1	2
UP Tuks	2024	1	1	1
UWC	2011–2018, 2023, 2025-present	11	3	6
Varsity College	2024-2025	2	1	2
Wits	2011–2012, 2015–2016, 2026	5	3	5
WSU All Blacks	2017–present	10	0	3
Updated on 11 April 2026. Includes 2020 season, although no champion was crowned.

=== Seasons ===
Varsity Shield seasons
Year	Winner	Score	Runner-up	Promoted
2011	CUT Ixias	25–18	Wits	—N/a
2012	Wits	19–17	CUT Ixias	Wits
2013	CUT Ixias	29–19	UWC	—N/a
2014	CUT Ixias	35–26	UKZN Impi	CUT Ixias
2015	UKZN Impi	29–24	Wits	—N/a
2016	Wits	39–2	UWC	Wits
2017	UWC	45–2	UFH Blues	—N/a
2018	UWC	55–10	WSU All Blacks	UWC
2019	CPUT	32–28	NMU	—N/a
2021	CPUT	23–6	WSU All Blacks	—N/a
2022	UFH Blues	28–27	CPUT	—N/a
2023	UWC	24–18	CPUT	UWC
2024	UP Tuks	95–21	Varsity College	UP Tuks
2025	Varsity College	22–7	NMU Madibaz	Varsity College
2026	Wits	44–18	WSU	Wits

== Young Guns ==
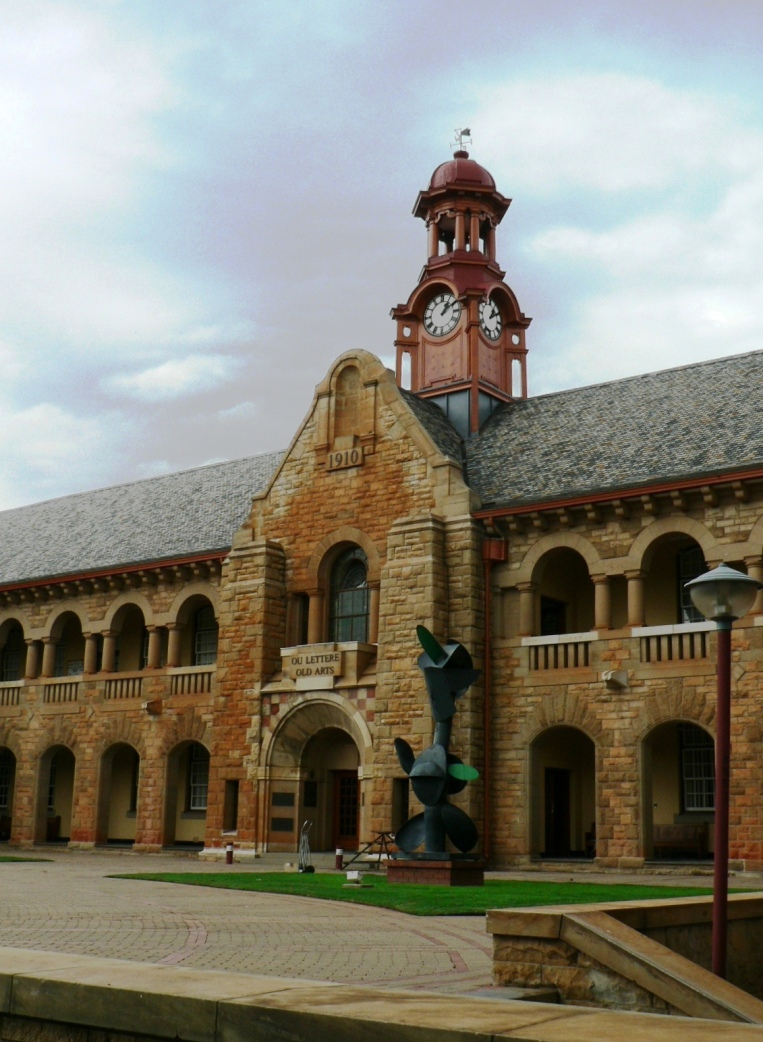
UP Tuks are the most successful team in the Young Guns competition.

The Varsity Rugby Young Guns competition is a youth competition that forms part of Varsity Rugby and is contested on an annual basis between the Under-20 teams of the eight foremost university rugby union teams in South Africa. The competition – known as the "FNB Young Guns presented by Steinhoff International" for sponsorship reasons – was first held in 2012. The most successful team in the competition to date is UP Tuks Young Guns; they won four of the first five competitions and played in the final in 2014, where they only lost to UFS Shimlas Young Guns on a kick-off after the matched finished in a 17–all draw.

Teams are included or excluded from the competition based on the university's first team's performance in the Varsity Cup competition.

=== Format ===
The eight teams are divided into two pools during the group stage. In the first three editions of the competition, teams played the other teams in their pool once, either at home or away, with the top two teams in each pool progressing to the semi-final. In 2015, this was slightly modified so that teams played the teams in the other pool once, either at home or away. This meant each team played in one more match during the pool stage, but led to the semi-finals being scrapped and the top two teams advancing directly to the final.

Teams are awarded four points for a win and two points for a draw. Teams may also be awarded bonus points for either scoring four tries in a game, or for losing a match by a margin of seven points or less.

=== Teams ===
The following teams have participated in the Young Guns competition:

Young Guns teams
Team	Seasons	No of Comps	Champions	Play-offs
CUT Young Guns	2015–2019; 2022–present	10	0	0
Maties Juniors	2012–2019; 2022–present	13	2	8
NMMU Young Guns	2012–2018	7	0	0
NWU Pukke Young Guns	2012–2019; 2022–present	13	2	7
TUT Vikings Young Guns	2012	1	0	0
UCT Trojans	2012–2019; 2022–present	13	1	5
UFS Shimlas Young Guns	2012–2019; 2022–present	13	1	9
UJ Young Guns	2012–2019; 2022–present	13	0	4
UP Tuks Young Guns	2012–2019; 2022–present	13	6	10
Wits Young Guns	2013–2014, 2017–2019; 2022–present	10	1	1
Updated on 14 April 2026.

=== Seasons ===
Young Guns seasons
Year	Winner	Score	Runner-up	Losing semi-finalists
2012	UP Tuks Young Guns	35–26	Maties Juniors	NWU Pukke Young Guns, UFS Shimlas Young Guns
2013	UP Tuks Young Guns	50–21	Maties Juniors	UCT Trojans, UFS Shimlas Young Guns
2014	UFS Shimlas Young Guns	17–17 ^{1}	UP Tuks Young Guns	Maties Juniors, UJ Young Guns
2015	UP Tuks Young Guns	26–13	UFS Shimlas Young Guns	—N/a
2016	UP Tuks Young Guns	47–24	UJ Young Guns	—N/a
2017	UP Tuks Young Guns	42–37	Maties Juniors	UFS Shimlas Young Guns, UJ Young Guns
2018	Maties Juniors	45–37	UP Tuks Young Guns	UFS Shimlas Young Guns, NWU Pukke Young Guns
2019	Maties Juniors	32–22	NWU Eagles Young Guns	UCT Trojans, UP Tuks Young Guns
2022	UP Tuks Young Guns	22–14	NWU Eagles Young Guns	Maties Juniors, UCT Trojans
2023	NWU Eagles Young Guns	27–26	Maties Juniors	UFS Shimlas Young Guns, Wits Young Guns
2024	NWU Eagles Young Guns	39–36	UFS Shimlas Young Guns	UCT Trojans, Maties Juniors
2025	Wits Young Guns	18–03	UCT Trojans	NWU Eagles Young Guns, UFS Shimlas Young Guns
2026	UCT Trojans	42-29	UFS Shimlas Young Guns	UJ Young Guns, UP Tuks Young Guns
^{1} The UFS Shimlas Young Guns beat UP Tuks Young Guns in a kick-off following a 17–17 draw in the 2014 final.

== Res Rugby ==
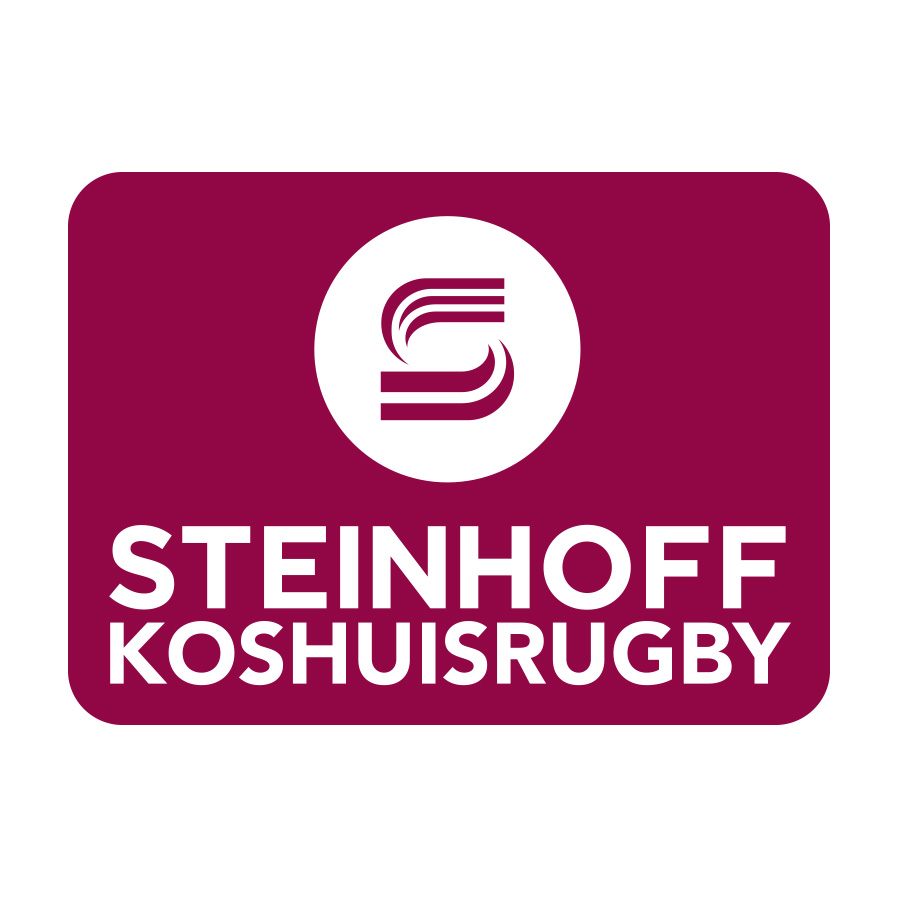
The Koshuis Rugby Championship logo

The Res Rugby competition — known as the Koshuis Rugby Championship from 2008 to 2017 — is a competition that forms part of Varsity Rugby and is contested on an annual basis between the winning university residence (koshuis) teams of the nine foremost university rugby union teams in South Africa. The competition was first held in 2008, the same year the first Varsity Cup was also held. The most successful team in the competition to date is University of the Free State koshuis Vishuis, who won the competition on four occasions. The University of the Free State produced the winning koshuis for six competitions, with Huis Armentum, Dagbreek (SU), Heimat also winning the competition.

Teams are included or excluded from the competition based on the university's first team's performance in the Varsity Cup competition.

=== Format ===
The eight teams are divided into two pools during the group stage. In the first seven editions of the competition, teams played the other teams in their pool once, either at home or away, with the top two teams in each pool progressing to the semi-final. In 2015, this was slightly modified so that teams played the teams in the other pool once, either at home or away. This meant each team played in one more match during the pool stage, but led to the semi-finals being scrapped and the top two teams advancing directly to the final.

Teams are awarded four points for a win and two points for a draw. Teams may also be awarded bonus points for either scoring four tries in a game, or for losing a match by a margin of seven points or less.

=== Teams ===
The following teams have participated in the play-off stages of the Res Rugby competition: (Note: One losing semi-finalist in the 2008 Koshuis Rugby Championship is unknown.)

Res Rugby play-off record
Team	University	Play-off years	Champions	Play-offs apps
Barbarians	Nelson Mandela Metropolitan University	2009	0	1
Bastion	University of Johannesburg	2013	0	1
Cobras	University of Cape Town	2012, 2014	0	2
Dagbreek	Stellenbosch University	2008, 2010, 2012	1	3
Dromedaris	University of Johannesburg	2008–2009	0	2
Heimat	University of the Free State	2014	1	1
Huis Armentum	University of the Free State	2009	1	1
Maroela	University of Pretoria	2008–2010	0	3
Medies	Stellenbosch University	2013–2014	0	2
Mopanie	University of Pretoria	2015	1	1
Northernz	Nelson Mandela Metropolitan University	2011	0	1
Patria	North-West University	2011–12, 2014, 2016–2018	1	6
Simonsberg	Stellenbosch University	2011	0	1
Tornadoes	University of Cape Town	2011	0	1
Villagers	North-West University	2010, 2013	0	2
Vishuis	University of the Free State	2010, 2012–2013, 2015–2018	6	7

Res Rugby play-off record by university
University	Play-off years	Champions	Play-offs apps
Nelson Mandela Metropolitan University	2009, 2011	0	2
North-West University	2010–2014, 2016–2017	1	8
Stellenbosch University	2008, 2010–2014	1	6
University of Johannesburg	2008–2009, 2013	0	3
University of Cape Town	2011–2012, 2014	0	3
University of the Free State	2009–2010, 2012–2017	8	9
University of Pretoria	2008–2010, 2015	1	4
Correct as of the end of the 2019 season.

=== Seasons ===
Res Rugby Championship seasons
Year	Winner	Score	Runner-up	Losing semi-finalists
2008	Dagbreek (SU)	22–14	Maroela (UP)	Dromedaris (UJ), to be confirmed
2009	Huis Armentum (UFS)	30–16	Dromedaris (UJ)	Barbarians (NMMU), Maroela (UP)
2010	Vishuis (UFS)	22–7	Dagbreek (SU)	Maroela (UP), Villagers (NWU)
2011	Patria (NWU)	21–0	Simonsberg (SU)	Northernz (NMMU), Tornadoes (UCT)
2012	Vishuis (UFS)	44–26	Dagbreek (SU)	Cobras (UCT), Patria (NWU)
2013	Vishuis (UFS)	20–16	Villagers (NWU)	Bastion (UJ), Medies (SU)
2014	Heimat (UFS)	20–12	Patria (NWU)	Cobras (UCT), Medies (SU)
2015	Mopanie (UP)	29–23	Vishuis (UFS)	—N/a
2016	Vishuis (UFS)	37–29	Patria (NWU)	—N/a
2017	Vishuis (UFS)	25–10	Patria (NWU)	—N/a
2018	Vishuis (UFS)	55–29	Patria (NWU)	—N/a
2019	Patria (NWU)	16-08	Vishuis (UFS)	—N/a
2021	TBC	–	TBC	—N/a
2022	TBC	–	TBC	—N/a
2023	TBC	–	TBC	—N/a
2023	TBC	–	TBC	—N/a
2024	Mopanie (UP)	tbc	Ekhaya (UP)	—N/a
2025	Caput (NWU)	18-14 (tbc)	Heimat (UFS)	—N/a
University abbreviations: NMMU = Nelson Mandela Metropolitan University, NWU = North-West University, SU = Stellenbosch University, UCT = University of Cape Town, UFS = University of the Free State, UJ = University of Johannesburg, UP = University of Pretoria

== Controversies ==
The Rugby Transformation Coalition has called for a boycott of the Varsity Cup. This is due to the exclusion of formerly black universities, and the low representation of black players.

Varsity Cup universities has faced accusations of professionalism, and breaking eligibility rules. The punishments handed to guilty teams have also been seen as lenient.

The practice of charging students for tickets, as well as the prices set, have been a point of contention. This led to an SMS campaign against the University of Pretoria.

No private universities have been allowed to compete in the tournament, leading to complaints from Varsity College.

== Sponsors ==
The tournament's current primary sponsors are:

- First National Bank
- Steers

== See also ==
- Varsity Sports
- BUCS Super Rugby
