= 2024 Varsity Cup =

South African college rugby competition

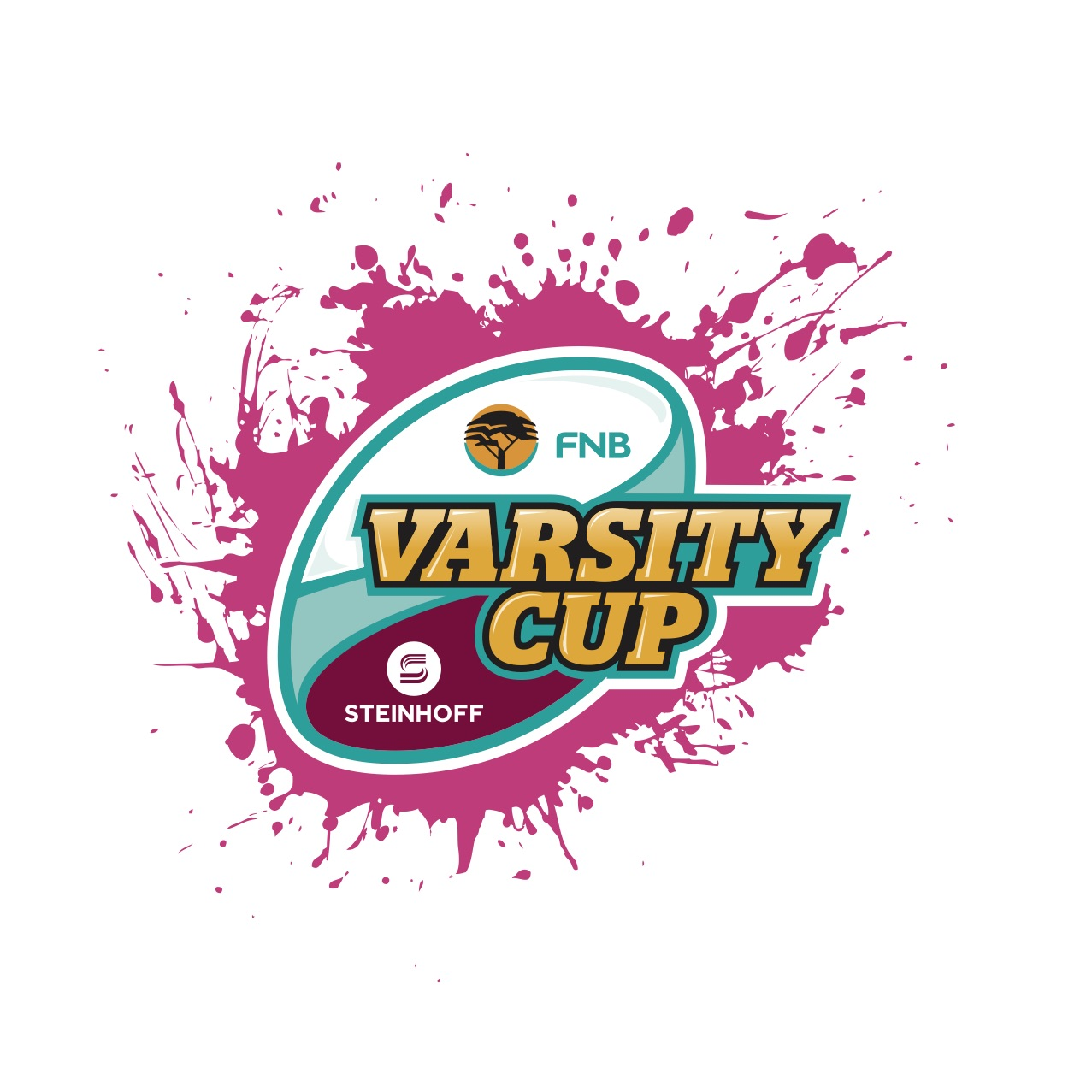
- Countries: South Africa
- Date: 19 February – 22 April 2024
- Champions: UFS Shimlas (2nd title)
- Runners-up: UCT Ikey Tigers
- Promoted: UP Tuks
- Relegated: Wits
- Matches played: 59
- Top point scorer: Ntokozo Makhaza (134 - UCT Ikey Tigers)
- Top try scorer: Dewet Marais (9 - Maties)

Official website
- varsitycup.co.za

The 2024 Varsity Cup was the 17th season of the Varsity Cup, the top competition in the annual Varsity Rugby series for men's rugby union. It was played between 19 February and 22 April 2024 and featured eight university teams.

The 2024 Varsity Cup saw a final in Bloemfontein, where the FNB UFS Shimlas were crowned champions after a 45–42 victory over the FNB UCT Ikey Tigers, sealed by a last‑minute penalty. The competition featured high‑scoring matches and standout individual performances, and saw UCT’s Ntokozo Makhaza finish the season as one of its most prolific points scorers, earning recognition despite UCT falling just short in the final. The 2024 edition was widely regarded for its competitive league phase and showcased several tight fixtures that highlighted the growing depth across participating university squads.

== Competition rules and information ==
There were eight participating university teams in the 2024 Varsity Cup. They played each other once during the pool stage, either at home or away. Teams received four points for a win and two points for a draw. Bonus points were awarded to teams that scored four or more tries in a game, as well as to teams that lost a match by seven points or less. Teams were ranked by log points, then points difference (points scored less points conceded).

The top four teams after the pool stage qualified for the semifinals, which were followed by a final.

== Teams ==
Location of teams in the 2024 Varsity Cup
Western Cape

The teams that played in the 2024 Varsity Cup are:

2024 Varsity Cup teams
Team name	University	Stadium
NWU Eagles	North-West University	Fanie du Toit Sport Ground, Potchefstroom
Maties	Stellenbosch University	Danie Craven Stadium, Stellenbosch
UFS Shimlas	University of the Free State	Shimla Park, Bloemfontein
UCT Ikey Tigers	University of Cape Town	UCT Rugby Fields, Cape Town
Wits	University of the Witwatersrand	Wits Rugby Stadium, Johannesburg
UJ	University of Johannesburg	UJ Stadium, Johannesburg
CUT Ixias	Central University of Technology	CUT Stadium, Bloemfontein
UWC	University of Western Cape	UWC Sport Stadium, Cape Town

== Standings ==
The final log for the 2024 Varsity Cup was:

2024 Varsity Cup log
Pos	Team	P	W	D	L	PF	PA	PD	TB	LB	Pts
1	NWU Eagles	7	6	0	1	281	160	+121	4	0	28
2	Maties	7	6	0	1	231	130	+101	2	0	26
3	UFS Shimlas	7	5	0	2	261	211	+50	4	1	25
4	UCT Ikey Tigers	7	4	1	2	266	147	+119	2	1	21
5	Wits	7	2	1	4	205	207	−2	3	0	13
6	UJ	7	2	0	5	213	226	−13	3	2	13
7	CUT Ixias	7	2	0	5	191	256	−65	2	2	12
8	UWC	7	0	0	7	103	414	−311	0	0	0

Legend and competition rules
Legend:
Qualified for the semifinals.	P = Games played, W = Games won, D = Games drawn, L = Games lost, PF = Points for, PA = Points against, PD = Points difference, TF = Tries for, TA = Tries against, TB = Try bonus points, LB = Losing bonus points, Pts = Log points
Competition rules:
Qualification: The top four teams qualified for the semifinals. Points breakdown: * 4 points for a win * 2 points for a draw * 1 bonus point for a loss by seven points or less * 1 bonus point for scoring four or more tries in a match

== Pool stage ==
=== Matches ===
The following matches were played in the 2024 Varsity Cup:

==== Round one ====
19 February 2024	UFS Shimlas	32–38	UCT Ikey Tigers	Shimla Park, Bloemfontein
14:45		Report

19 February 2024	CUT Ixias	23–19	UJ	CUT Stadium, Bloemfontein
17:00		Report

19 February 2024	Maties	12–23	NWU Eagles	Danie Craven Stadium, Stellenbosch
17:00		Report

19 February 2024	UWC	10–66	Wits	UWC Sport Stadium, Cape Town
17:00		Report

==== Round two ====
26 February 2024	UJ	31–34	UFS Shimlas	UJ Stadium, Johannesburg
14:45		Report

26 February 2024	NWU Eagles	49–15	UWC	Fanie du Toit Sport Ground, Potchefstroom
17:00		Report

26 February 2024	UCT Ikey Tigers	10–15	Maties	UCT Rugby Fields, Cape Town
17:00		Report

26 February 2024	Wits	34–17	CUT Ixias	Wits Rugby Stadium, Johannesburg
17:00		Report

==== Round three ====
4 March 2024	UWC	21–38	CUT Ixias	UWC Sport Stadium, Cape Town
14:45		Report

4 March 2024	Maties	23–12	Wits	Danie Craven Stadium, Stellenbosch
17:00		Report

4 March 2024	UCT Ikey Tigers	32–21	UJ	UCT Rugby Fields, Cape Town
17:00		Report

4 March 2024	UFS Shimlas	35–26	NWU Eagles	Shimla Park, Bloemfontein
17:00		Report

==== Round four ====
11 March 2024	NWU Eagles	51–22	Wits	Fanie du Toit Sport Ground, Potchefstroom
14:45		Report

11 March 2024	Maties	54–22	UJ	Danie Craven Stadium, Stellenbosch
17:00		Report

11 March 2024	UCT Ikey Tigers	44–7	CUT Ixias	UCT Rugby Fields, Cape Town
17:00		Report

11 March 2024	UFS Shimlas	48–26	UWC	Shimla Park, Bloemfontein
17:00		Report

==== Round five ====
18 March 2024	Wits	33–33	UCT Ikey Tigers	Wits Rugby Stadium, Johannesburg
14:45		Report

18 March 2024	CUT Ixias	40–59	UFS Shimlas	CUT Stadium, Bloemfontein
17:00		Report

18 March 2024	UJ	12–49	NWU Eagles	UJ Stadium, Johannesburg
17:00		Report

18 March 2024	UWC	14–63	Maties	UWC Sport Stadium, Cape Town
17:00		Report

==== Round six ====
25 March 2024	UWC	9–91	UCT Ikey Tigers	UCT Rugby Fields, Cape Town
14:45		Report

25 March 2024	CUT Ixias	46–53	NWU Eagles	CUT Stadium, Bloemfontein
17:00		Report

25 March 2024	UFS Shimlas	29–38	Maties	Shimla Park, Bloemfontein
17:00		Report

25 March 2024	UJ	49–26	Wits	UJ Stadium, Johannesburg
17:00		Report

==== Round seven ====
8 April 2024	Wits	12–24	UFS Shimlas	Wits Rugby Stadium, Johannesburg
14:00		Report

8 April 2024	CUT Ixias	20–26	Maties	CUT Stadium, Bloemfontein
14:45		Report

8 April 2024	NWU Eagles	30–18	UCT Ikey Tigers	Fanie du Toit Sport Ground, Potchefstroom
17:00		Report

8 April 2024	UJ	59–8	UWC	UJ Stadium, Johannesburg
17:00		Report

== Play-offs ==
Semi-finals
15 April 2024
Maties	24
UFS Shimlas	38
15 April 2024
NWU Eagles	18
UCT Ikey Tigers	32

Final
22 April 2024
UFS Shimlas	45
UCT Ikey Tigers	42

=== Semi-finals ===
15 April 2024
14:45

Maties	24–38	UFS Shimlas
Try: Kitshoff; Ngobeni; Topley; Burton; Con: Mostert (2)	Report	Try: Uys; Annies; Kunene (2); Volschenk; Bester; Con: Wentzel (2); Pen: Wentzel (p)

Danie Craven Stadium, Stellenbosch
FNB Player That Rocks - Asanda Kunene, UFS Shimlas
Attendance: 10,000 +
Referee: Hanru van Rooyen

15 April 2024
17:00

NWU Eagles	18-32	UCT Ikey Tigers
Try: Van Zyl; Kubheka; Clack; Drop: Robinson	Report	Try: Duran KoevortKoevort (2); Schubert; Pen: Makhaza (p) (5)

Fanie du Toit Sport Ground, Potchefstroom
FNB Player That Rocks - Reynhardt Crous, UCT Ikey Tigers
Attendance: 5,000 +
Referee: Sean Muller

=== Final ===
22 April 2025
17:00

UFS Shimlas	45–42	UCT Ikey Tigers
Try: Nel 14', 43'; Mgwigwi 18', 40'; Wentzel 35'; Zondani 53'; Con: Wentzel 19', 36', 40', 44'; Pen: Wentzel (83 p)	Report	Try: Blanckenberg 3'; Roche 7'; Louw 26'; Koevort 37'; Le Roux 77'; Con: Makhaza 4', 8', 27'; Pen: Makhaza (29 p), (47 p), (60 p); Cards: Van Rhyn (yellow card) 42'

Shimla Park, Bloemfontein
FNB Player That Rocks - Jandre Nel
Attendance: 5,000 +
Referee: Dylen November

Shimlas	UCT

FB	15	Michael Annies
RW	14	Siviwe Zondani
OC	13	Nkoka Ngobe
IC	12	Zane Bester
LW	11	Asanda Kunene
FH	10	Ethan Wentzel
SH	9	Jandre Nel
N8	8	Kwezi Dlamini
OF	7	Pierre Uys (c)
BF	6	Siyambuka Ningiza
RL	5	Johnre Stopforth
LL	4	Reinier Viljoen
TP	3	Frankie Dos Reis
HK	2	Liyema Mgwigwi
LP	1	Ntokozo Hlophe
Replacements:
	16	Vice Hofmeyr
	17	Conley Pieterse
	18	Okkie Van Der Merwe
	19	Henri van Heerden
	20	Neels Volschenk
	21	Khanyisa Joni
	22	Stiaan Genis
	23	Avuyile Macebe
Coach:
André Tredoux

FB	15	Duran Rayn Koevort
RW	14	Rethabile Louw
OC	13	Joshua Boulle
IC	12	Jonathan Roche
LW	11	Ntokozo Makhaza
FH	10	Alex vermeulen
SH	9	Asad Moos
N8	8	Ruan Delport
OF	7	Taariq Kruger
BF	6	Siphomezo Dyonase
RL	5	Johan van Rhyn (c)
LL	4	Reynhardt Crous
TP	3	John-Kelly Okonkwo
HK	2	Keagan Blanckenberg
LP	1	Luthando Woji
Replacements:
	16	J Lombard
	17	M Khuzwayo
	18	Bryan le Roux
	19	Mika Schubert
	20	Wandile Mlaba
	21	Riaan Genis
	22	Kian Davis
	23	Jason Macleod-Smith
Coach:
Robbie Fleck

Player of the Match:
Jandre Nel UFS Shimlas

Assistant referees:
Hanru van Rooyen (South Africa), Jonathan Lottering (South Africa)
Television match official:
Egon Seconds (South Africa)

== Honours ==
The honour roll for the 2024 Varsity Cup was as follows:

2024 Varsity Cup Honours
Champions:	UFS Shimlas (2nd title)
Player That Rocks:	Ntokozo Makhaza, UCT Ikey Tigers
Forward That Rocks:	Enos Ndiao, UCT Ikey Tigers
Back That Rocks:	Matthew Fortuin, NWU Eagles
Rookie of the year:	Likhona Finca, UJ
Top Points Scorer:	Ntokozo Makhaza, UCT Ikey Tigers (134)
Top Try Scorer:	Dewet Marais, Maties (9)
