= 2010 Varsity Cup =

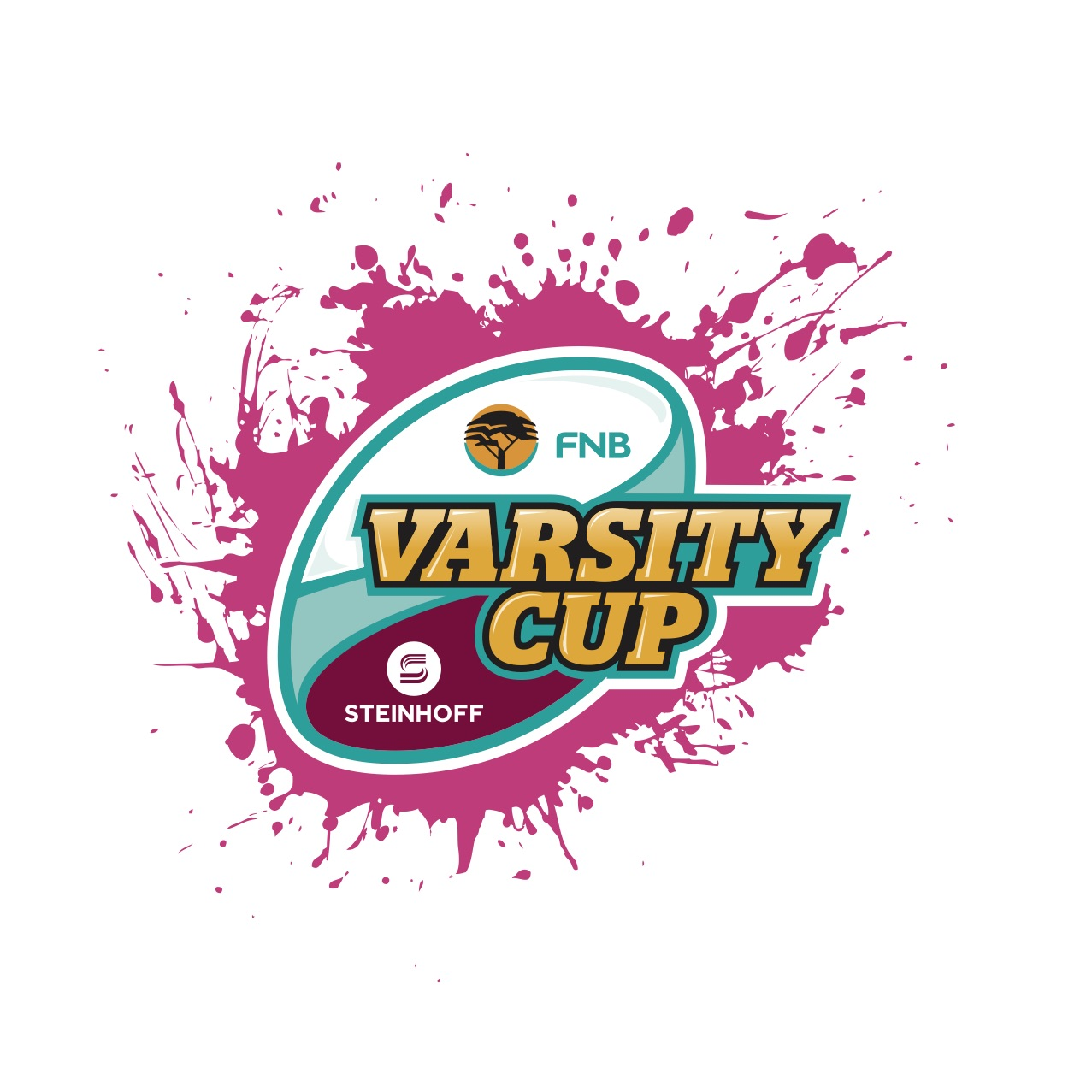
- Countries: South Africa
- Date: 1 February – 29 March 2010
- Champions: Maties (3rd title)
- Runners-up: UCT Ikey Tigers
- Matches played: 31
- Tries scored: 227 (average 7.3 per match)
- Top point scorer: Theuns Kotzé (77)
- Top try scorer: Boom Prinsloo / Lolo Waka (9)

The 2010 Varsity Cup was contested from 1 February to 29 March 2010. The tournament (also known as the FNB Varsity Cup presented by Steinhoff International for sponsorship reasons) was the third season of the Varsity Cup, an annual inter-university rugby union competition featuring eight South African universities.

The tournament was won by Maties for the third consecutive season; they beat UCT Ikey Tigers 17-14 in the final played on 29 March 2010.

== Competition rules ==
There were eight participating universities in the 2010 Varsity Cup. These teams played each other once over the course of the season, either home or away.

Teams received four points for a win and two points for a draw. Bonus points were awarded to teams that scored four or more tries in a game, as well as to teams that lost a match by seven points or less. Teams were ranked by log points, then points difference (points scored less points conceded).

The top four teams qualified for the Title Play-offs. In the semi-finals, the team that finished first had home advantage against the team that finished fourth, while the team that finished second had home advantage against the team that finished third. The winners of these semi-finals will play each other in the final, at the home venue of the higher-placed team.

== Teams ==
Location of teams in the 2010 Varsity Cup

The following teams took part in the 2010 Varsity Cup competition:

2010 Varsity Cup teams
Team Name	University	Stadium
Maties	Stellenbosch University	Danie Craven Stadium, Stellenbosch
NMMU Madibaz	Nelson Mandela Metropolitan University	NMMU Stadium, Port Elizabeth
NWU Pukke	North-West University	Fanie du Toit Sport Ground, Potchefstroom
TUT Vikings	Tshwane University of Technology	TUT Stadium, Pretoria
UCT Ikey Tigers	University of Cape Town	UCT Rugby Fields, Cape Town
UFS Shimlas	University of the Free State	Shimla Park, Bloemfontein
UP Tuks	University of Pretoria	LC de Villiers Stadium, Pretoria
UJ	University of Johannesburg	UJ Stadium, Johannesburg

== Table ==
Pos	Team	Pld	W	D	L	PF	PA	PD	TF	TA	TB	LB	Pts	Qualification
1	Maties	7	7	0	0	324	96	+228	41	12	5	0	33	Title Play-Off Semi-final game
2	UCT Ikey Tigers	7	5	1	1	223	139	+84	24	13	2	1	25	Title Play-Off Semi-final game
3	UFS Shimlas	7	4	1	2	230	169	+61	29	18	4	1	23	Title Play-Off Semi-final game
4	NWU Pukke	7	4	0	3	184	155	+29	23	14	3	2	21	Title Play-Off Semi-final game
5	UJ	7	3	1	3	247	208	+39	32	25	4	1	19	
6	UP Tuks	7	2	1	4	227	264	−37	29	30	3	1	14	
7	TUT Vikings	7	1	0	6	156	285	−129	16	33	1	2	7	
8	NMMU Madibaz	7	0	0	7	148	423	−275	13	62	1	2	3	

Rules for classification:
- 4 points for a win
- 2 points for a draw
- 1 bonus point for a loss by seven points or less
- 1 bonus point for scoring four or more tries in a match

== Fixtures and results ==
- All times are South African (GMT+2)

=== Regular season ===
==== Week One ====
2010-02-01	UFS Shimlas	30 - 30	UCT Ikey Tigers	Xerox NMMU Stadium
		Scoreboard

2010-02-01	NMMU Madibaz	20 - 68	Maties	Xerox NMMU Stadium
		Scoreboard

2010-02-01	TUT Vikings	14 - 28	UJ	LC de Villiers Stadium
		Scoreboard

2010-02-01	UP Tuks	24 - 35	NWU Pukke	LC de Villiers Stadium
		Scoreboard

==== Week Two ====
2010-02-08	Maties	62 - 0	TUT Vikings	Danie Craven Stadium
		Scoreboard

2010-02-08	UFS Shimlas	54 - 5	NMMU Madibaz	Shimla Park
		Scoreboard

2010-02-08	UCT Ikey Tigers	18 - 11	NWU Pukke	Groote Schuur
		Scoreboard

2010-02-08	UP Tuks	34 - 34	UJ	Tuks Rugby Stadium
		Scoreboard

==== Week Three ====
2010-02-15	UJ	10 - 43	Maties	UJ Stadium
		Scoreboard

2010-02-15	NWU Pukke	17 - 16	UFS Shimlas	Fanie du Toit Sports Grounds
		Scoreboard

2010-02-15	NMMU Madibaz	9 - 65	UCT Ikey Tigers	Xerox NMMU Stadium
		Scoreboard

2010-02-15	TUT Vikings	30 - 42	UP Tuks	TUT Stadium
		Scoreboard

==== Week Four ====
2010-02-22	Maties	31 - 15	UFS Shimlas	Danie Craven Stadium
		Scoreboard

2010-02-22	UCT Ikey Tigers	25 - 19	TUT Vikings	Groote Schuur
		Scoreboard

2010-02-22	NWU Pukke	22 - 23	UJ	Fanie du Toit Sports Grounds
		Scoreboard

2010-02-22	UP Tuks	63 - 36	NMMU Madibaz	LC de Villiers Stadium
		Scoreboard

==== Week Five ====
2010-03-01	UJ	23 - 30	UCT Ikey Tigers	UJ Stadium
		Scoreboard

2010-03-01	NMMU Madibaz	24 - 31	NWU Pukke	Xerox NMMU Stadium
		Scoreboard

2010-03-01	UFS Shimlas	37 - 31	TUT Vikings	Shimla Park
		Scoreboard

2010-03-01	Maties	64 - 17	UP Tuks	Danie Craven Stadium
		Scoreboard

==== Week Six ====
2010-03-08	UP Tuks	23 - 27	UFS Shimlas	LC de Villiers Stadium
		Scoreboard

2010-03-08	NWU Pukke	51 - 17	TUT Vikings	Fanie du Toit Sports Grounds
		Scoreboard

2010-03-08	UJ	97 - 14	NMMU Madibaz	UJ Stadium
		Scoreboard

2010-03-08	Maties	23 - 17	UCT Ikey Tigers	Danie Craven Stadium
		Scoreboard

==== Week Seven ====
2010-03-15	UCT Ikey Tigers	38 - 24	UP Tuks	Groote Schuur
		Scoreboard

2010-03-15	UFS Shimlas	51 - 32	UJ	Shimla Park
		Scoreboard

2010-03-15	TUT Vikings	45 - 40	NMMU Madibaz	TUT Stadium
		Scoreboard

2010-03-15	NWU Pukke	17 - 33	Maties	Fanie du Toit Sports Grounds
		Scoreboard

=== Title Play-Off Games ===
==== Play-off games ====
Semi-finals
22 March 2010
UCT Ikey Tigers	27
UFS Shimlas	21
22 March 2010
Maties	47
NWU Pukke	11

Final
29 March 2010
Maties	17
UCT Ikey Tigers	14

==== Semi-finals ====
2010-03-22

UCT Ikey Tigers	27 - 21	UFS Shimlas
	Scoreboard

Groote Schuur

2010-03-22

Maties	47 - 11	NWU Pukke
	Scoreboard

Danie Craven Stadium

==== Final ====
2010-03-29

Maties	17 - 14	UCT Ikey Tigers
	Scoreboard

Danie Craven Stadium
Referee: Tiaan Jonker

Maties	UCT

FB	15	Adnaan Oesman
RW	14	Wilhelm Loock
OC	13	Daniel Poolman
IC	12	Charl Weideman
LW	11	Tythan Adams
FH	10	Andre Kemp
SH	9	Johan Herbst
N8	8	Josh Strauss
OF	7	Jonathan Adendorf
BF	6	Sam Mabombo
RL	5	Hugo Kloppers
LL	4	Andrew Prior
TP	3	Lourens Adriaanse (c)
HK	2	Matthew Dobson
LP	1	Johan Roets
Replacements:
	16	Gareth Light
	17	Mike De Neuilly-Rice
	18	Marinus Pretorius
	19	Cameron Peverett
	20	Johan Laker
	21	Hayden Groepes
	22	Jonathan Francke
	23	Andrew Crausaz
Coach:
Chean Roux

FB	15	Therlow Pietersen
RW	14	Pete Haw
OC	13	Marcel Brache
IC	12	Sean van Tonder
LW	11	Marcello Sampson
FH	10	Douglas Mallett
SH	9	Stu Commins (vc)
N8	8	JJ Gagiano
OF	7	Mike Morris
BF	6	Nick Fenton-Wells (c)
RL	5	Donovan Armand
LL	4	Levi Odendaal
TP	3	Grant Kemp
HK	2	Mark Goosen
LP	1	Ash Wells
Replacements:
	16	Matt Page
	17	Chris Heiberg
	18	Mike Ledwidge
	19	Sam Peter
	20	Nic Groom
	21	Matt Rosslee
	22	Mark Esterhuizen
	23	Wesley Chetty
Coach:
John Dobson

== Honours ==
2010 Varsity Cup Honours
Champions:	Maties (3rd Title)
Player of the Year:	Boom Prinsloo, UFS Shimlas
Forward of the Year:	Lourens Adriaanse, Maties
Back of the Year:	Andries Mahoney, NWU Pukke

== See also ==
- Varsity Cup
