= Vernon Paulo =

South African rugby union player

- Born: 16 July 2001 (age 25) Riversdale, South Africa
- Height: 178 cm (5 ft 10 in)
- Weight: 112 kg (247 lb; 17 st 9 lb)
- School: Hoër Landbouskool Oakdale
- University: North-West University

Rugby union career
- Position: Hooker
- Current team: Stormers
Senior career
Years	Team	Apps	(Points)
2023	Leopards		
2023–2026	Cheetahs	6	(0)
2026–	Stormers	2	(5)
- Correct as of 3 October 2026

Vernon Paulo (born 16 July 2001) is a South African rugby union player, who plays for the Stormers. His preferred position is hooker.

== Early career ==
Paulo was born Riversdale. He attended Oakdale school where he played rugby, earning selection for the SWD Eagles franchise U18 side at Craven Week in 2018. After leaving school he attended North-West University, winning player of the year for the side in 2023 having been top try scorer in the 2023 Varsity Cup. He is nicknamed 'War Dog'.

== Professional career ==
Paulo joined the Leopards franchise after leaving NWU, representing the side in the 2023 Currie Cup First Division. In November 2023, he joined the Cheetahs, debuting for the side in the 2024 Currie Cup Premier Division. He represented the Cheetahs again in the 2025 addition, while also competing for the side in the 2024–25 EPCR Challenge Cup & 2025–26 EPCR Challenge Cup. In February 2026, he signed for the Stormers, representing the Stormers XXIII side in the 2026 Currie Cup Premier Division. In September 2026, he debuted in the 2026–27 United Rugby Championship for the Stormers, scoring a try as a replacement against Connacht.

Paulo's second game for the Stormers, away to Edinburgh, was a difficult one. Paulo came on early after an injury to Andre-Hugo Venter, but struggled to find his jumpers, with the Stormers losing ten of their own lineouts in a narrow 13-17 defeat.
