= Ikey Tigers =

South African rugby union club, based in University of Cape Town

(South Africa) UCT Ikey Tigers
- Full name: University of Cape Town Rugby Football Club
- Location: Cape Town, South Africa
- Region: Western Cape
- Ground: UCT Rugby Fields- The Green Mile (Capacity: 4000+)
- Coach(es): Robert Fleck, Brendan Venter, Chean Roux, Joe Allardice
- Captain: Siphumezo Dyonase
- League: FNB Varsity Cup
- 2025: 3rd
Team kit

Official website
- www.uctrfc.co.za

The Ikey Tigers are a South African rugby union team from the University of Cape Town in the Western Cape who compete in the FNB Varsity Cup.

== History ==
The "Ikey" nickname originated in the 1910s as an antisemitic epithet applied to UCT students by the students of Stellenbosch University, because of the supposed large number of Jewish students at UCT.

Since the inception of the FNB Varsity Cup, the Ikey Tigers have been one of the strongest competitors, winning the title three times, in 2011, 2014 and 2025, and finishing runners up five times.

== Stadium ==
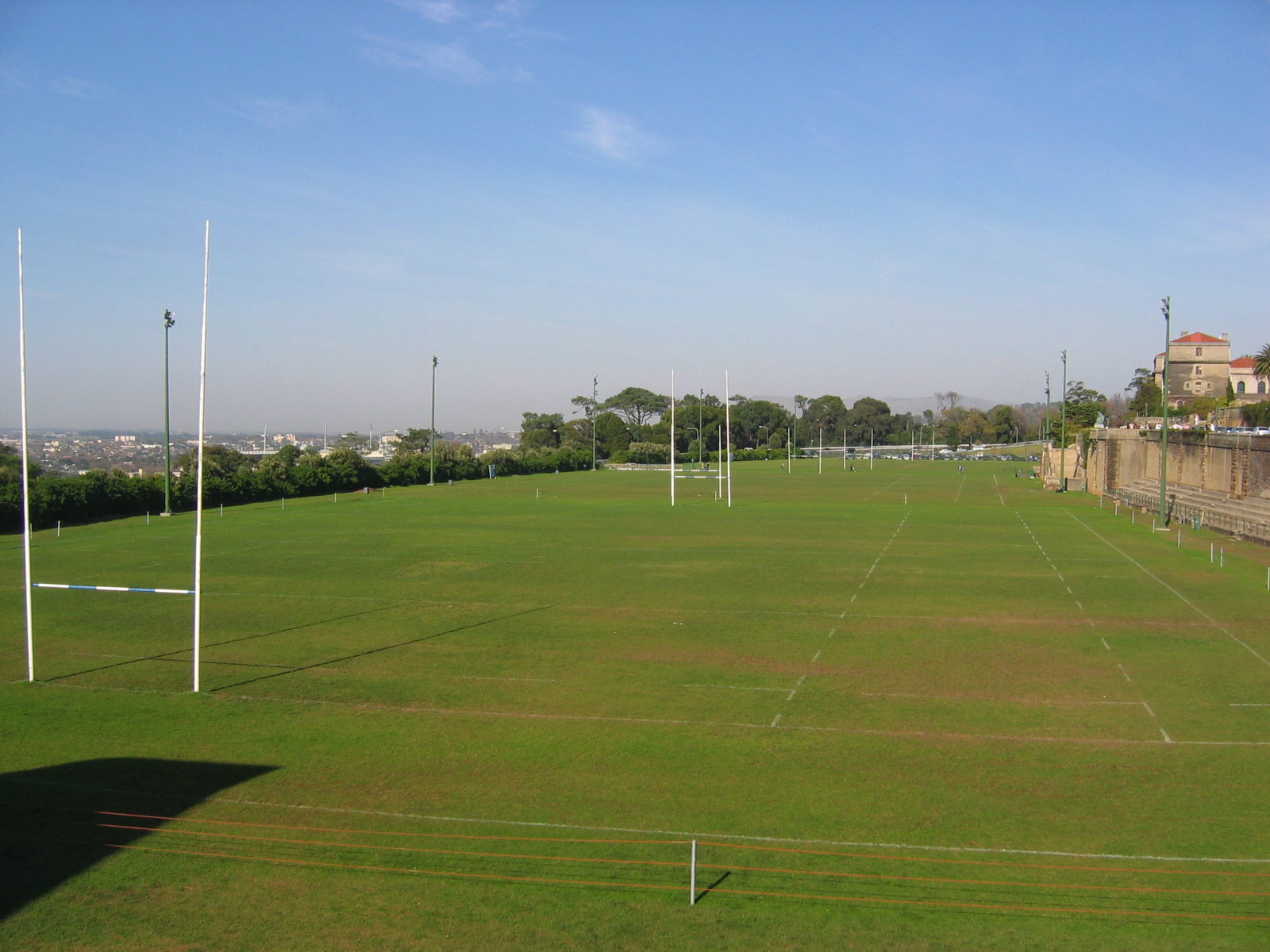
The rugby fields at UCT

The Ikey Tigers play their home fixtures on the Groote Schuur Rugby Field which is adjacent to the university campus. The fields are known commonly by UCT students as The Green Mile. Since the inception of the Varsity Cup, the field has not met the required standards for night fixtures which has resulted in UCT playing two "home" finals away, namely in 2008 when they had to travel to Stellenbosch to play Maties and in 2011 when they had to travel to Pretoria to play Tuks. On 7 March 2011 the UCT rugby club received a $1 million donation from Neville Isdell which allowed them to dust off their longtime plans to build a proper rugby stadium.

== Rivalries ==
The Ikey Tigers main rivalry is with Stellenbosch University's Maties. The rivalry is fuelled by the relative geographical proximity of the two universities, and their status as the two top universities in the Western Cape.

Results:

Date	Home team	Score	Away team	Reference
20 March 2008	UCT	38–34	Maties
7 April 2008	Maties	16–10	UCT
2 February 2009	UCT	10–12	Maties
8 March 2010	Maties	23–17	UCT
29 March 2010	Maties	17–14	UCT
7 March 2011	UCT	16–37	Maties
12 March 2012	Maties	45–5	UCT
4 March 2013	UCT	15–37	Maties
10 February 2014	Maties	16–33	UCT
24 March 2014	UCT	20–8	Maties

== Season standings ==
Ikey Tigers Varsity Cup Final Standings
Season	Position	P	W	D	L	PF	PA	PD	BP	Pts	Play-off Result
2008	2nd	7	6	0	1	260	149	+111	7	31	Losing finalists
2009	1st	7	5	0	2	177	121	+56	5	25	Losing semi-finalists
2010	2nd	7	5	1	1	223	139	+84	3	25	Losing finalists
2011	2nd	7	5	0	2	213	134	+79	3	23	Champions
2012	7th	7	1	1	5	164	195	–31	3	9	Won relegation play-off
2013	7th	7	1	2	4	159	198	–39	3	11	
2014	2nd	7	5	0	2	186	141	+45	4	24	Champions
2015	3rd	7	4	1	2	258	157	+101	4	22	Losing semi-finalists
2016	8th	7	0	0	7	103	324	–221	3	3	Won relegation play-off
2017	8th	8	2	0	6	140	248	−108	1	9	
2018	6th	8	4	0	4	182	181	+1	5	21	
2019	5th	8	3	1	4	227	262	−35	6	20	
2021	2nd	9	8	1	0	174			7	41	Losing finalists
2022	3rd	8									Losing semi-finalists
2023	2nd	9									Losing finalists
2024	2nd	9									Losing finalists
2025	3rd	9									Champions

== Individual records ==
- Tries (Season): Mathew Turner (9 tries in 2008); Therlow Pietersen (7 tries in 2011); Therlow Pietersen (6 tries in 2009)
- Tries (Career): Therlow Pietersen (15 in 2009–11); Marcello Sampson (14 in 2008–10); Nyasha Tarusenga (14 in 2015–19); Ntokozo Makhaza (14 in 2022–2024)
- Most Points (Season): Demetri Catrakilis (136 in 2011)
- Most Points (Career): Ntokozo Makhaza (267 in 2024–2025)

== Player awards ==
- 2008 Top Try Scorer – Mathew Turner (9 tries)
- 2009 Top Try Scorer – Therlow Pietersen (6 tries)
- 2009 Back That Rocks – Therlow Pietersen
- 2011 Top Try Scorer – Therlow Pietersen (7 tries)
- 2011 Top Points Scorer – Demetri Catrakilis (136 points)
- 2014 Forward That Rocks – Shaun McDonald
- 2024 Overall Player That Rocks – Ntokozo Makhaza

== Notable players and coaches ==
- Jake White - Assistant Coach 2008
- Bobby Skinstad - Assistant Coach 2008
- Robbie Fleck - Assistant Coach 2009
- Mathew Turner - Wing 2008
- Tim Whitehead - Center 2008
- Kyle Brown - Wing 2008
- JJ Gagiano - 8th Man 2008–2010
- Siya Kolisi - Flank 2010
- Marcel Brache - Wing 2010–2011
- Nic Groom - Scrumhalf 2010–2011
- Demetri Catrakilis - Fly Half 2011
- Nizaam Carr - Flank 2011
- Eben Etzebeth - Lock 2011
- Don Armand - Lock, flank 2008–2011
- Damian de Allende - Centre 2012
- Oli Kebble - Prop 2013
- Huw Jones - Centre 2014

== See also ==
- FNB Varsity Cup
- 2011 Varsity Cup
- University of Cape Town
