= Tuks Stadium =

Soccer stadium in Pretoria

- Interactive map of Tuks Stadium
- Former names: LC de Villiers Stadium
- Location: Hatfield, Pretoria, South Africa
- Coordinates: 25.75049790840938°S 28.248676231460383°E
- Owner: University of Pretoria
- Capacity: 14,150

Tuks Stadium is a soccer stadium in Hatfield, Pretoria, and the home ground of the University of Pretoria F.C. It is mainly used for rugby games.
