= Central University of Technology, Free State =

Public university in Bloemfontein, South Africa

Coordinates: 29°07′17″S 26°12′49″E

- Motto: Thinking Beyond
- Type: Public University of Technology
- Established: 1981
- Chancellor: Vincent Maphai
- Vice-Chancellor: Pamela Dube
- Administrative staff: 1 100
- Students: 21 993
- Location: Bloemfontein, Welkom, Free State, South Africa
- Colours: Red, yellow and blue
- Website: www.cut.ac.za

The Central University of Technology, Free State (CUT) is a public technology university with campuses in Bloemfontein and Welkom, Free State province, South Africa.

It was established in 1981 as "Technikon Free State." As part of the South African government's restructuring of tertiary education for the new millennium it was promoted to university of technology status.

It is currently part of the BRICS Universities League, a consortium of leading research universities from Brazil, Russia, India, China, and South Africa.

== Campus ==
The university has two campuses – one in Bloemfontein, the judicial capital of South Africa, and one in Welkom, in the heart of the Free State goldfields. The two campuses offer education opportunities in a number of technological fields, including science, technology, engineering and mathematics (STEM); management sciences; humanities; and education.

== Academics ==
The Central University of Technology employs over 800 academic and research staff spread across four faculties.

=== Faculties ===
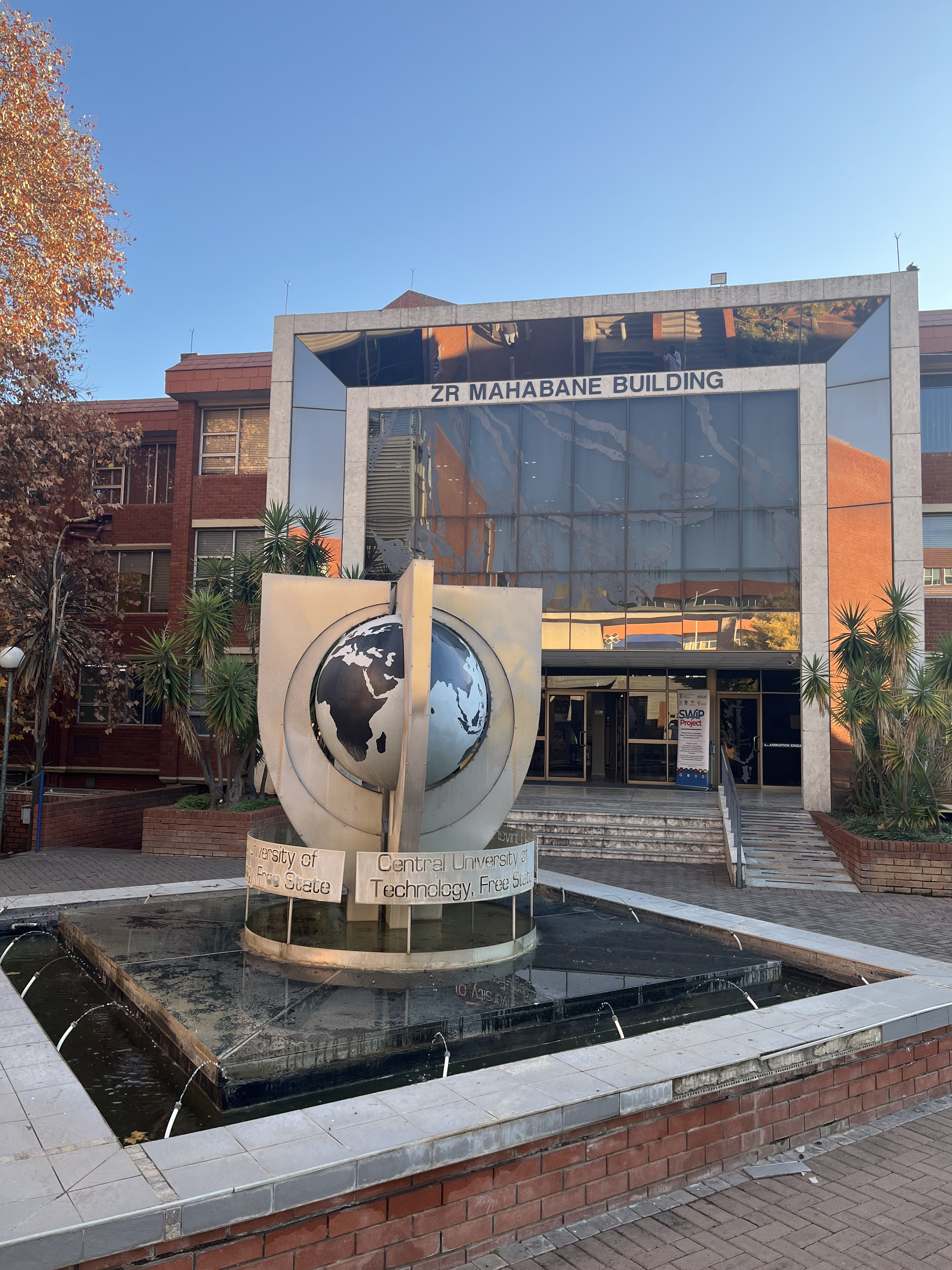
Fountain by the entrance of Z.R Mahabane at the University of Technology, Bloemfontein

- Faculty of Engineering, Built Environment and Information Technology
- Faculty of Health and Environmental Sciences
- Faculty of Humanities
- Faculty of Management Sciences

=== Student enrollment ===
The qualifications on offer reside in four faculties, namely Faculty of Health and Environmental Sciences; Faculty of Humanities; Faculty of Engineering, Built Environment and Information Technology (IT); and Faculty of Management Sciences. The university offers certificates and diplomas at undergraduate level, as well as advanced diplomas, postgraduate diplomas at honours level, and master's and doctoral degrees.

=== RGEMS ===
Research Group in Evolvable Manufacturing Systems
- Established: 2006
- Students: 15

RGEMS (Research Group in Evolvable Manufacturing Systems) is a research group within the Department of Electrical, Electronic and Computer Engineering at the Central University of Technology, Free State.

Established in 2006 by Prof. Herman Vermaak and Dr. Nicolaas Luwes.

The group has also participated in national competitions, such as the Siemens National Cyber Junkyard.
