= UJ Stadium =

South African rugby stadium

- Interactive map of UJ Stadium
- Full name: University of Johannesburg
- Coordinates: 26.178382°S 27.992467°E
- Owner: University of Johannesburg
- Capacity: 8,000

The UJ Stadium is a multi-sports stadium facility in Westdene, Johannesburg. It is mainly used for rugby games.

The stadium was used as an official training venue during the 2010 FIFA World Cup.
