= Absa Puk Oval =

Cricket ground

Coordinates: 26.6919°S 27.1002°E

- Fanie du Toit Sports Complex; University Oval

Ground information
- Location: Potchefstroom, South Africa
- Country: South Africa
- Establishment: 1982
- Capacity: n/a
- Owner: North-West University
- Operator: North-West University
- Tenants: Transvaal; South African Universities

International information
- First WODI: 6 October 2010: Ireland v Pakistan
- Last WODI: 19 May 2017: South Africa v Ireland
- First WT20I: 14 October 2010: South Africa v West Indies
- Last WT20I: 16 October 2010: Sri Lanka v West Indies
- As of 7 September 2020; Source: North-West University No1 Ground Cricinfo

The Absa Puk Oval, formerly known as the Fanie du Toit Sports Complex and the University Oval is a cricket ground in Potchefstroom, South Africa. It has hosted senior cricket irregularly since 1982, when Transvaal hosted South African Universities.

In 2010, it was one of three venues used for the ICC Women's Cricket Challenge. It was also used for the 2017 South Africa Quadrangular Series, contested between the women's teams of India, Ireland, South Africa and Zimbabwe.
