= 2019 Varsity Rugby =

2019 Varsity Rugby was the 2019 edition of four rugby union competitions annually played between several university teams in South Africa. It was contested from 4 February to 22 April 2019 and was the twelfth edition of these competitions.

== Varsity Cup ==
The following teams competed in the 2019 Varsity Cup: CUT Ixias, Maties, NWU Pukke, UCT Ikey Tigers, UFS Shimlas, UJ, UP Tuks, UWC and Wits. It was the first appearance in the competition for UWC, who won promotion from the 2018 Varsity Shield.

== Varsity Shield ==
The following teams competed in the 2019 Varsity Shield: CPUT, NMU Madibaz, Rhodes, TUT Vikings, UFH Blues, UKZN Impi and WSU All Blacks. It was the first appearance in the competition for NMU Madibaz, who were relegated from the 2018 Varsity Cup.

== Young Guns ==
=== Competition rules ===
There were nine participating universities in the 2019 Young Guns competition, the Under-20 sides of each of the nine Varsity Cup teams. These teams were divided into three regionalised sections and each team played every team in their section twice over the course of the season, once at home and once away.

Teams received four points for a win and two points for a draw. Bonus points were awarded to teams that scored four or more tries in a game, as well as to teams that lost a match by eight points or less. Teams were ranked by log points, then points difference (points scored less points conceded).

The three section winners qualified for the semi-finals, along with the runner-up with the best record.

=== Teams ===
2019 Young Guns North teams
| Team | University | Stadium |
|---|---|---|
| UJ Young Guns | University of Johannesburg | UJ Stadium, Johannesburg |
| UP Tuks Young Guns | University of Pretoria | LC de Villiers Stadium, Pretoria |
| Wits Young Guns | University of the Witwatersrand | Wits Rugby Stadium, Johannesburg |

2019 Young Guns Central teams
| Team | University | Stadium |
|---|---|---|
| CUT Young Guns | Central Institute of Technology | CUT Stadium, Bloemfontein |
| NWU Pukke Young Guns | North-West University | Fanie du Toit Sport Ground, Potchefstroom |
| UFS Shimlas Young Guns | University of the Free State | Shimla Park, Bloemfontein |

2019 Young Guns South teams
| Team | University | Stadium |
|---|---|---|
| Maties Juniors | Stellenbosch University | Danie Craven Stadium, Stellenbosch |
| UWC Young Guns | University of the Western Cape | UWC Sport Stadium, Cape Town |
| UCT Trojans | University of Cape Town | UCT Rugby Fields, Cape Town |

== Res Rugby ==
=== Competition rules ===
There were nine participating teams in the 2019 Res Rugby competition — the winners of the internal leagues of each of the nine Varsity Cup teams. These teams were divided into two divisions (a Championship division with five teams and a Premiership division with four teams) and each team played every team in their division once over the course of the season, either at home or away.

Teams received four points for a win and two points for a draw. Bonus points were awarded to teams that scored four or more tries in a game, as well as to teams that lost a match by eight points or less. Teams were ranked by log points, then points difference (points scored less points conceded).

The top two teams in the Championship qualified for the final.

== See also ==
- Varsity Cup
- 2019 Varsity Cup
- 2019 Varsity Shield
- 2019 Gold Cup
