= 2018 Varsity Rugby =

2018 Varsity Rugby was the 2018 edition of four rugby union competitions annually played between several university teams in South Africa. It was contested from 29 January to 16 April 2018 and was the eleventh edition of these competitions.

== Varsity Cup ==
The following teams competed in the 2018 Varsity Cup: CUT Ixias, Maties, NMMU Madibaz, NWU Pukke, UCT Ikey Tigers, UFS Shimlas, UJ, UP Tuks and Wits. All these teams also played in the competition in 2017. The competition was won by Maties, who beat NWU Pukke 40–7 in the final. NMU Madibaz finished bottom of the log and were relegated to the 2019 Varsity Shield. CUT Ixias remained in the Varsity Cup for 2019 after beating the WSU All Blacks in a relegation play-off.

== Varsity Shield ==
The following teams competed in the 2018 Varsity Shield: CPUT, Rhodes, TUT Vikings, UFH Blues, UKZN Impi, UWC and WSU All Blacks. All these teams also played in the competition in 2017. The competition was won by UWC, who beat WSU All Blacks 55–10 in the final. UWC were promoted to the 2019 Varsity Cup for the first time, while the WSU All Blacks remained in the Varsity Shield for 2019 after losing to CUT Ixias in a promotion play-off.

== Promotion/relegation play-offs ==
=== 2019 Varsity Cup play-off ===
There was a promotion/relegation match between CUT Ixias, who finished eighth in the 2018 Varsity Cup and the WSU All Blacks, who finished runners-up in the 2018 Varsity Shield. CUT Ixias won 37–31 to retain their place in the Varsity Cup for 2019, while the WSU All Blacks remained in the Varsity Shield competition.

16 April 2018	CUT Ixias	37–31	WSU All Blacks	Danie Craven Stadium, Stellenbosch
		Report		Referee: Stephan Geldenhuys

=== 2019 Varsity Shield play-off ===
There was a promotion/relegation match between Rhodes, who finished seventh in the 2018 Varsity Shield and the University of Zululand, as the best-performing non-Varsity Rugby team at the USSA tournament. Rhodes won 44–5 to retain their place in the Varsity Shield for 2019.

20 August 2018	Rhodes	44–5	University of Zululand	Rhodes Great Field, Grahamstown
		Report

== Young Guns ==
=== Competition rules ===
There were nine participating universities in the 2018 Young Guns competition, the Under-20 sides of each of the nine Varsity Cup teams. These teams were divided into three regionalised sections and each team played every team in their section twice over the course of the season, once at home and once away.

Teams received four points for a win and two points for a draw. Bonus points were awarded to teams that scored four or more tries in a game, as well as to teams that lost a match by eight points or less. Teams were ranked by log points, then points difference (points scored less points conceded).

The three section winners qualified for the semi-finals, along with the runner-up with the best record.

=== Teams ===
2018 Young Guns North teams
Team	University	Stadium
UJ Young Guns	University of Johannesburg	UJ Stadium, Johannesburg
UP Tuks Young Guns	University of Pretoria	LC de Villiers Stadium, Pretoria
Wits Young Guns	University of the Witwatersrand	Wits Rugby Stadium, Johannesburg

2018 Young Guns Central teams
Team	University	Stadium
CUT Young Guns	Central Institute of Technology	CUT Stadium, Bloemfontein
NWU Pukke Young Guns	North-West University	Fanie du Toit Sport Ground, Potchefstroom
UFS Shimlas Young Guns	University of the Free State	Shimla Park, Bloemfontein

2018 Young Guns South teams
Team	University	Stadium
Maties Juniors	Stellenbosch University	Danie Craven Stadium, Stellenbosch
NMMU Young Guns	Nelson Mandela Metropolitan University	NMU Stadium, Port Elizabeth
UCT Trojans	University of Cape Town	UCT Rugby Fields, Cape Town

=== Young Guns North ===
==== Log ====
The final standings for the 2018 Varsity Cup Young Guns North were:

2018 Varsity Cup Young Guns North log
Pos	Team	Pl	W	D	L	PF	PA	PD	BP	Pts
1	UP Tuks Young Guns	4	4	0	0	318	49	+269	4	17
2	UJ Young Guns	4	2	0	2	70	193	−123	1	9
3	Wits Young Guns	4	0	0	4	57	203	−146	3	5

- UP Tuks Young Guns qualified for the semifinals as section winners.

==== Matches ====
The following matches were played in the 2018 Varsity Cup Young Guns North:

5 February 2018	Wits Young Guns	8–84	UP Tuks Young Guns	Wits Rugby Stadium, Johannesburg
15:00		Scoreboard

26 February 2018	UJ Young Guns	13–65	UP Tuks Young Guns	UJ Stadium, Johannesburg
16:45		Scoreboard

5 March 2018	UJ Young Guns	13–5	Wits Young Guns	UJ Stadium, Johannesburg
14:30		Scoreboard

12 March 2018	Wits Young Guns	28–32	UJ Young Guns	Wits Rugby Stadium, Johannesburg
14:15		Scoreboard

19 March 2018	UP Tuks Young Guns	95–12	UJ Young Guns	LC de Villiers Stadium, Pretoria
15:00		Scoreboard

26 March 2018	UP Tuks Young Guns	74–16	Wits Young Guns	LC de Villiers Stadium, Pretoria
16:30		Scoreboard

=== Young Guns Central ===
==== Log ====
The final standings for the 2018 Varsity Cup Young Guns Central were:

2018 Varsity Cup Young Guns Central log
Pos	Team	Pl	W	D	L	PF	PA	PD	BP	Pts
1	UFS Shimlas Young Guns	4	4	0	0	262	126	+136	4	20
2	NWU Pukke Young Guns	4	2	0	2	227	162	+65	4	12
3	CUT Young Guns	4	0	0	4	109	310	−201	2	2

- UFS Shimlas Young Guns qualified for the semifinals as section winners and NWU Pukke Young Guns qualified for the semifinals as the runner-up with the best record across the three sections.

==== Matches ====
The following matches were played in the 2018 Varsity Cup Young Guns Central:

12 February 2018	UFS Shimlas Young Guns	47–37	NWU Pukke Young Guns	Shimla Park, Bloemfontein
16:00		Scoreboard

26 February 2018	UFS Shimlas Young Guns	102–21	CUT Young Guns	Shimla Park, Bloemfontein
15:00		Scoreboard

5 March 2018	CUT Young Guns	39–61	NWU Pukke Young Guns	CUT Stadium, Bloemfontein
16:15		Scoreboard

12 March 2018	NWU Pukke Young Guns	40–55	UFS Shimlas Young Guns	Fanie du Toit Sport Ground, Potchefstroom
15:00		Scoreboard

19 March 2018	CUT Young Guns	28–58	UFS Shimlas Young Guns	CUT Stadium, Bloemfontein
14:15		Scoreboard

26 March 2018	NWU Pukke Young Guns	89–21	CUT Young Guns	Fanie du Toit Sport Ground, Potchefstroom
15:00		Scoreboard

=== Young Guns South ===
==== Log ====
The final standings for the 2018 Varsity Cup Young Guns South were:

2018 Varsity Cup Young Guns South log
Pos	Team	Pl	W	D	L	PF	PA	PD	BP	Pts
1	Maties Juniors	4	4	0	0	207	66	+141	4	20
2	UCT Trojans	4	2	0	2	73	113	−40	1	9
3	NMMU Young Guns	4	0	0	4	73	174	−101	2	2

- Maties Juniors qualified for the semifinals as section winners.

==== Matches ====
The following matches were played in the 2018 Varsity Cup Young Guns South:

5 February 2018	NMMU Young Guns	13–15	UCT Trojans	NMU Stadium, Port Elizabeth
14:15		Scoreboard

12 February 2018	Maties Juniors	65–22	NMMU Young Guns	Danie Craven Stadium, Stellenbosch
15:00		Scoreboard

19 February 2018	UCT Trojans	8–32	Maties Juniors	UCT Rugby Fields, Cape Town
16:00		Scoreboard

26 February 2018	UCT Trojans	29–23	NMMU Young Guns	UCT Rugby Fields, Cape Town
16:00		Scoreboard

5 March 2018	Maties Juniors	45–21	UCT Trojans	Danie Craven Stadium, Stellenbosch
15:00		Scoreboard

12 March 2018	NMMU Young Guns	15–65	Maties Juniors	NMU Stadium, Port Elizabeth
16:00		Scoreboard

=== Semi-finals ===
2 April 2018	UFS Shimlas Young Guns	0–74	UP Tuks Young Guns	Shimla Park, Bloemfontein
15:00		Scoreboard

2 April 2018	Maties Juniors	74–42	NWU Pukke Young Guns	Danie Craven Stadium, Stellenbosch
15:00		Scoreboard

=== Final ===
9 April 2018	Maties Juniors	45–37	UP Tuks Young Guns	UWC Sport Stadium, Cape Town
16:45		Scoreboard

== Res Rugby ==
=== Competition rules ===
There were nine participating teams in the 2018 Res Rugby competition — the new name for the competition formerly known as the Koshuis Rugby Championship — the winners of the internal leagues of each of the nine Varsity Cup teams. These teams were divided into two divisions (a Championship division with five teams and a Premiership division with four teams) and each team played every team in their division once over the course of the season, either at home or away.

Teams received four points for a win and two points for a draw. Bonus points were awarded to teams that scored four or more tries in a game, as well as to teams that lost a match by eight points or less. Teams were ranked by log points, then points difference (points scored less points conceded).

The top two teams in the Championship qualified for the final.

=== Teams ===
2018 Res Rugby Championship teams
Team	University	Stadium
Huis Marais (Maties)	Stellenbosch University	Danie Craven Stadium, Stellenbosch
Lions (CUT)	Central Institute of Technology	CUT Stadium, Bloemfontein
Maroela (Tuks)	University of Pretoria	LC de Villiers Stadium, Pretoria
Patria (Pukke)	North-West University	Fanie du Toit Sport Ground, Potchefstroom
Vishuis (Shimlas)	University of the Free State	Shimla Park, Bloemfontein

2018 Res Rugby Premiership teams
Team	University	Stadium
Cobras (UCT)	University of Cape Town	UCT Rugby Fields, Cape Town
Harlequins (Madibaz)	Nelson Mandela Metropolitan University	NMU Stadium, Port Elizabeth
Junction (Wits)	University of the Witwatersrand	Wits Rugby Stadium, Johannesburg
Oppierif (UJ)	University of Johannesburg	UJ Stadium, Johannesburg

=== Championship ===
==== Log ====
The final standings for the 2018 Res Rugby Championship were:

2018 Res Rugby Championship log
Pos	Team	Pl	W	D	L	PF	PA	PD	BP	Pts
1	Patria (Pukke)	4	4	0	0	131	73	+58	3	19
2	Vishuis (Shimlas)	4	3	0	1	143	45	+98	3	15
3	Maroela (Tuks)	4	2	0	2	84	104	−20	3	11
4	Huis Marais (Maties)	4	1	0	3	86	110	−24	3	7
5	Lions (CUT)	4	0	0	4	59	171	−112	1	1

- Patria (Pukke) and Vishuis (Shimlas) qualified for the final.

==== Matches ====
The following matches were played in the 2018 Res Rugby Championship:

12 February 2018	Lions (CUT)	0–42	Vishuis (Shimlas)	CUT Stadium, Bloemfontein

12 February 2018	Huis Marais (Maties)	7–13	Maroela (Tuks)	Danie Craven Stadium, Stellenbosch

19 February 2018	Patria (Pukke)	50–15	Lions (CUT)	Fanie du Toit Sport Ground, Potchefstroom

26 February 2018	Vishuis (Shimlas)	48–21	Huis Marais (Maties)	Shimla Park, Bloemfontein

5 March 2018	Maroela (Tuks)	29–34	Patria (Pukke)	LC de Villiers Stadium, Pretoria

5 March 2018	Huis Marais (Maties)	37–26	Lions (CUT)	Danie Craven Stadium, Stellenbosch

12 March 2018	Patria (Pukke)	24–8	Vishuis (Shimlas)	Fanie du Toit Sport Ground, Potchefstroom

19 March 2018	Maroela (Tuks)	42–18	Lions (CUT)	LC de Villiers Stadium, Pretoria

26 March 2018	Vishuis (Shimlas)	45–0	Maroela (Tuks)	Shimla Park, Bloemfontein

26 March 2018	Patria (Pukke)	23–21	Huis Marais (Maties)	Fanie du Toit Sport Ground, Potchefstroom

==== Final ====
16 April 2018	Patria (Pukke)	29–55	Vishuis (Shimlas)	Danie Craven Stadium, Stellenbosch

=== Premiership ===
==== Log ====
The final standings for the 2018 Res Rugby Premiership were:

2018 Res Rugby Premiership log
Pos	Team	Pl	W	D	L	PF	PA	PD	BP	Pts
1	Oppierif (UJ)	3	3	0	0	141	24	+117	3	15
2	Cobras (UCT)	3	2	0	1	74	59	+15	2	10
3	Harlequins (Madibaz)	3	1	0	2	36	71	−35	0	4
4	Junction (Wits)	3	0	0	3	20	117	−97	0	0

==== Matches ====
The following matches were played in the 2018 Res Rugby Championship:

12 February 2018	Cobras (UCT)	29–0	Harlequins (Madibaz)	UCT Rugby Fields, Cape Town

19 February 2018	Harlequins (Madibaz)	28–8	Junction (Wits)	NMU Stadium, Port Elizabeth

26 February 2018	Junction (Wits)	12–29	Cobras (UCT)	Wits Rugby Stadium, Johannesburg

5 March 2018	Oppierif (UJ)	34–8	Harlequins (Madibaz)	UJ Stadium, Johannesburg

12 March 2018	Junction (Wits)	0–60	Oppierif (UJ)	Wits Rugby Stadium, Johannesburg

26 March 2018	Oppierif (UJ)	47–16	Cobras (UCT)	UJ Stadium, Johannesburg

== See also ==
- Varsity Cup
- 2017 Varsity Cup
- 2017 Varsity Shield
- 2017 Gold Cup
