= 2017 Varsity Shield =

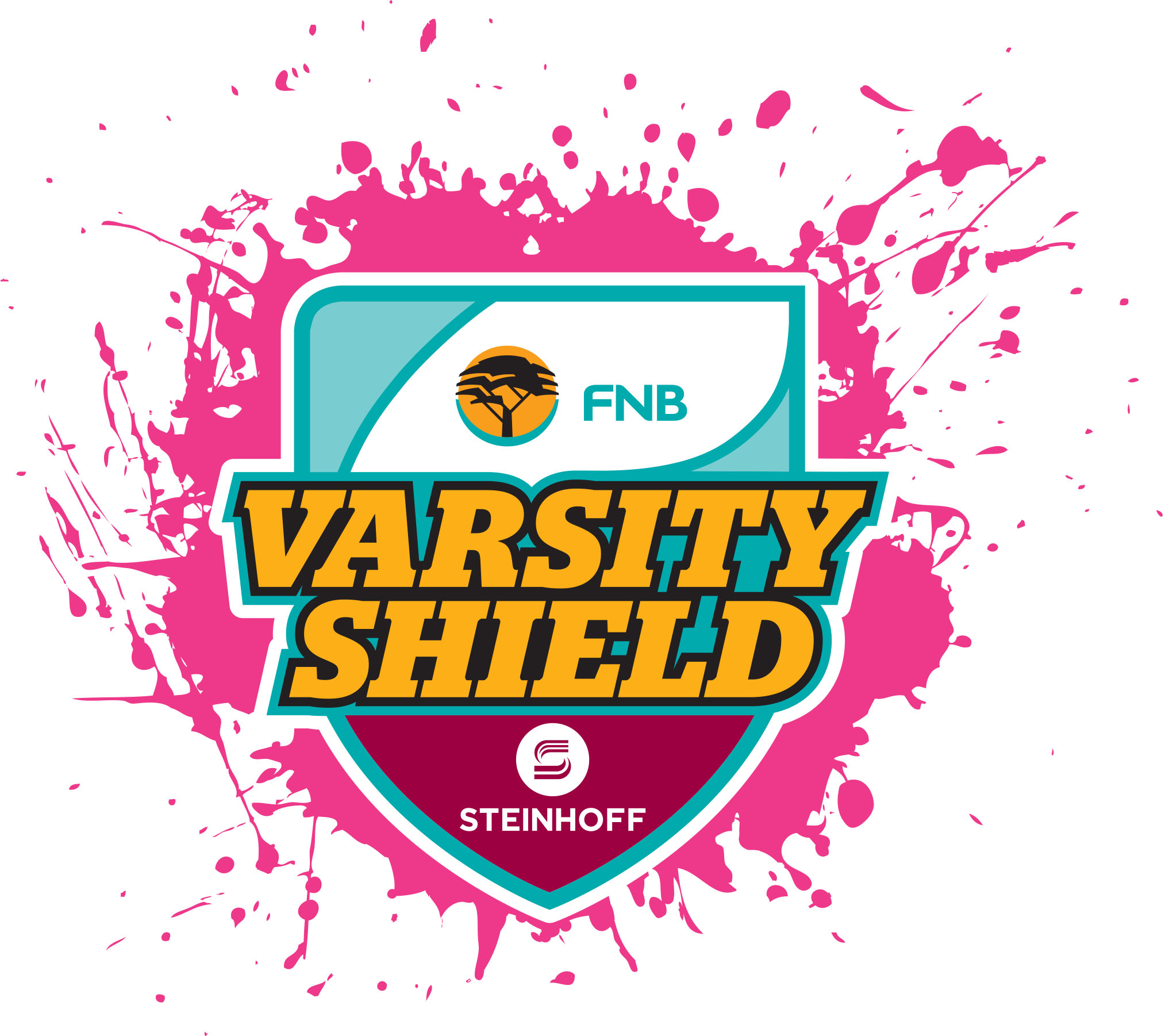
- Countries: South Africa
- Date: 9 February – 10 April 2017

The 2017 Varsity Shield was the 2017 edition of the Varsity Shield, an annual second-tier inter-university rugby union competition featuring university sides in South Africa. The tournament – known as the FNB Varsity Shield presented by Steinhoff International for sponsorship reasons – was the seventh season of the Varsity Shield and was contested from 9 February to 10 April 2017.

== Competition rules and information ==
There were seven participating universities in the 2017 Varsity Shield. These teams played each other once over the course of the season, either home or away.

Teams received four points for a win and two points for a draw. Bonus points were awarded to teams that scored four or more tries in a game, as well as to teams that lost a match by seven points or less. Teams were ranked by log points, then points difference (points scored less points conceded).

The top four teams qualified for the title play-offs. In the semi-finals, the team that finished first had home advantage against the team that received fourth, while the team that finished second had home advantage against the team that finished third. The winners of these semi-finals played each other in the final, at the home venue of the higher-placed team.

== Teams ==
Location of teams in the 2017 Varsity Shield

The following teams took part in the 2017 Varsity Shield competition:

2017 Varsity Shield teams
Team name	University	Stadium
CPUT	Cape Peninsula University of Technology	CPUT Sports Stadium, Cape Town
Rhodes	Rhodes University	Rhodes Great Field, Grahamstown
TUT Vikings	Tshwane University of Technology	TUT Stadium, Pretoria
UFH Blues	University of Fort Hare	Davidson Rugby Field, Alice
UKZN Impi	University of KwaZulu-Natal	Howard College Rugby Stadium, Durban
UKZN Impi	University of KwaZulu-Natal	Peter Booysen Sports Park, Pietermaritzburg
UWC	University of the Western Cape	UWC Sport Stadium, Cape Town
WSU All Blacks	Walter Sisulu University	Buffalo City Stadium, East London

== Standings ==
The final standings for the 2017 Varsity Shield were:

2017 Varsity Shield standings
Pos	Team	P	W	D	L	PF	PA	PD	TF	TA	TB	LB	Pts
1	UWC	6	5	0	1	274	102	+172			6	1	27
2	UFH Blues	6	4	0	2	144	102	+42			3	1	20
3	UKZN Impi	6	4	0	2	132	97	+35			3	1	20
4	WSU All Blacks (Note: WSU All Blacks were found guilty of fielding ineligible players in their first two matches of the season. Both matches were awarded as a 32–0 victory to their opponents.)	6	3	0	3	118	138	−20			2	0	14
5	CPUT (Note: CPUT were found guilty of fielding ineligible players in three of their matches during the season. All those matches were awarded as a 32–0 victory to their opponents.)	6	2	0	4	91	152	−61			1	1	10
6	TUT Vikings	6	2	0	4	94	142	−48			0	1	9
7	Rhodes	6	1	0	5	90	210	−120			1	1	6

Legend and competition rules
Legend:
Top four teams; qualified to the semi-finals.	P = Games played, W = Games won, D = Games drawn, L = Games lost, PF = Points for, PA = Points against, PD = Points difference, TF = Tries for, TA = Tries against, TB = Try bonus points, LB = Losing bonus points, Pts = Log points
Competition rules:
Play-offs: The top four teams qualified to the semi-finals. The first-placed team hosted the fourth-placed team and the second-placed team hosted the third-placed team. The higher-ranked semi-final winner then hosted the lower-ranked semi-final winner in the final. Points breakdown: * 4 points for a win * 2 points for a draw * 1 bonus point for a loss by seven points or less * 1 bonus point for scoring four or more tries in a match

=== Round-by-round ===
The table below shows each team's progression throughout the season. For each round, their cumulative points total is shown with the overall log position in brackets:

Team Progression – 2017 Varsity Shield
Team	R1	R2	R3	R4	R5	R6	R7	Semi	Final
UWC	5 (2nd)	7 (2nd)	12 (1st)	17 (1st)	22 (1st)	22 (1st)	27 (1st)	Won	
UFH Blues	5 (1st)	10 (1st)	11 (2nd)	16 (2nd)	20 (2nd)	20 (2nd)	20 (2nd)	Won	
UKZN Impi	0 (6th)	5 (4th)	9 (3rd)	14 (3rd)	14 (3rd)	15 (3rd)	20 (3rd)	Lost	—N/a
WSU All Blacks	0 (7th)	0 (7th)	4 (6th)	4 (6th)	9 (4th)	14 (4th)	14 (4th)	Lost	—N/a
CPUT	1 (4th)	1 (6th)	1 (7th)	1 (7th)	1 (7th)	5 (6th)	10 (5th)	—N/a	—N/a
TUT Vikings	4 (3rd)	4 (5th)	5 (5th)	5 (5th)	5 (6th)	9 (5th)	9 (6th)	—N/a	—N/a
Rhodes	1 (5th)	6 (3rd)	6 (4th)	6 (4th)	6 (5th)	6 (6th)	6 (7th)	—N/a	—N/a
Key:	win	draw	loss	bye					

== Matches ==
The following matches were played in the 2017 Varsity Shield:

=== Round one ===
9 February 2017	UWC	26–23	CPUT	UWC Sport Stadium, Cape Town
16:45		Report; Scoreboard

9 February 2017	TUT Vikings	16–12	Rhodes	TUT Stadium, Pretoria
18:30		Report; Scoreboard

9 February 2017	UFH Blues	32–0	WSU All Blacks	Davidson Rugby Field, Alice
19:00		Report; Scoreboard

Bye/s: UKZN Impi

=== Round two ===
13 February 2017	UFH Blues	32–31	UWC	Davidson Rugby Field, Alice
18:30		Report; Scoreboard

13 February 2017	Rhodes	32–0	CPUT	Rhodes Great Field, Grahamstown
18:30		Report; Scoreboard

13 February 2017	WSU All Blacks	0–32	UKZN Impi	Buffalo City Stadium, East London
18:30		Report; Scoreboard

Bye/s: TUT Vikings

=== Round three ===
20 February 2017	UWC	88–8	Rhodes	UWC Sport Stadium, Cape Town
18:30		Report; Scoreboard

20 February 2017	TUT Vikings	13–17	WSU All Blacks	TUT Stadium, Pretoria
18:30		Report; Scoreboard

20 February 2017	UKZN Impi	16–10	UFH Blues	Peter Booysen Sports Park, Pietermaritzburg
18:30		Report; Scoreboard

Bye/s: CPUT

=== Round four ===
27 February 2017	UWC	30–10	TUT Vikings	UWC Sport Stadium, Cape Town
18:30

27 February 2017	Rhodes	10–30	UFH Blues	Rhodes Great Field, Grahamstown
18:30

27 February 2017	CPUT	0–32	UKZN Impi	CPUT Sports Stadium, Cape Town
18:30

Bye/s: WSU All Blacks

=== Round five ===
6 March 2017	UFH Blues	28–16	TUT Vikings	Davidson Rugby Field, Alice
18:30

6 March 2017	WSU All Blacks	32–0	CPUT	Buffalo City Stadium, East London
18:30

6 March 2017	UKZN Impi	5–53	UWC	Howard College Rugby Stadium, Durban
18:30

Bye/s: Rhodes

=== Round six ===
13 March 2017	TUT Vikings	21–16	UKZN Impi	TUT Stadium, Pretoria
18:30

13 March 2017	Rhodes	15–45	WSU All Blacks	Rhodes Great Field, Grahamstown
18:30

13 March 2017	CPUT	29–12	UFH Blues	CPUT Sports Stadium, Cape Town
18:30

Bye/s: UWC

=== Round seven ===
20 March 2017	WSU All Blacks	24–46	UWC	Buffalo City Stadium, East London
18:30

20 March 2017	UKZN Impi	31–13	Rhodes	Howard College Rugby Stadium, Durban
18:30

20 March 2017	CPUT	39–18	TUT Vikings	CPUT Sports Stadium, Cape Town
18:30

Bye/s: UFH Blues

=== Semi-finals ===
27 March 2017	UWC	50–26	WSU All Blacks	UWC Sport Stadium, Cape Town
18:30

27 March 2017	UFH Blues	45–8	UKZN Impi	Davidson Rugby Field, Alice
18:30

=== Final ===
10 April 2017	UWC	45–2	UFH Blues	UWC Sport Stadium, Cape Town
16:45

== See also ==
- Varsity Cup
- 2017 Varsity Rugby
- 2017 Varsity Cup
- 2017 Gold Cup
