= 2018 Varsity Shield =

2018 South African rugby competition

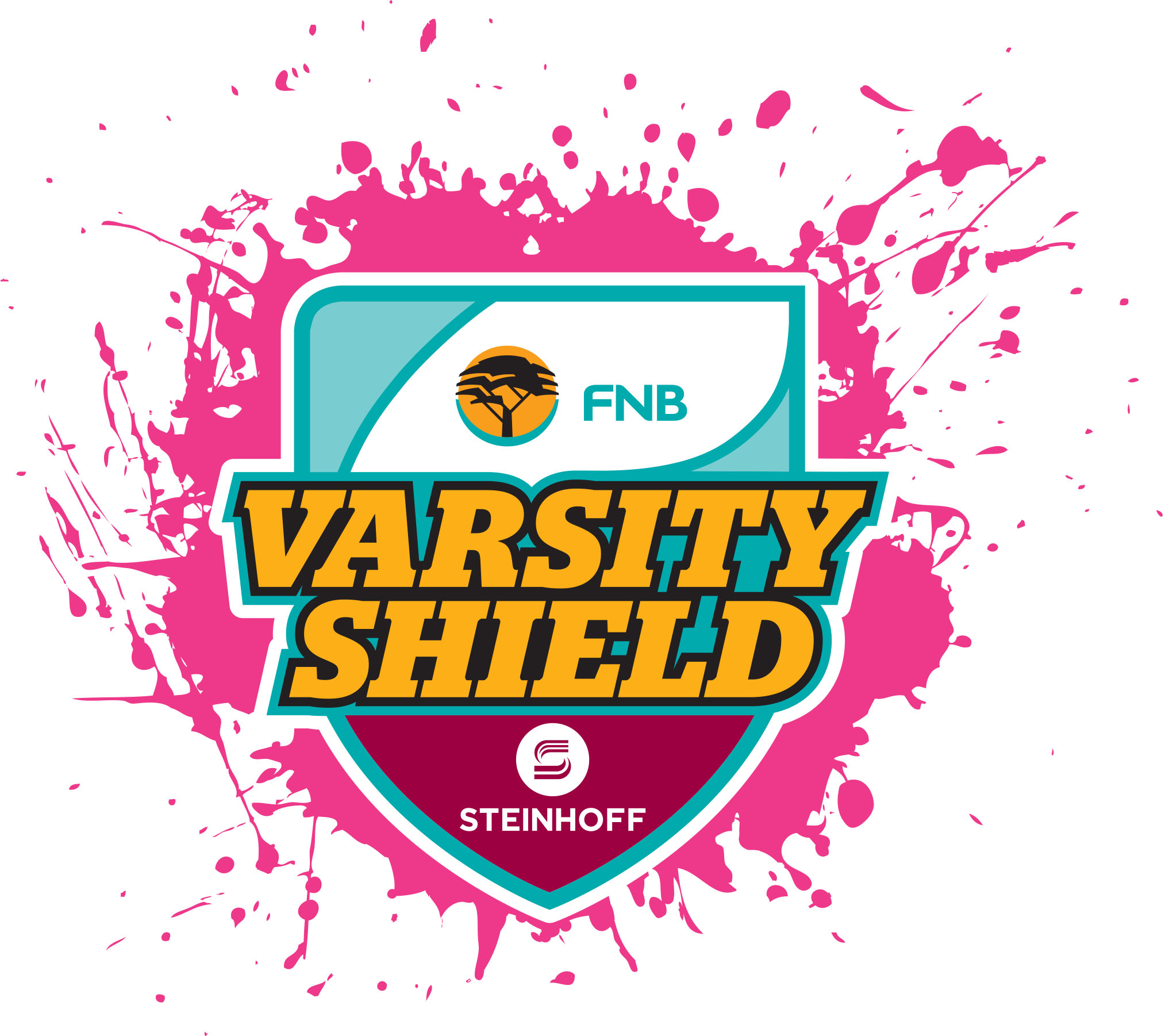
- Countries: South Africa
- Date: 19 February – 9 April 2018
- Champions: UWC (2nd title)
- Runners-up: WSU All Blacks
- Promoted: UWC
- Matches played: 24
- Tries scored: 172 (average 7.2 per match)

The 2018 Varsity Shield was the 8th season of the Varsity Shield, the second-tier competition in the annual Varsity Rugby series. It was played between 19 February and 9 April 2018 and featured seven university teams.

The competition was won by UWC, who beat the WSU All Blacks 55–10 in the final played on 9 April 2018, also winning promotion to the 2019 Varsity Cup.

== Competition rules and information ==
There were seven participating university teams in the 2019 Varsity Shield. They played each other once during the pool stage, either at home or away. Teams received four points for a win and two points for a draw. Bonus points were awarded to teams that scored four or more tries in a game, as well as to teams that lost a match by seven points or less. Teams were ranked by log points, then points difference (points scored less points conceded).

The top four teams after the pool stage qualified for the semifinals, which were followed by a final.

== Teams ==
Location of teams in the 2018 Varsity Shield

The teams that played in the 2018 Varsity Shield were:

2018 Varsity Shield teams
Team name	University	Stadium
CPUT	Cape Peninsula University of Technology	CPUT Sports Stadium, Cape Town
Rhodes	Rhodes University	Rhodes Great Field, Grahamstown
TUT Vikings	Tshwane University of Technology	TUT Stadium, Pretoria
UFH Blues	University of Fort Hare	Davidson Rugby Field, Alice
UKZN Impi	University of KwaZulu-Natal	Peter Booysen Sports Park, Pietermaritzburg
UWC	University of the Western Cape	UWC Sport Stadium, Cape Town
WSU All Blacks	Walter Sisulu University	Buffalo City Stadium, East London

== Pool stage ==
=== Standings ===
The final log for the 2018 Varsity Shield was:

2018 Varsity Shield log
Pos	Team	P	W	D	L	PF	PA	PD	TF	TA	TB	LB	Pts
1	UWC	6	6	0	0	331	86	+245	46	13	6	0	30
2	WSU All Blacks	6	5	0	1	137	111	+26	20	15	2	0	22
3	UKZN Impi	6	3	0	3	148	140	+8	20	18	3	2	17
4	TUT Vikings	6	4	0	2	118	155	−37	16	22	0	1	17
5	UFH Blues	6	2	0	4	116	126	−10	16	17	1	3	12
6	CPUT	6	1	0	5	149	179	−30	19	24	2	3	9
7	Rhodes	6	0	0	6	55	257	−202	9	35	0	0	0
Final standings.

Legend and competition rules
Legend:
Qualified for the semifinals.	P = Games played, W = Games won, D = Games drawn, L = Games lost, PF = Points for, PA = Points against, PD = Points difference, TF = Tries for, TA = Tries against, TB = Try bonus points, LB = Losing bonus points, Pts = Log points
Competition rules:
Qualification: The top four teams qualified for the semifinals. Points breakdown: * 4 points for a win * 2 points for a draw * 1 bonus point for a loss by seven points or less * 1 bonus point for scoring four or more tries in a match

=== Round-by-round ===
The table below shows a team's progression throughout the season. For each round, each team's cumulative points total is shown with the overall log position in brackets.

Team Progression – 2018 Varsity Shield
Team	R1	R2	R3	R4	R5	R6	R7	SF	F
UWC	5 (1st)	10 (1st)	10 (2nd)	15 (1st)	20 (1st)	25 (1st)	30 (1st)	Won	Won
WSU All Blacks	0 (7th)	5 (3rd)	10 (3rd)	14 (2nd)	18 (2nd)	22 (2nd)	22 (2nd)	Won	Lost
UKZN Impi	4 (3rd)	4 (4th)	6 (5th)	11 (4th)	12 (3rd)	12 (4th)	17 (3rd)	Lost	—N/a
TUT Vikings	4 (2nd)	8 (2nd)	12 (1st)	12 (3rd)	12 (4th)	13 (3rd)	17 (4th)	Lost	—N/a
UFH Blues	1 (4th)	1 (6th)	6 (4th)	7 (5th)	11 (5th)	11 (5th)	12 (5th)	—N/a	—N/a
CPUT	0 (5th)	1 (5th)	1 (6th)	1 (6th)	2 (6th)	7 (6th)	9 (6th)	—N/a	—N/a
Rhodes	0 (6th)	0 (7th)	0 (7th)	0 (7th)	0 (7th)	0 (7th)	0 (7th)	—N/a	—N/a
Key:	win	draw	loss	bye					

=== Matches ===
The following matches were played in the 2018 Varsity Shield:

==== Round one ====
19 February 2018	UWC	42–5	WSU All Blacks	UWC Sport Stadium, Cape Town
18:30		Report; Scoreboard

19 February 2018	UFH Blues	18–22	UKZN Impi	Davidson Rugby Field, Alice
18:30		Report; Scoreboard

19 February 2018	Rhodes	7–26	TUT Vikings	Rhodes Great Field, Grahamstown
18:30		Report; Scoreboard

Bye/s: CPUT

==== Round two ====
22 February 2018	WSU All Blacks	47–16	Rhodes	Buffalo City Stadium, East London
16:45		Report; Scoreboard

22 February 2018	TUT Vikings	21–18	CPUT	TUT Stadium, Pretoria
18:30		Report; Scoreboard

22 February 2018	UWC	57–16	UKZN Impi	UWC Sport Stadium, Cape Town
19:00		Report; Scoreboard

Bye/s: UFH Blues

==== Round three ====
26 February 2018	UFH Blues	28–7	Rhodes	Davidson Rugby Field, Alice
18:30		Report; Scoreboard

26 February 2018	UKZN Impi	20–24	TUT Vikings	Howard College Rugby Stadium, Durban
18:30		Report; Scoreboard

26 February 2018	CPUT	21–38	WSU All Blacks	CPUT Sports Stadium, Cape Town
18:30		Report; Scoreboard

Bye/s: UWC

==== Round four ====
5 March 2018	CPUT	14–58	UWC	CPUT Sports Stadium, Cape Town
18:30		Report; Scoreboard

5 March 2018	WSU All Blacks	20–16	UFH Blues	Buffalo City Stadium, East London
18:30		Report; Scoreboard

5 March 2018	Rhodes	0–48	UKZN Impi	Rhodes Great Field, Grahamstown
18:30		Report; Scoreboard

Bye/s: TUT Vikings

==== Round five ====
12 March 2018	TUT Vikings	18–77	UWC	TUT Stadium, Pretoria
18:30		Report; Scoreboard

12 March 2018	UFH Blues	18–17	CPUT	Davidson Rugby Field, Alice
18:30		Report; Scoreboard

12 March 2018	UKZN Impi	8–12	WSU All Blacks	Howard College Rugby Stadium, Durban
18:30		Report; Scoreboard

Bye/s: Rhodes

==== Round six ====
15 March 2018	UWC	39–18	UFH Blues	UWC Sport Stadium, Cape Town
18:30		Report; Scoreboard

15 March 2018	WSU All Blacks	12–8	TUT Vikings	Buffalo City Stadium, East London
18:30		Report; Scoreboard

15 March 2018	CPUT	50–10	Rhodes	CPUT Sports Stadium, Cape Town
18:30		Report; Scoreboard

Bye/s: UKZN Impi

==== Round seven ====
19 March 2018	UKZN Impi	34–29	CPUT	Peter Booysen Sports Park, Pietermaritzburg
18:00		Report; Scoreboard

19 March 2018	TUT Vikings	21–18	UFH Blues	TUT Stadium, Pretoria
18:00		Report; Scoreboard

19 March 2018	Rhodes	15–58	UWC	Rhodes Great Field, Grahamstown
18:00		Report; Scoreboard

Bye/s: WSU All Blacks

=== Play-offs ===
==== Semifinals ====
26 March 2018	WSU All Blacks	30–21	UKZN Impi	Buffalo City Stadium, East London
18:30		Report; Scoreboard

26 March 2018	UWC	66–7	TUT Vikings	UWC Sport Stadium, Cape Town
18:30		Report; Scoreboard

==== Final ====
9 April 2018	UWC	55–10	WSU All Blacks	UWC Sport Stadium, Cape Town
19:00		Report; Scoreboard

== See also ==
- 2018 Varsity Cup
- 2018 Varsity Rugby
