= 2018 Varsity Cup =

- Countries: South Africa
- Date: 29 January – 16 April 2018
- Champions: Maties (4th title)
- Runners-up: NWU Pukke
- Relegated: NMU Madibaz
- Top try scorer: Duncan Saal (10 - Maties)

The 2018 Varsity Cup was contested from 29 January to 16 April 2018. The tournament (known as the FNB Varsity Cup for sponsorship reasons) was the eleventh season of the Varsity Cup, an annual inter-university rugby union competition featuring South African universities.

== Competition rules and information ==
There were nine participating universities in the 2018 Varsity Cup. During the round-robin stage of the competition, these teams played each other once over the course of the season, either home or away. Teams received four points for a win and two points for a draw. Bonus points were awarded to teams that scored four or more tries in a game, as well as to teams that lost a match by seven points or less. Teams were ranked by log points, then points difference (points scored less points conceded).

The top four teams qualified for the title play-offs. In the semi-finals, the team that finished first had home advantage against the team that received fourth, while the team that finished second had home advantage against the team that finished third. The winners of these semi-finals played each other in the final, at the home venue of the higher-placed team.

Tries were worth five or seven points, depending on the point where the try-scoring move originated. If the try-scoring move originated in the opponents' half, it would count five points. If the move originated in the try-scoring team's own half, two bonus points were awarded and the try would be worth seven points.

For the 2018 season, the Varsity Cup introduced a Power Play rule; when a team calls for the Power Play, they can nominate two opposition backline players to be removed from the field of play for a period of three minutes.

== Teams ==
Location of teams in the 2018 Varsity Cup

The following teams took part in the 2018 Varsity Cup competition:

2018 Varsity Cup teams
Team name	University	Stadium
CUT Ixias	Central University of Technology	CUT Stadium, Bloemfontein
Maties	Stellenbosch University	Danie Craven Stadium, Stellenbosch
NMU Madibaz	Nelson Mandela University	NMU Stadium, Port Elizabeth
NWU Pukke	North-West University	Fanie du Toit Sport Ground, Potchefstroom
UCT Ikey Tigers	University of Cape Town	UCT Rugby Fields, Cape Town
UFS Shimlas	University of the Free State	Shimla Park, Bloemfontein
UJ	University of Johannesburg	UJ Stadium, Johannesburg
UP Tuks	University of Pretoria	LC de Villiers Stadium, Pretoria
Wits	University of the Witwatersrand	Wits Rugby Stadium, Johannesburg

== Standings ==
The final standings for the 2018 Varsity Cup were:

2018 Varsity Cup standings
Pos	Team	P	W	D	L	PF	PA	PD	TF	TA	TB	LB	Pts
1	Maties	8	6	2	0	301	129	+172	40	16	6	0	34
2	NWU Pukke	8	6	1	1	304	156	+148	39	21	6	1	33
3	UJ	8	5	1	2	261	154	+107	31	22	4	1	27
4	Wits	8	4	1	3	241	230	+11	33	29	6	1	25
5	UFS Shimlas	8	5	0	3	246	284	-38	33	38	4	0	24
6	UCT Ikey Tigers	8	4	0	4	182	181	+1	23	24	2	3	21
7	UP Tuks	8	2	1	5	257	208	+49	35	26	3	2	15
8	CUT Ixias	8	1	0	7	178	435	-257	24	55	3	1	8
9	NMU Madibaz	8	0	0	8	139	332	−193	17	44	1	3	4

Legend and competition rules
Legend:
Top four teams; qualified to the semi-finals.	P = Games played, W = Games won, D = Games drawn, L = Games lost, PF = Points for, PA = Points against, PD = Points difference, TF = Tries for, TA = Tries against, TB = Try bonus points, LB = Losing bonus points, Pts = Log points
To relegation play-off.	P = Games played, W = Games won, D = Games drawn, L = Games lost, PF = Points for, PA = Points against, PD = Points difference, TF = Tries for, TA = Tries against, TB = Try bonus points, LB = Losing bonus points, Pts = Log points
Relegated to the 2019 Varsity Shield.	P = Games played, W = Games won, D = Games drawn, L = Games lost, PF = Points for, PA = Points against, PD = Points difference, TF = Tries for, TA = Tries against, TB = Try bonus points, LB = Losing bonus points, Pts = Log points
Competition rules:
Play-offs: The top four teams qualified to the semi-finals. The first-placed team hosted the fourth-placed team and the second-placed team hosted the third-placed team. The higher-ranked semi-final winner then hosted the lower-ranked semi-final winner in the final. Points breakdown: * 4 points for a win * 2 points for a draw * 1 bonus point for a loss by seven points or less * 1 bonus point for scoring four or more tries in a match

== Pool Stages ==
The following matches were played in the 2018 Varsity Cup:

=== Round one ===
29 January 2018	UP Tuks	17–19	UFS Shimlas	LC de Villiers Stadium, Pretoria
16:45

29 January 2018	UCT Ikey Tigers	26–30	Wits	UCT Rugby Fields, Cape Town
18:30

29 January 2018	NWU Pukke	70–7	CUT Ixias	Fanie du Toit Sport Ground, Potchefstroom
18:30

29 January 2018	UJ	3–31	Maties	UJ Stadium, Johannesburg
19:00

Bye/s: NMU Madibaz

=== Round two ===
5 February 2018	NMU Madibaz	17–27	UCT Ikey Tigers	NMU Stadium, Port Elizabeth
16:45

5 February 2018	Maties	56–21	UFS Shimlas	Danie Craven Stadium, Stellenbosch
18:30

5 February 2018	UJ	48–21	CUT Ixias	UJ Stadium, Johannesburg
18:30

5 February 2018	Wits	25–19	UP Tuks	Wits Rugby Stadium, Johannesburg
19:00

Bye/s: NWU Pukke

=== Round three ===
12 February 2018	CUT Ixias	38–37	NMU Madibaz	CUT Stadium, Bloemfontein
16:45

12 February 2018	UFS Shimlas	44–24	Wits	Shimla Park, Bloemfontein
18:30

12 February 2018	UCT Ikey Tigers	18–15	NWU Pukke	UCT Rugby Fields, Cape Town
18:30

12 February 2018	Maties	24–16	UP Tuks	Danie Craven Stadium, Stellenbosch
19:00

Bye/s: UJ

=== Round four ===
19 February 2018	NMU Madibaz	29–32	Wits	NMU Stadium, Port Elizabeth
16:45

19 February 2018	Maties	75–12	CUT Ixias	Danie Craven Stadium, Stellenbosch
18:30

19 February 2018	UCT Ikey Tigers	27–32	UFS Shimlas	UCT Rugby Fields, Cape Town
18:30

19 February 2018	NWU Pukke	18–15	UJ	Fanie du Toit Sport Ground, Potchefstroom
19:00

Bye/s: UP Tuks

=== Round five ===
26 February 2018	Wits	30–30	Maties	Wits Rugby Stadium, Johannesburg
16:45

26 February 2018	UCT Ikey Tigers	23–13	UP Tuks	UCT Rugby Fields, Cape Town
18:30

26 February 2018	NMU Madibaz	5–37	NWU Pukke	NMU Stadium, Port Elizabeth
18:30

26 February 2018	UFS Shimlas	12–49	UJ	Shimla Park, Bloemfontein
19:00

Bye/s: CUT Ixias

=== Round six ===
5 March 2018	UP Tuks	26–40	NWU Pukke	LC de Villiers Stadium, Pretoria
16:45

5 March 2018	UJ	69–8	NMU Madibaz	UJ Stadium, Johannesburg
18:30

5 March 2018	CUT Ixias	18–52	Wits	CUT Stadium, Bloemfontein
18:30

5 March 2018	Maties	33–14	UCT Ikey Tigers	Danie Craven Stadium, Stellenbosch
19:00

Bye/s: UFS Shimlas

=== Round seven ===
12 March 2018	Wits	17–29	UJ	Wits Rugby Stadium, Johannesburg
16:45

12 March 2018	CUT Ixias	26–54	UP Tuks	CUT Stadium, Bloemfontein
18:30

12 March 2018	NMU Madibaz	0–19	Maties	NMU Stadium, Port Elizabeth
18:30

12 March 2018	NWU Pukke	56–21	UFS Shimlas	Fanie du Toit Sport Ground, Potchefstroom
19:00

Bye/s: UCT Ikey Tigers

=== Round eight ===
19 March 2018	CUT Ixias	23–30	UCT Ikey Tigers	CUT Stadium, Bloemfontein
16:45

19 March 2018	UFS Shimlas	28–22	NMU Madibaz	Shimla Park, Bloemfontein
18:30

19 March 2018	Wits	31–35	NWU Pukke	Wits Rugby Stadium, Johannesburg
18:30

19 March 2018	UP Tuks	30–30	UJ	LC de Villiers Stadium, Pretoria
19:00

Bye/s: Maties

=== Round nine ===
26 March 2018	UFS Shimlas	69–33	CUT Ixias	Shimla Park, Bloemfontein
16:45

26 March 2018	UP Tuks	82–21	NMU Madibaz	LC de Villiers Stadium, Pretoria
18:30

26 March 2018	UJ	18–17	UCT Ikey Tigers	UJ Stadium, Johannesburg
18:30

26 March 2018	NWU Pukke	33–33	Maties	Fanie du Toit Sport Ground, Potchefstroom
19:00

Bye/s: Wits

== Play-offs ==
Semi-finals
2 April 2018
NWU Pukke	60
UJ	31
2 April 2018
Maties	65
Wits	18

Final
16 April 2018
Maties	40
NWU Pukke	07

=== Semi-finals ===
2 April 2018
16:30

NWU Pukke	60–31	UJ

Fanie du Toit Sport Ground, Potchefstroom

2 April 2018
19:00

Maties	65–18	Wits

Danie Craven Stadium, Stellenbosch

=== Final ===
16 April 2018
19:00

Maties	40–7	NWU Pukke
Try: van der Merwe; Momsen; Hartzenberg; Nwagbara; Con: Smith (4); Drop: Smith		Try: Bezuidenhout; Con: Hugo

Danie Craven Stadium, Stellenbosch

Maties	NWU Eagles

FB	15	Carlisle Nel
RW	14	Duncan Saal
OC	13	Michal Haznar
IC	12	Chris Smit
LW	11	Edwill van der Merwe
FH	10	Christopher Smith
SH	9	Remu Malan
N8	8	Marno Redelinghuys
OF	7	Chris Massyn
BF	6	Johann van Niekerk
RL	5	Johan Momsen
LL	4	Ernst van Rhyn
TP	3	Neethling Fouche
HK	2	Wilmar Arnoldi
LP	1	Chippie Oelofse (c)
Replacements:
	16	HJ Luus
	17	Ricky Nwagbara
	18	Piet Strauss
	19	Brandon Valentyn
	20	Stefan Streicher
	21	Brandon Nel
	22	Munier Hartzenberg
	23	Jordan Chait
Coach:
Hawies Fourie

FB	15	Tapiwa Mafura
RW	14	Jimmy Mpailane
OC	13	Evardi Boshoff
IC	12	Akhona Nela
LW	11	Dean Stokes
FH	10	Schalk Hugo
SH	9	Chriswill September
N8	8	Tiaan Bezuidenhout
OF	7	Estehan Visagie
BF	6	Gideon van der Merwe
RL	5	Walt Steenkamp
LL	4	Johan Retief (c)
TP	3	Robert Hunt
HK	2	Louis van der Westhuizen
LP	1	Matimu Manganyi
Replacements:
	16	Percy Mngadi
	17	Nelius Theron
	18	Theodore Ferreira
	19	Jaco Swanepoel
	20	Wandile Mazibuko
	21	Nkosana Mbatha
	22	Henko Marais
	23	Justin Newman
Coach:
Jonathan Mokuena

Player of the Match:
Johann van Niekerk Maties

== See also ==
- Varsity Cup
- 2018 Varsity Rugby
- 2018 Varsity Shield
