= 2019 Varsity Cup =

Rugby competition in South Africa

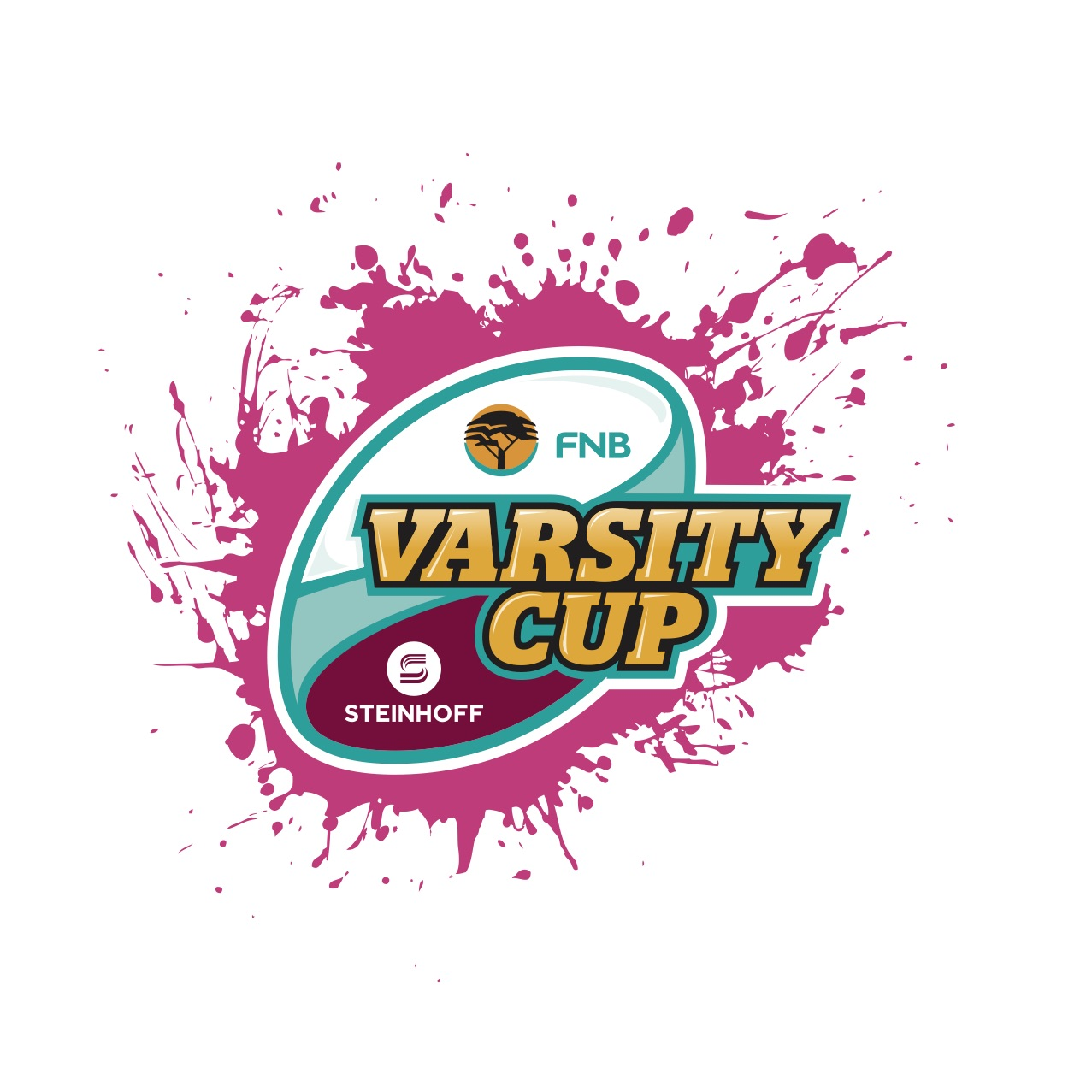
- Countries: South Africa
- Date: 4 February – 22 April 2019
- Champions: Maties (5th title)
- Runners-up: UP Tuks
- Top point scorer: Jordan Chait (125 - Maties)
- Top try scorer: Andre Manuel (8 - UWC)

The 2019 Varsity Cup was the 12th season of the Varsity Cup, the top competition in the annual Varsity Rugby series. It was played between 4 February and 22 April 2019 and featured nine university teams.

There was a debut in the competition for UWC, who won promotion from the Varsity Shield in 2018.

== Competition rules and information ==
There were nine participating university teams in the 2019 Varsity Cup. They played each other once during the pool stage, either at home or away. Teams received four points for a win and two points for a draw. Bonus points were awarded to teams that scored four or more tries in a game, as well as to teams that lost a match by seven points or less. Teams were ranked by log points, then points difference (points scored less points conceded).

The top four teams after the pool stage qualified for the semifinals, which were followed by a final.

== Teams ==
Location of teams in the 2019 Varsity Cup
Western Cape

The teams that played in the 2019 Varsity Cup are:

2019 Varsity Cup teams
| Team name | University | Stadium |
|---|---|---|
| CUT Ixias | Central University of Technology | CUT Stadium, Bloemfontein |
| Maties | Stellenbosch University | Danie Craven Stadium, Stellenbosch |
| NWU Pukke | North-West University | Fanie du Toit Sport Ground, Potchefstroom |
| UCT Ikey Tigers | University of Cape Town | UCT Rugby Fields, Cape Town |
| UFS Shimlas | University of the Free State | Shimla Park, Bloemfontein |
| UJ | University of Johannesburg | UJ Stadium, Johannesburg |
| UP Tuks | University of Pretoria | LC de Villiers Stadium, Pretoria |
| UWC | University of the Western Cape | UWC Sport Stadium, Cape Town |
| Wits | University of the Witwatersrand | Wits Rugby Stadium, Johannesburg |

== Pool stage ==
=== Standings ===
The final log for the 2019 Varsity Cup was:

2019 Varsity Cup log
| Pos | Team | P | W | D | L | PF | PA | PD | TF | TA | TB | LB | Pts |
|---|---|---|---|---|---|---|---|---|---|---|---|---|---|
| 1 | Maties | 8 | 8 | 0 | 0 | 385 | 129 | +256 | 52 | 18 | 6 | 0 | 38 |
| 2 | UP Tuks | 8 | 6 | 1 | 1 | 284 | 115 | +169 | 38 | 14 | 3 | 1 | 30 |
| 3 | NWU Pukke | 8 | 6 | 0 | 2 | 267 | 152 | +115 | 35 | 18 | 5 | 0 | 29 |
| 4 | UFS Shimlas | 8 | 4 | 0 | 4 | 245 | 255 | -10 | 34 | 35 | 5 | 1 | 22 |
| 5 | UCT Ikey Tigers | 8 | 3 | 1 | 4 | 227 | 262 | −35 | 30 | 34 | 5 | 1 | 20 |
| 6 | Wits | 8 | 3 | 0 | 5 | 215 | 309 | −94 | 30 | 37 | 3 | 1 | 16 |
| 7 | CUT Ixias | 8 | 3 | 0 | 5 | 156 | 276 | −120 | 17 | 39 | 2 | 0 | 14 |
| 8 | UJ | 8 | 1 | 0 | 7 | 159 | 239 | −80 | 20 | 31 | 2 | 1 | 7 |
| 9 | UWC | 8 | 1 | 0 | 7 | 198 | 399 | −201 | 26 | 56 | 3 | 0 | 7 |
Correct as at 4 April 2019.

Legend and competition rules
Legend:
| Qualified for the semifinals. | P = Games played, W = Games won, D = Games drawn, L = Games lost, PF = Points for, PA = Points against, PD = Points difference, TF = Tries for, TA = Tries against, TB = Try bonus points, LB = Losing bonus points, Pts = Log points |
Competition rules:
Qualification: The top four teams qualified for the semifinals. Points breakdown: * 4 points for a win * 2 points for a draw * 1 bonus point for a loss by seven points or less * 1 bonus point for scoring four or more tries in a match

=== Matches ===
The following matches were played in the 2019 Varsity Cup:

==== Round one ====
| 4 February 2019 | UJ | 8–23 | NWU Pukke | UJ Stadium, Johannesburg |
| 16:45 |

| 4 February 2019 | UCT Ikey Tigers | 32–24 | UWC | UCT Rugby Fields, Cape Town |
| 18:30 |

| 4 February 2019 | UP Tuks | 23–6 | CUT Ixias | LC de Villiers Stadium, Pretoria |
| 18:30 |

| 4 February 2019 | Maties | 33–17 | Wits | Danie Craven Stadium, Stellenbosch |
| 19:00 |

Bye/s: UFS Shimlas

==== Round two ====
| 11 February 2019 | UWC | 25–47 | UFS Shimlas | UWC Sport Stadium, Cape Town |
| 16:45 |

| 11 February 2019 | Wits | 25–15 | CUT Ixias | Wits Rugby Stadium, Johannesburg |
| 18:30 |

| 11 February 2019 | UCT Ikey Tigers | 5–66 | Maties | UCT Rugby Fields, Cape Town |
| 19:00 |

| 12 February 2019 | UJ | 19–40 | UP Tuks | UJ Stadium, Johannesburg |
| 14:00 |

Bye/s: NWU Pukke

==== Round three ====
| 18 February 2019 | CUT Ixias | 27–26 | UJ | CUT Stadium, Bloemfontein |
| 16:45 |

| 18 February 2019 | NWU Pukke | 37–21 | UWC | Fanie du Toit Sport Ground, Potchefstroom |
| 18:30 |

| 18 February 2019 | Wits | 26–33 | UFS Shimlas | Wits Rugby Stadium, Johannesburg |
| 18:30 |

| 18 February 2019 | UP Tuks | 24–26 | Maties | LC de Villiers Stadium, Pretoria |
| 19:00 |

Bye/s: UCT Ikey Tigers

==== Round four ====
| 25 February 2019 | UCT Ikey Tigers | 42–23 | UJ | UCT Rugby Fields, Cape Town |
| 16:45 |

| 25 February 2019 | CUT Ixias | 15–50 | Maties | CUT Stadium, Bloemfontein |
| 18:30 |

| 25 February 2019 | UP Tuks | 46–12 | Wits | LC de Villiers Stadium, Pretoria |
| 18:30 |

| 25 February 2019 | UFS Shimlas | 13–26 | NWU Pukke | Shimla Park, Bloemfontein |
| 19:00 |

Bye/s: UWC

==== Round five ====
| 4 March 2019 | UJ | 39–16 | Wits | UJ Stadium, Johannesburg |
| 16:45 |

| 4 March 2019 | UFS Shimlas | 51–40 | UCT Ikey Tigers | Shimla Park, Bloemfontein |
| 18:30 |

| 4 March 2019 | UWC | 12–70 | UP Tuks | UWC Sport Stadium, Cape Town |
| 18:30 |

| 4 March 2019 | Maties | 43–15 | NWU Pukke | Danie Craven Stadium, Stellenbosch |
| 19:00 |

Bye/s: CUT Ixias

==== Round six ====
| 11 March 2019 | UWC | 21–38 | CUT Ixias | UWC Sport Stadium, Cape Town |
| 16:45 |

| 11 March 2019 | Maties | 24–13 | UJ | Danie Craven Stadium, Stellenbosch |
| 18:30 |

| 11 March 2019 | NWU Pukke | 32–17 | UCT Ikey Tigers | Fanie du Toit Sport Ground, Potchefstroom |
| 18:30 |

| 11 March 2019 | UFS Shimlas | 14–27 | UP Tuks | Shimla Park, Bloemfontein |
| 19:00 |

Bye/s: Wits

==== Round seven ====
| 18 March 2019 | Wits | 30–29 | UCT Ikey Tigers | Wits Rugby Stadium, Johannesburg |
| 16:45 |

| 18 March 2019 | UWC | 29–17 | UJ | UWC Sport Stadium, Cape Town |
| 18:30 |

| 18 March 2019 | CUT Ixias | 38–35 | UFS Shimlas | CUT Stadium, Bloemfontein |
| 18:30 |

| 18 March 2019 | NWU Pukke | 0–28 | UP Tuks | Fanie du Toit Sport Ground, Potchefstroom |
| 19:00 |

Bye/s: Maties

==== Round eight ====
| 25 March 2019 | UP Tuks | 26–26 | UCT Ikey Tigers | LC de Villiers Stadium, Pretoria |
| 16:45 |

| 25 March 2019 | CUT Ixias | 7–60 | NWU Pukke | CUT Stadium, Bloemfontein |
| 18:30 |

| 25 March 2019 | Wits | 74–40 | UWC | Wits Rugby Stadium, Johannesburg |
| 18:30 |

| 25 March 2019 | UFS Shimlas | 14–59 | Maties | Shimla Park, Bloemfontein |
| 19:00 |

Bye/s: UJ

==== Round nine ====
| 1 April 2019 | UCT Ikey Tigers | 36–10 | CUT Ixias | UCT Rugby Fields, Cape Town |
| 16:45 |

| 1 April 2019 | UJ | 14–38 | UFS Shimlas | UJ Stadium, Johannesburg |
| 18:30 |

| 1 April 2019 | Maties | 84–26 | UWC | Danie Craven Stadium, Stellenbosch |
| 18:30 |

| 1 April 2019 | NWU Pukke | 74–15 | Wits | Fanie du Toit Sport Ground, Potchefstroom |
| 19:00 |

Bye/s: UP Tuks

== Play-offs ==
Semi-final
8 April
UP Tuks | 24
NWU Pukke | 18
8 April
Maties | 47
UFS Shimlas | 5

Final
15 April
UP Tuks | 12
Maties | 34

=== Semi-finals ===
| 8 April 2019 | UP Tuks | 24–18 | NWU Pukke | LC de Villiers Stadium, Pretoria |
| 16:45 |

| 8 April 2019 | Maties | 47–5 | UFS Shimlas | Danie Craven Stadium, Stellenbosch |
| 19:00 |

=== Final ===
15 April 2019
19:00

| Maties | 34–12 | UP Tuks |
| Try: van Niekerk (2); Hartzenberg (2); Con: Chait (3); Pen: Chait (p) (2) | Report | Try: Naude (2); Con: de Beer |

Danie Craven Stadium, Stellenbosch

| Maties | Tuks |

| FB | 15 | Reinhardt Fortuin |
| RW | 14 | Munier Hartzenberg |
| OC | 13 | David Brits |
| IC | 12 | Chris Smit |
| LW | 11 | Edwill van der Merwe |
| FH | 10 | Jordan Chait |
| SH | 9 | Remu Malan |
| N8 | 8 | Stephan Streicher |
| OF | 7 | Chris Massyn (c) |
| BF | 6 | Johann van Niekerk |
| RL | 5 | Ben-Jason Dixon |
| LL | 4 | Zirk Jansen |
| TP | 3 | Sazi Sandi |
| HK | 2 | Daniel Jooste |
| LP | 1 | Wayrin Losper |
Replacements:
| | 16 | HJ Luus |
| | 17 | Leon Lyons |
| | 18 | Piet Strauss |
| | 19 | Mitchell Carstens |
| | 20 | Jesse Johnson |
| | 21 | Brendon Nell |
| | 22 | Anton du Toit |
| | 23 | Carlisle Nel |
Coach:
Hawies Fourie

| FB | 15 | Vaughen Isaacs |
| RW | 14 | Dewald Naude |
| OC | 13 | Lourens Pretorius |
| IC | 12 | Erich Cronje |
| LW | 11 | Irvin Ali |
| FH | 10 | Tinus de Beer |
| SH | 9 | Theo Maree |
| N8 | 8 | Denzel Hill |
| OF | 7 | Hanru Sirgel |
| BF | 6 | Stephan Smit |
| RL | 5 | Ruan Nortje |
| LL | 4 | Marius Verwey (c) |
| TP | 3 | Jean-Pierre Smith |
| HK | 2 | Johan Grobbelaar |
| LP | 1 | Etienne Janeke |
Replacements:
| | 16 | Werner Fourie |
| | 17 | Jacobus Eloff |
| | 18 | Bart le Roux |
| | 19 | Brian Leitch |
| | 20 | Raegan Oranje |
| | 21 | Damian Bonaparte |
| | 22 | Xolisa Guma |
| | 23 | Ewart Potgieter |
Coach:
Nico Luus

Player of the Match:
Johann van Niekerk Maties

== North v South match ==
After the season, a further match was played between a selection of players from the northern universities — CUT Ixias, NWU Pukke, UJ, UP Tuks and Wits — and a selection of players from the southern universities — Maties, UCT Ikey Tigers, UFS Shimlas and UWC:

| 22 April 2019 | North | – | South |
