= 2013 Varsity Shield =

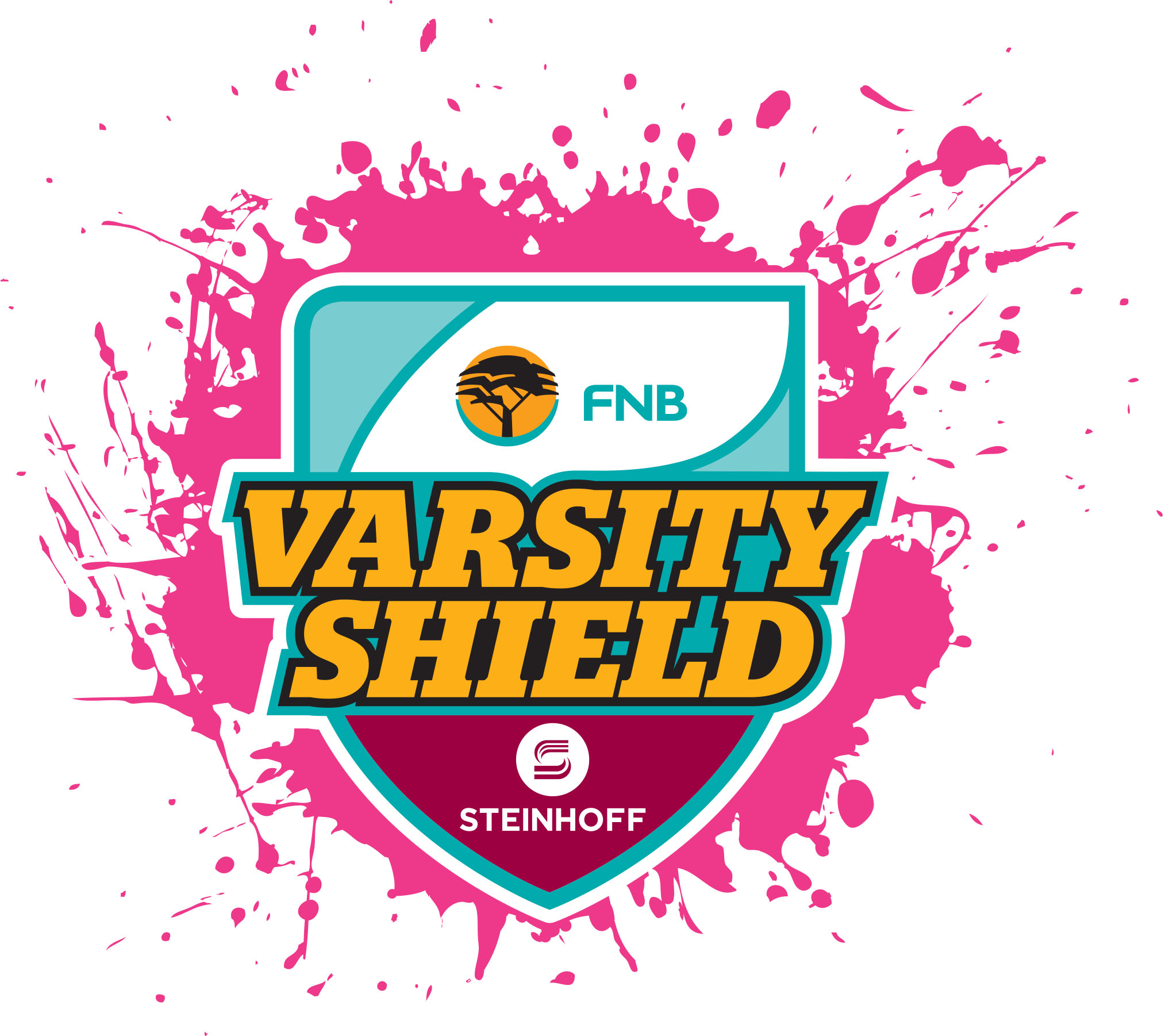
- Countries: South Africa
- Date: 28 January – 1 April 2013
- Champions: CUT Ixias (2nd title)
- Runners-up: UWC
- Promoted: None
- Matches played: 21
- Tries scored: 147 (average 7 per match)
- Top point scorer: Freddie Muller (70)
- Top try scorer: Inus Kritzinger (7)

The 2013 Varsity Shield was contested from 28 January to 1 April 2013. The tournament (also known as the FNB Varsity Shield presented by Steinhoff International for sponsorship reasons) was the third season of the Varsity Shield, an annual second-tier inter-university rugby union competition featuring five South African universities.

The tournament was won by CUT Ixias for the second time; they beat UWC 29–19 in the final played on 1 April 2013. No team was promoted to the top-tier Varsity Cup competition for 2014.

== Competition rules and information ==
There were five participating universities in the 2013 Varsity Shield. These teams played each other twice over the course of the season, once at home and once away.

Teams received four points for a win and two points for a draw. Bonus points were awarded to teams that scored four or more tries in a game, as well as to teams that lost a match by seven points or less. Teams were ranked by log points, then points difference (points scored less points conceded).

The top two teams qualified for the title play-offs. The team that finished first had home advantage against the team that finished second.

There was no promotion/relegation between the Varsity Cup and the Varsity Shield at the end of 2013.

The 2013 Varsity Shield used a different scoring system than the common scoring system. Tries were worth five points as usual, but conversions were worth three points instead of two, while penalties and drop goals were only worth two points instead of three.

== Teams ==
Location of teams in the 2013 Varsity Shield

The following teams took part in the 2013 Varsity Shield competition:

2013 Varsity Shield teams
Team name	University	Stadium
CUT Ixias	Central University of Technology	CUT Stadium, Bloemfontein
TUT Vikings	Tshwane University of Technology	TUT Stadium, Pretoria
UFH Blues	University of Fort Hare	Davidson Rugby Field, Alice
UKZN Impi	University of KwaZulu-Natal	Peter Booysen Sports Park, Pietermaritzburg
UWC	University of the Western Cape	UWC Sport Stadium, Cape Town

== Standings ==
The final league standings for the 2013 Varsity Shield were:

2013 Varsity Shield Log
Pos	Team	Pl	W	D	L	PF	PA	PD	TF	TA	TB	LB	Pts
1	CUT Ixias	8	8	0	0	296	159	+137	41	19	5	0	37
2	UWC	8	4	0	4	225	160	+65	28	19	4	1	21
3	UKZN Impi	8	4	0	4	143	215	−72	17	29	0	0	16
4	UFH Blues	8	3	0	5	159	194	−35	20	24	2	1	15
5	TUT Vikings	8	1	0	7	122	217	−95	12	27	1	3	8
* Legend: Pos = Position, Pl = Played, W = Won, D = Drawn, L = Lost, PF = Points for, PA = Points against, PD = Points difference, TF = Tries For, TA = Tries Against, TB = Try bonus points, LB = Losing bonus points, Pts = Log points CUT Ixias and UKZN Impi qualified to the final. Points breakdown: *4 points for a win *2 points for a draw *1 bonus point for a loss by seven points or less *1 bonus point for scoring four or more tries in a match

== Fixtures ==
The 2013 Varsity Shield fixtures were as follows:

- All times are South African (GMT+2).

=== Round one ===
28 January 2013	UKZN Impi	19 – 7	UFH Blues	Peter Booysen Sports Park, Pietermaritzburg
16:45	Try: Robert Warnock 3'; Gerrit Fourie 62'; Con: Heinrich Meyer 4' (1/2); Pen: Heinrich Meyer (0/1); Jaco Potgieter 65', 70', 77' (3/3)	Scoreboard	Try: Oliver Zono 26'; Con: Oliver Zono (0/1); Pen: Oliver Zono 14' (1/2)	Referee: B. Beattie

28 January 2013	UWC	42 – 4	TUT Vikings	UWC Sport Stadium, Cape Town
19:00	Try: Tazz Fuzani 42'; Freddie Muller 50'; Minenhle Mthethwa 52'; Kenwinn Wiener 62'; Godlen Masimla 69'; Con: Charl van Vollenhoven 43', 51', 53', 62', 70' (5/5); Pen: Charl van Vollenhoven 25' (1/1); Cards: Tazz Fuzani (yellow card) 11' to 21'	Scoreboard	Pen: Morné Hugo 23', 27' (2/3); Drop: Morné Hugo (0/1)	Referee: Renier Vermeulen

Bye/s: CUT Ixias

=== Round two ===
31 January 2013	CUT Ixias	25 – 10	UWC	CUT Stadium, Bloemfontein
19:00	Try: Johan van Schalkwyk 29'; Alec Mhlanga 47'; Inus Kritzinger 60'; Con: Noël Marx 30', 61' (2/3); Pen: Noël Marx 35', 7' (2/4); Cards: Leon Pretorius (yellow card) 22' to 32'	Scoreboard	Try: Yondela Stampu 71'; Con: Freddie Muller 72' (1/1); Pen: Charl van Vollenhoven 3' (1/1); Cards: Tazz Fuzani (yellow card) 35' to 45'	Attendance: 3,500; Referee: Jaco Kotze

31 January 2013	TUT Vikings	31 – 34	UKZN Impi	TUT Stadium, Pretoria
19:00	Try: Thabo Mangena; Zandré de Bruin; Fanie Raseroka; Con: Morné Hugo; Pen: Morné Hugo	Scoreboard	Try: Jaco Potgieter; Hendrik Groenewald; Con: Jaco Potgieter; Pen: Jaco Potgieter	Referee: Gerrie de Bruin

Bye/s: UFH Blues

=== Round three ===
4 February 2013	UFH Blues	32 – 6	TUT Vikings	Davidson Rugby Field, Alice
19:00	Try: Sibabalwe Mtsulwana 20'; Lundi Ralarala 54'; Garth van Rayner 70'; Khanyiso Komani 79'; Con: Oliver Zono 21' (1/1); Saneliso Ngoma 54', 71' (2/2); Sibabalwe Mtsulwana 79' (1/1); Pen: Oliver Zono (0/1); Cards: Lundi Ralarala (yellow card) 67' to 77'	Scoreboard	Pen: Morné Hugo 6', 10', 48' (3/3); Cards: Fanie Raseroka (yellow card) 74'	Referee: Lusanda Jam

4 February 2013	UKZN Impi	12 – 26	CUT Ixias	Peter Booysen Sports Park, Pietermaritzburg
19:00	Try: Zander Engelbrecht 55'; Con: Jaco Potgieter 55' (1/1); Pen: Jaco Potgieter 2', 28' (2/4); Cards: Brandon Bailing (yellow card) 73'	Scoreboard	Try: Inus Kritzinger 20'; Christoff Swanepoel 67' penalty try 73'; Con: Noël Marx 20' (1/1); Meyer van Tonder 67', 73' (2/2); Pen: Meyer van Tonder 42' (1/1); Cards: Petri Coetzee (yellow card) 39' to 49'	Referee: Archie Sehlako

Bye/s: UWC

=== Round four ===
11 February 2013	CUT Ixias	44 – 29	UFH Blues	CUT Stadium, Bloemfontein
19:00	Try: Petri Coetzee 14'; Meyer van Tonder 26'; Christoff Swanepoel 33'; Anrich Bitzi 46'; Alec Mhlanga 65'; Inus Kritzinger 73'; Con: Meyer van Tonder 15', 27', 47', 74' (4/6); Pen: Christoff Swanepoel 3' (1/1); Cards: Johan van Schalkwyk (yellow card) 79'	Scoreboard	Try: Lundi Ralarala 7', 20'; Lithabile Mgwadleka 48'; Xola Mapapo 77'; Con: Khanyiso Komani 8', 21', 49' (3/3); Saneliso Ngoma (0/1); Cards: Sibabalwe Tshoni (yellow card) 12' to 22'	Attendance: 1,200

11 February 2013	UWC	38 – 15	UKZN Impi	UWC Sport Stadium, Cape Town
19:00	Try: Donovan Williams 2'; Freddie Muller 19', 22'; Heinrich Marcus 30', 51', 74'; Con: Freddie Muller 52' (1/4); Warrick Rhoda (0/1); Charl van Vollenhoven 75' (1/1); Pen: Charl van Vollenhoven 66' (1/1); Cards: Tazz Fuzani (yellow card) 36' to 46', (red card) 60'	Scoreboard	Try: André Greyvenstein 39'; Theo Kruger 46'; Con: Heinrich Meyer 40' (1/2); Drop: Heinrich Meyer 12' (1/1); Cards: Jeandré Small (yellow card) 78'	Referee: François Groenewald

Bye/s: TUT Vikings

=== Round five ===
18 February 2013	TUT Vikings	16 – 24	CUT Ixias	TUT Stadium, Pretoria
19:00	Try: Dawid Roux 64'; Deon Fitchet 76'; Con: Morné Hugo 65', 77' (2/2)	Scoreboard	Try: Moekoa Bolofo 30'; Noël Marx 36'; Alec Mhlanga 55'; Con: Meyer van Tonder 30', 37', 55' (3/3); Pen: Noël Marx (0/1); Cards: Dean Kauprihanoff (yellow card) 72'	Attendance: 350; Referee: Ricus van der Hoven

18 February 2013	UFH Blues	24 – 23	UWC	Davidson Rugby Field, Alice
19:00	Try: Nkosi Nofuma 17'; Lundi Ralarala 52'; Con: Khanyiso Komani 18', 52' (2/2); Pen: Khanyiso Komani 11', 29', 55', 73' (4/5)	Scoreboard	Try: Justin McKay 22'; Kenwinn Wiener 27'; Donovan Williams 32'; Con: Freddie Muller 27', 33' (2/3); Pen: Charl van Vollenhoven 39' (1/1)	Referee: Rodney Boneparte

Bye/s: UKZN Impi

=== Round six ===
25 February 2013	UFH Blues	18 – 20	UKZN Impi	Davidson Rugby Field, Alice
19:00	Try: Khanyiso Komani 4'; Nkosi Nofuma 57', 72'; Con: Khanyiso Komani 73' (1/3)	Scoreboard	Try: Sizwe Kubheka 38'; Jeandré Small 43'; Leon Mulder 67'; Con: Heinrich Meyer 39' (1/3); Pen: Heinrich Meyer 13' (1/4); Cards: Sizwe Kubheka (yellow card) 64'	Attendance: 23,250; Referee: Jadezweni Cwengile

25 February 2013	TUT Vikings	18 – 8	UWC	TUT Stadium, Pretoria
19:00	Try: Paul Walters 4'; Fanie Raseroka 42'; Con: Morné Hugo 4', 43' (2/2); Pen: Morné Hugo 53' (1/1); Drop: Morné Hugo (0/1); Cards: Terry Long (yellow card) 50' to 61'	Scoreboard	Try: Kenwinn Wiener 68'; Con: Charl van Vollenhoven 68' (1/1)	Attendance: 250; Referee: Tahla Ntshakaza

Bye/s: CUT Ixias

=== Round seven ===
4 March 2013	UWC	40 – 49	CUT Ixias	UWC Sport Stadium, Cape Town
19:00	Try: Donovan Williams 17'; Justin McKay 33'; Kenwinn Wiener 58'; Kelvin de Bruyn 65'; Quade Langeveld 78'; Con: Charl van Vollenhoven 18', 34' (2/2); Freddie Muller 59', 66', 79' (3/3); Pen: Charl van Vollenhoven (0/2); Cards: Freddie Muller (yellow card) 15' to 25'	Scoreboard	Try: Meyer van Tonder 12'; Johan van Schalkwyk 21', 36' penalty try 26'; Leon Pretorius 30', 46'; Rudi Fuls 67'; Con: Noël Marx 13', 27', 47' (3/6); Meyer van Tonder 68' (1/1); Pen: Noël Marx 18' (1/2); Cards: Deon Gouws (yellow card) 8' to 18'	Referee: Juan Sylvestre

4 March 2013	UKZN Impi	10 – 9	TUT Vikings	Peter Booysen Sports Park, Pietermaritzburg
19:00	Try: Mondli Ntshingila 42'; Rico Lategan 48'; Con: Heinrich Meyer (0/2); Pen: Heinrich Meyer (0/2)	Scoreboard	Try: Oswald Gibson 68'; Con: Oswald Gibson (0/1); Pen: Morné Hugo 22', 51' (2/2); Cards: Werner Lourens (yellow card) 60' to 70'	Attendance: 1,500; Referee: Daniel Fortuin

Bye/s: UFH Blues

=== Round eight ===
11 March 2013	TUT Vikings	18 – 25	UFH Blues	TUT Stadium, Pretoria
19:00	Try: Werner Lourens 70'; Con: Morné Hugo 71' (1/1); Pen: Morné Hugo 2', 30', 46', 74' (4/4); Drop: Morné Hugo 34' (1/1); Cards: Werner Lourens (yellow card) 26' to 36'	Scoreboard	Try: Garth van Rayner 31'; Oliver Zono 49', 75'; Con: Khanyiso Komani 32', 76' (2/3); Pen: Khanyiso Komani 21' (1/2); Drop: Oliver Zono 16' (1/1); Cards: Billy Dutton (yellow card) 51' to 61'	Attendance: 500; Referee: Stephan Geldenhuys

11 March 2013	CUT Ixias	50 – 20	UKZN Impi	CUT Stadium, Bloemfontein
19:00	Try: Deon Gouws 14', 29'; Inus Kritzinger 19', 49'; Charles Hitchcock 63'; Kholo Ramashala 67'; Meyer van Tonder 77'; Con: Noël Marx 15', 20', 30', 50', 68' (5/6); Meyer van Tonder (0/1); Cards: Juan Hugo (yellow card) 76'	Scoreboard	Try: Jeandré Small 39'; Chris Ndlovu 46'; Con: Heinrich Meyer 40', 47' (2/2); Pen: Heinrich Meyer 53' (1/1); Drop: Heinrich Meyer 4' (1/1); Cards: Hendrik Groenewald (yellow card) 63' to 73'	Attendance: 500; Referee: Eduan Nel

Bye/s: UWC

=== Round nine ===
18 March 2013	UFH Blues	12 – 36	CUT Ixias	Davidson Rugby Field, Alice
19:00	Try: Garth van Rayner 73'; Nkosi Nofuma 8'; Con: Oliver Zono (0/1); Khanyiso Komani (0/1); Pen: Khanyiso Komani 40' (1/1); Cards: Onke Dubase (yellow card) 45' to 54'	Scoreboard	Try: Meyer van Tonder 41', 32'; Deon Gouws 45', 80'; Juan Hugo 10'; Alec Mhlanga 29'; Con: Meyer van Tonder 33' (1/3); Noël Marx 81' (1/2); Leon Pretorius (0/1); Cards: Rudi Fuls (yellow card) 40' to 50'	Referee: Rodney Boneparte

18 March 2013	UKZN Impi	13 – 36	UWC	Peter Booysen Sports Park, Pietermaritzburg
19:00	Try: Zwele Zondi 19'; Jeandré Small 63'; Con: Heinrich Meyer 19' (1/2)	Scoreboard	Try: Justin McKay 5', 25'; Denzel Willemse 55'; Minenhle Mthethwa 77'; Con: Freddie Muller 5', 25', 55', 77' (4/4); Pen: Freddie Muller 57' (1/1); Drop: Freddie Muller 14' (1/1); Cards: Kelvin de Bruyn (yellow card) 28' to 38'	Attendance: 1,000

Bye/s: TUT Vikings

=== Round ten ===
25 March 2013	CUT Ixias	42 – 20	TUT Vikings	CUT Stadium, Bloemfontein
19:00	Try: Johan van Schalkwyk 4'; Meyer van Tonder 11'; Johan Klopper 32'; Inus Kritzinger 59'; Danie van der Merwe 75'; Deon Gouws 77'; Con: Noël Marx 5', 33', 60', 76' (4/6); Drop: Noël Marx (0/1)	Scoreboard	Try: Paul Walters 15'; Ewald Maré 66'; Con: Morné Hugo 16', 67' (2/2); Pen: Morné Hugo 21', 51' (2/5); Drop: Morné Hugo (0/1)	Attendance: 1,500; Referee: Oregopotse Rametsi

25 March 2013	UWC	28 – 12	UFH Blues	UWC Sport Stadium, Cape Town
19:00	Try: Warrick Rhoda 7'; Njabulo Ndlovu 53'; Heinrich Marcus 74'; Con: Freddie Muller 8', 54', 75' (3/3); Pen: Freddie Muller 59', 61' (2/3); Cards: Kelvin de Bruyn (yellow card) 10' to 20'	Scoreboard	Try: Lundi Ralarala 1'; Con: Khanyiso Komani 2' (1/1); Pen: Khanyiso Komani 20', 21' (2/4); Oliver Zono (0/1)	Referee: Juan Sylvestre

Bye/s: UKZN Impi

=== Final ===
1 April 2013	CUT Ixias	29 – 19	UWC	CUT Stadium, Bloemfontein
16:45	Try: Leon Pretorius 16'; Inus Kritzinger 23'; Alec Mhlanga 73'; Con: Noël Marx (0/2); Meyer van Tonder (0/1); Pen: Noël Marx 7' (1/2); Meyer van Tonder (0/1)	Scoreboard	Try: Heinrich Marcus 31'; Samuel Borsah 56'; Con: Freddie Muller (0/1); Michael September 57' (1/1); Pen: Freddie Muller 44', 49' (2/2); Warrick Rhoda 68' (1/1); Cards: Tazz Fuzani (yellow card) 15' to 26'

== Players ==
=== Squad lists ===
The teams released the following squad lists:

== Honours ==
2013 FNB Varsity Shield Champions:	CUT Ixias
Player That Rocks:	Inus Kritzinger, CUT Ixias
Forward That Rocks:	Billy Dutton, UFH Blues
Back That Rocks:	Freddie Muller, UWC
Top Try Scorers:	Inus Kritzinger, CUT Ixias (7)
Top Points Scorer:	Freddie Muller, UWC (70)

== See also ==
- Varsity Rugby
- 2013 Varsity Rugby
- 2013 Varsity Cup
- 2013 SARU Community Cup
- 2013 Vodacom Cup
