= 2017 Varsity Cup =

- Countries: South Africa
- Date: 30 January – 17 April 2017
- Champions: UP Tuks
- Runners-up: Maties
- Top try scorer: Craig Barry (9 - Maties)

The 2017 Varsity Cup was the 2017 edition of the Varsity Cup, an annual inter-university rugby union competition featuring university sides in South Africa. The tournament – known as the FNB Varsity Cup presented by Steinhoff International for sponsorship reasons – was the tenth season of the Varsity Cup and was contested from 30 January to 17 April 2017.

== Competition rules and information ==
There were nine participating universities in the 2017 Varsity Cup. These teams played each other once over the course of the season, either home or away.

Teams received four points for a win and two points for a draw. Bonus points were awarded to teams that scored four or more tries in a game, as well as to teams that lost a match by seven points or less. Teams were ranked by log points, then points difference (points scored less points conceded).

The top four teams qualified for the title play-offs. In the semi-finals, the team that finished first had home advantage against the team that received fourth, while the team that finished second had home advantage against the team that finished third. The winners of these semi-finals played each other in the final, at the home venue of the higher-placed team.

The Varsity Cup tweaked the scoring system introduced in 2016; under the 2017 rules, tries could be worth five or seven points, depending on the point where the try-scoring move originated. If the try-scoring move originated in the opponents' half, it would count five points. If the move originated in the try-scoring team's own half, two bonus points were awarded and the try would be worth seven points.

== Teams ==
Location of teams in the 2017 Varsity Cup

The following teams took part in the 2017 Varsity Cup competition:

2017 Varsity Cup teams
| Team name | University | Stadium |
|---|---|---|
| CUT Ixias | Central University of Technology | CUT Stadium, Bloemfontein |
| Maties | Stellenbosch University | Danie Craven Stadium, Stellenbosch |
| NMMU Madibaz | Nelson Mandela Metropolitan University | NMMU Stadium, Port Elizabeth |
| NWU Pukke | North-West University | Fanie du Toit Sport Ground, Potchefstroom |
| UCT Ikey Tigers | University of Cape Town | UCT Rugby Fields, Cape Town |
| UFS Shimlas | University of the Free State | Shimla Park, Bloemfontein |
| UJ | University of Johannesburg | UJ Stadium, Johannesburg |
| UP Tuks | University of Pretoria | LC de Villiers Stadium, Pretoria |
| Wits | University of the Witwatersrand | Wits Rugby Stadium, Johannesburg |

== Standings ==
The final standings for the 2017 Varsity Cup were:

2017 Varsity Cup standings
| Pos | Team | P | W | D | L | PF | PA | PD | TF | TA | TB | LB | Pts |
|---|---|---|---|---|---|---|---|---|---|---|---|---|---|
| 1 | UP Tuks | 8 | 7 | 0 | 1 | 347 | 122 | +225 | 46 | 12 | 5 | 1 | 34 |
| 2 | Maties | 8 | 7 | 0 | 1 | 346 | 143 | +203 | 43 | 16 | 5 | 1 | 34 |
| 3 | UJ | 8 | 5 | 0 | 3 | 255 | 228 | +27 | 27 | 28 | 4 | 1 | 25 |
| 4 | UFS Shimlas | 8 | 5 | 0 | 3 | 191 | 240 | −49 | 26 | 33 | 3 | 0 | 23 |
| 5 | Wits | 8 | 4 | 0 | 4 | 197 | 164 | +33 | 24 | 19 | 3 | 2 | 21 |
| 6 | NWU Pukke | 8 | 4 | 0 | 4 | 189 | 203 | −14 | 24 | 23 | 3 | 0 | 19 |
| 7 | NMMU Madibaz | 8 | 2 | 0 | 6 | 170 | 216 | −46 | 21 | 28 | 3 | 0 | 11 |
| 8 | UCT Ikey Tigers | 8 | 2 | 0 | 6 | 140 | 248 | −108 | 17 | 33 | 0 | 1 | 9 |
| 9 | CUT Ixias | 8 | 0 | 0 | 8 | 144 | 415 | −271 | 18 | 53 | 2 | 1 | 3 |

Legend and competition rules
Legend:
| Top four teams; qualified to the semi-finals. | P = Games played, W = Games won, D = Games drawn, L = Games lost, PF = Points for, PA = Points against, PD = Points difference, TF = Tries for, TA = Tries against, TB = Try bonus points, LB = Losing bonus points, Pts = Log points |
Competition rules:
Play-offs: The top four teams qualified to the semi-finals. The first-placed team hosted the fourth-placed team and the second-placed team hosted the third-placed team. The higher-ranked semi-final winner then hosted the lower-ranked semi-final winner in the final. Points breakdown: * 4 points for a win * 2 points for a draw * 1 bonus point for a loss by seven points or less * 1 bonus point for scoring four or more tries in a match

=== Round-by-round ===
The table below shows each team's progression throughout the season. For each round, their cumulative points total is shown with the overall log position in brackets:

Team Progression – 2017 Varsity Cup
| Team | R1 | R2 | R3 | R4 | R5 | R6 | R7 | R8 | R9 | Semi | Final |
|---|---|---|---|---|---|---|---|---|---|---|---|
| Maties | 1 (6th) | 5 (3rd) | 9 (2nd) | 14 | | | | | | | |
| NWU Pukke | 4 (4th) | 9 (2nd) | 9 (4th) | 13 | | | | | | | |
| UP Tuks | 4 (3rd) | 4 (5th) | 9 (3rd) | 10 | | | | | | | |
| UFS Shimlas | 5 (2nd) | 10 (1st) | 10 (1st) | | | | | | | | |
| UCT Ikey Tigers | 0 (9th) | 4 (6th) | 8 (5th) | 9 (5th) | | | | | | | |
| Wits | 1 (7th) | 1 (8th) | 6 (6th) | 6 (6th) | | | | | | | |
| UJ | 1 (5th) | 2 (7th) | 2 (8th) | 6 (7th) | | | | | | | |
| NMMU Madibaz | 5 (1st) | 5 (4th) | 5 (7th) | 5 | 5 | | | | | | |
| CUT Ixias | 0 (8th) | 0 (9th) | 0 (9th) | | | | | | | | |
| Key: | win | draw | loss | bye | | | | | | | |

== Pool stages ==
The following matches were played in the 2017 Varsity Cup:

=== Round one ===
| 30 January 2017 | Wits | 21–26 | UFS Shimlas | Wits Rugby Stadium, Johannesburg |
| 16:45 | Try: Kwanele Ngema 19'; Graham Logan 46'; CJ Conradie 51'; Con: Warren Gilbert 20', 47', 52' (3/3); Cards: Ruan Macdonald (yellow card) 29' to 39'; Kwanele Ngema (yellow card) 77' | Report; Scoreboard | Try: Marco Mason 25'; Dian Badenhorst 31'; Niell Stannard 34' (2BP); Francois Steyn 72'; Con: Marco Mason 32', 73' (2/4); Pen: Marco Mason (0/1); Cards: Nardus Erasmus (yellow card) 50' to 60' | Referee: Stephan Geldenhuys |

| 30 January 2017 | UCT Ikey Tigers | 8–36 | NMMU Madibaz | Florida Park, Parow |
| 18:30 | Try: Cuan Hablutzel 51'; Con: Lohan Lubbe (0/1); Pen: Lohan Lubbe 13' (1/1) | Report; Scoreboard | Try: Luvo Claassen 23'; Kevin Kaba 30'; Jixie Molapo 40' (2BP); Andile Jho 47'; Wynand Grassmann 75'; Con: Simon Bolze 24', 47' (2/4); Tom Kean 40' (1/1); Pen: Simon Bolze 8' (1/1); Cards: Athi Mayinje (yellow card) 70' to 80' | Referee: Ruhan Meiring |

| 30 January 2017 | UJ | 12–16 | NWU Pukke | UJ Stadium, Johannesburg |
| 19:00 | Pen: Divan Nel 22', 28', 30', 40' (4/8); Jaco Fourie (0/1); Drop: Ronald Brown (0/1) | Report; Scoreboard | Try: Jimmy Mpailane 18'; Con: Schalk Hugo 19' (1/1); Pen: Schalk Hugo 13', 63', 73' (3/6) | Referee: Egon Seconds |

| 30 January 2017 | UP Tuks | 13–9 | Maties | Loftus Versfeld, Pretoria |
| 19:00 | Try: Chris Massyn 27'; Tinus de Beer 74'; Con: Tinus de Beer (0/2); Pen: Tinus de Beer 57' (1/2); Cards: Tinus de Beer (yellow card) 8' to 19' | Report; Scoreboard | Pen: Ernst Stapelberg 18', 37', 60' (3/5) | Referee: Jaco Pretorius |

Bye/s: CUT Ixias

=== Round two ===
| 6 February 2017 | UCT Ikey Tigers | 21–12 | CUT Ixias | UCT Rugby Fields, Cape Town |
| 16:45 | Try: Cuan Hablutzel 9'; Joel Smith 40'; Rico Lategan 80' (2BP); Con: Lohan Lubbe 40' (1/2); Robert Anderson 80' (1/1); Cards: Nama Xaba (yellow card) 24' to 36'; Jason Klaasen (red card) 27'; Joel Smith (yellow card) 57' to 67' | Report; Scoreboard | Try: Darren Adonis 59', 74'; Con: Martin Johannes Jacobs 75' (1/2) | Referee: Rodney Boneparte |

| 6 February 2017 | Maties | 26–14 | Wits | Danie Craven Stadium, Stellenbosch |
| 18:30 | Try: Craig Corbett 44'; Kyle Steyn 46' (2BP); Con: Ernst Stapelberg 46' (1/2); Pen: Ernst Stapelberg 5', 21', 63', 68' (4/4); Cards: Duncan Saal (yellow card) 78' | Report; Scoreboard | Try: Constant Beckerling 11'; Con: Warren Gilbert (0/1); Pen: Warren Gilbert 49', 55' (2/2); Drop: Warren Gilbert 53' (1/1); Cards: Kwanele Ngema (yellow card) 15' to 25' | Referee: Francois Pretorius |

| 6 February 2017 | UJ | 29–47 | UFS Shimlas | UJ Stadium, Johannesburg |
| 18:30 | Try: Godfrey Ramaboea 16'; Jo-Hanko de Villiers 47' penalty try 77'; Johan Esterhuizen 80'; Con: Divan Nel 47' (1/2); Ronald Brown 80' (1/1); Pen: Divan Nel 6' (1/1); Cards: Dillon Bakos (yellow card) 55' to 65' | Report; Scoreboard | Try: Neil Claassen 11' (2BP); Stephan Janse van Rensburg 20'; Daniel Maartens 49'; Phumzile Maqondwana 51' (2BP); Marco Mason 57'; Johan Kotze 65'; Con: Marco Mason 21', 50', 52', 58', 66' (5/6); Pen: Marco Mason 23' (1/1); Cards: Nardus Erasmus (yellow card) 40' to 50'; Thabiso Msiza (yellow card) 71'; Sango Xamlashe (yellow card) 75'; Ruben Schoeman (yellow card) 77' | Referee: Vusi Msibi |

| 6 February 2017 | NWU Pukke | 37–7 | NMMU Madibaz | Fanie du Toit Sport Ground, Potchefstroom |
| 19:00 | Try: Wilmar Arnoldi 15'; Elden Schoeman 18'; Jeandré Rudolph 70', 72'; Con: Schalk Hugo 16', 19', 71', 73' (4/4); Pen: Schalk Hugo 5', 46', 64' (3/3); Cards: Jimmy Mpailane (yellow card) 53' | Report; Scoreboard | Try: Xandré Vos 55'; Con: Simon Bolze 56' (1/1); Cards: Xandré Vos (yellow card) 34' | Referee: AJ Jacobs |

Bye/s: UP Tuks

=== Round three ===
| 13 February 2017 | Wits | 43–3 | CUT Ixias | Wits Rugby Stadium, Johannesburg |
| 16:45 | Try: Wandisile Simelane 4'; Graham Logan 39'; Justin Brandon 52'; Constant Beckerling 59'; Ameer Williams 82'; Con: Warren Gilbert 5', 39', 53', 83' (4/5); Pen: Warren Gilbert 22', 30' (2/2); Cards: Manuel Rass (yellow card) 61' to 71' | Report; Scoreboard | Pen: Martin Johannes Jacobs 18' (1/1); Cards: Dian Dry (yellow card) 25'; Stefan Jacobs (yellow card) 52' | Referee: Archie Sehlako |

| 13 February 2017 | UFS Shimlas | 7–22 | UCT Ikey Tigers | Shimla Park, Bloemfontein |
| 18:30 | Try: Marco Mason 62'; Con: Marco Mason 63' (1/1); Cards: Ruben Schoeman (yellow card) 9' to 20' | Report; Scoreboard | Try: Joel Smith 22'; Cuan Hablutzel 58'; Rayno Mapoe 69'; Con: Lohan Lubbe (0/3); Pen: Lohan Lubbe 63' (1/3); Cards: Cuan Hablutzel (yellow card) 62' | Referee: Lourens van der Merwe |

| 13 February 2017 | UP Tuks | 33–16 | NMMU Madibaz | LC de Villiers Stadium, Pretoria |
| 18:30 | Try: Impi Visser 12'; Theo Maree 15'; Tinus de Beer 40'; Manie Libbok 59', 71'; Con: Tinus de Beer 13', 16', 40' (3/4); Joshua Stander 72' (1/1); Cards: Theo Maree (yellow card) 23' to 33' | Report; Scoreboard | Try: Gerrit Huisamen 64'; Con: Simon Bolze 65' (1/1); Pen: Simon Bolze 7', 44', 53' (3/3); Cards: Andile Jho (yellow card) 33' to 43' | Referee: Jaco Pretorius |

| 13 February 2017 | Maties | 31–9 | NWU Pukke | Danie Craven Stadium, Stellenbosch |
| 19:00 | Try: Mitchell Carstens 5'; Kobus van Dyk 17'; Edwill van der Merwe 73'; Con: Ernst Stapelberg 6' (1/2); Chris Smith 74' (1/1); Pen: Ernst Stapelberg 13', 37', 46', 58' (4/4); Cards: Craig Corbett (yellow card) 50' to 60' | Report; Scoreboard | Try: Jimmy Mpailane 35'; Con: Schalk Hugo 36' (1/1); Pen: Schalk Hugo (0/1); Cards: Dean Stokes (yellow card) 62' to 72' | Referee: Rasta Rasivhenge |

Bye/s: UJ

=== Round four ===
| 20 February 2017 | Maties | 35–16 | NMMU Madibaz | Danie Craven Stadium, Stellenbosch |
| 18:30 | Try: Brendon Nell 22', 49'; Ian Groenewald 41'; Craig Barry 74'; Michal Haznar 77'; Con: Chris Smith 42', 49', 74', 77' (4/5) | Report; Scoreboard | Try: Wynand Grassmann 32'; SF Nieuwoudt 59'; Con: Tom Kean (0/2); Pen: Tom Kean 19', 39' (2/3); Cards: SF Nieuwoudt (yellow card) 69' to 79'; Brandon Brown (yellow card) 71' | Referee: Francois Pretorius |

| 20 February 2017 | NWU Pukke | 20–15 | UCT Ikey Tigers | Fanie du Toit Sport Ground, Potchefstroom |
| 18:30 | Try: Elden Schoeman 2'; Louis van der Westhuizen 53'; Con: Schalk Hugo 3', 54' (2/2); Pen: Schalk Hugo 7', 15' (2/2); Cards: Justin Newman (yellow card) 49' to 60' | Report; Scoreboard | Try: Gary Porter 80'; Con: Lohan Lubbe 80' (1/1); Pen: Robert Anderson 33', 50' (2/2) | Referee: Ricus van der Hoven |

| 20 February 2017 | UJ | 18–17 | UP Tuks | UJ Stadium, Johannesburg |
| 19:00 | Pen: Divan Nel 7', 40', 43', 51', 56', 66' (6/6); Drop: Divan Nel (0/1); Cards: Godfrey Ramaboea (yellow card) 13' to 24'; Len Massyn (yellow card) 25' to 36'; Wian Conradie (yellow card) 75' | Report; Scoreboard | Try: Denzel Hill 80'; Con: Joshua Stander (0/1); Pen: Tinus de Beer 20', 25', 53' (3/5); Joshua Stander 64' (1/1); Cards: Neethling Fouché (yellow card) 49' to 60' | Referee: Jaco Kotze |

| 21 February 2017 | CUT Ixias | 13 - 22 | UFS Shimlas | CUT Stadium, Bloemfontein |
| 16:45 |

Bye/s: Wits

=== Round five ===
| 27 February 2017 | UCT Ikey Tigers | 16 - 47 | Maties | UCT Rugby Fields, Cape Town |
| 16:45 |

| 27 February 2017 | UP Tuks | 25 - 9 | Wits | LC de Villiers Stadium, Pretoria |
| 18:30 |

| 27 February 2017 | CUT Ixias | 20 - 73 | UJ | CUT Stadium, Bloemfontein |
| 18:30 |

| 27 February 2017 | UFS Shimlas | 35 - 23 | NWU Pukke | Shimla Park, Bloemfontein |
| 19:00 |

Bye/s: NMMU Madibaz

=== Round six ===
| 6 March 2017 | UP Tuks | 100 - 0 | CUT Ixias | LC de Villiers Stadium, Pretoria |
| 16:45 |

| 6 March 2017 | NWU Pukke | 13 - 22 | Wits | Fanie du Toit Sport Ground, Potchefstroom |
| 18:30 |

| 6 March 2017 | NMMU Madibaz | 28 - 36 | UJ | UJ Stadium, Johannesburg |
| 18:30 |

| 6 March 2017 | UFS Shimlas | 12 - 60 | Maties | Shimla Park, Bloemfontein |
| 19:00 |

Bye/s: UCT Ikey Tigers

=== Round seven ===
| 13 March 2017 | UCT Ikey Tigers | 12 - 40 | UJ | UCT Rugby Fields, Cape Town |
| 16:45 |

| 13 March 2017 | UFS Shimlas | 19 - 65 | UP Tuks | Shimla Park, Bloemfontein |
| 18:30 |

| 13 March 2017 | CUT Ixias | 38 - 43 | NWU Pukke | CUT Stadium, Bloemfontein |
| 18:30 |

| 13 March 2017 | Wits | 30 - 20 | NMMU Madibaz | Wits Rugby Stadium, Johannesburg |
| 19:00 |

Bye/s: Maties

=== Round eight ===
| 20 March 2017 | UJ | 28 - 23 | Wits | UJ Stadium, Johannesburg |
| 16:45 |

| 20 March 2017 | UP Tuks | 51 - 23 | UCT Ikey Tigers | LC de Villiers Stadium, Pretoria |
| 18:30 |

| 20 March 2017 | CUT Ixias | 44 - 73 | Maties | CUT Stadium, Bloemfontein |
| 18:30 |

| 20 March 2017 | NMMU Madibaz | 7 - 23 | UFS Shimlas | Shimla Park, Bloemfontein |
| 19:00 |

Bye/s: NWU Pukke

=== Round nine ===
| 27 March 2017 | NWU Pukke | 28 - 43 | UP Tuks | Fanie du Toit Sport Ground, Potchefstroom |
| 16:45 |

| 27 March 2017 | NMMU Madibaz | 40 - 14 | CUT Ixias | CUT Stadium, Bloemfontein |
| 18:30 |

| 27 March 2017 | Wits | 35 - 23 | UCT Ikey Tigers | Wits Rugby Stadium, Johannesburg |
| 18:30 |

| 27 March 2017 | Maties | 65 - 19 | UJ | Danie Craven Stadium, Stellenbosch |
| 19:00 |

Bye/s: UFS Shimlas

== Play-offs ==
Semi-finals
3 April 2017
UP Tuks | 28
UFS Shimlas | 21
3 April 2017
Maties | 22
UJ | 14

Final
17 April 2017
UP Tuks | 28
Maties | 21

=== Semi-finals ===
3 April 2017
16:30

| UP Tuks | 28 - 21 | UFS Shimlas |

LC de Villiers Stadium, Pretoria

3 April 2017
19:00

| Maties | 22 - 14 | UJ |

Danie Craven Stadium, Stellenbosch

=== Final ===
17 April 2017
19:00

| UP Tuks | 28 -21 | Maties |
| Try: Chris Massyn 9'; Divan Rossouw 45'; Con: Tinus de Beer 10', 47'; Pen: Tinus de Beer 29', 40', 52', 66'; Cards: Jaco Holtzhausen (yellow card) 54' to 64' | | Try: Janco Venter 5'; Con: Chris Smith 7'; Pen: Chris Smith 12', 44', 55'; Tiaan Swanepoel 24'; Cards: Janco Venter (yellow card) 16' to 26' |

LC de Villiers Stadium, Pretoria
Referee: Jaco Pretorius

| Tuks | Maties |

| FB | 15 | Manie Libbok |
| RW | 14 | Dewald Naude |
| OC | 13 | Divan Rossouw |
| IC | 12 | Joshua Stander |
| LW | 11 | Sibahle Maxwane |
| FH | 10 | Tinus de Beer |
| SH | 9 | Andre Warner |
| N8 | 8 | Clyde Davids |
| OF | 7 | Chris Massyn (c) |
| BF | 6 | Marco van Staden |
| RL | 5 | Aston Fortuin |
| LL | 4 | Brian Leitch |
| TP | 3 | Neethling Fouche |
| HK | 2 | Corniel Els |
| LP | 1 | Andrew Beerwinkel |
Replacements:
| | 16 | Jan-Henning Campher |
| | 17 | Jaco Holtzhausen |
| | 18 | Marius Verwey |
| | 19 | Eduan Lubbe |
| | 20 | Theo Maree |
| | 21 | Toko Maebane |
| | 22 | Keanan van Wyk |
| | 23 | Franco van den Berg |
Coach:
Skollie Janse van Rensburg

| FB | 15 | Tiaan Swanepoel |
| RW | 14 | Kyle Steyn |
| OC | 13 | Michal Haznar |
| IC | 12 | Chris Smit |
| LW | 11 | Craig Barry (c) |
| FH | 10 | Chris Smith |
| SH | 9 | Brendon Nell |
| N8 | 8 | Devon Nash |
| OF | 7 | Kobus van Dyk |
| BF | 6 | Mitchell Carstens |
| RL | 5 | Janco Venter |
| LL | 4 | Ian Groenewald |
| TP | 3 | Niel Oelofse |
| HK | 2 | Craig Corbett |
| LP | 1 | Wesley Adonis |
Replacements:
| | 16 | HJ Luus |
| | 17 | Ricky Ngwabara |
| | 18 | Wikus Groenewald |
| | 19 | Johan Momsen |
| | 20 | Stephan Streicher |
| | 21 | Remu Malan |
| | 22 | Ernst Stapelberg |
| | 23 | Duncan Saal |
Coach:
Hawies Fourie

Player of the Match:
TBC UP Tuks

== Players ==
=== Squads ===
The following squads were named for the 2017 Varsity Cup:

2017 CUT Ixias squad
| Forwards | Dian Dry • Chrisjan du Toit • Kyle Ess • Stefan Jacobs • Stefan Kruger • Sylvester Makakole • Rayno Nel • Bester Olivier • Dean Adrian Rossouw • Kian Skippers • Henco Smit • Theunis Truter • Kabous van Schalkwyk • Pieter Venter • Brendan Verster • Jean Volkwyn • Did not play: • André Janse van Vuuren • Vincent Maruping • Andries Gerrit Otto • Burger van Niekerk |
| Backs | Darren Adonis • Denzil Fiff • Ruben Heymans • Dean Jacobs • Martin Johannes Jacobs • Denver Kleu • Tiisetso Madonsela • Johan Nel • Waldo Putter • Mosego Toolo • Clinton Toua • Ruan Wasserman • Did not play: • Heinrich Bitzi • Charl Francois Hugo • Ali Mgijima • Diederick Nicolaas Muller • Olwethu Ndakisa • Bjorn van Wyk |
| Coach | Tiaan Liebenberg |

2017 Maties squad
| Forwards | Saud Abrahams • Wesley Adonis • Jake Blew • Mitchell Carstens • Craig Corbett • Beyers de Villiers • Ian Groenewald • Wikus Groenewald • Christiaan Hamman • Freddie Kirsten • Hendrik Luus • Johan Momsen • Devon Nash • Niel Oelofse • Stephan Streicher • Jacobus van der Merwe • Kobus van Dyk • Johann van Niekerk • • Janco Venter • Did not play: • Iver Aanhuizen • Justin Benn |
| Backs | Craig Barry • Logan Boonzaaier • Paul de Wet • Michal Haznar • Brendon Nell • Duncan Saal • Chris Smit • Chris Smith • Ernst Stapelberg • Kyle Steyn • Tiaan Swanepoel • Edwill van der Merwe • Braam Venter • Did not play: • Remu Malan • Ryan Muller • Carlisle Nel • Adriaan van der Bank |
| Coach | Hawies Fourie |

2017 NMMU Madibaz squad
| Forwards | Ronnie Beyl • Brandon Brown • Wynand Grassmann • Jedwyn Harty • Justin Hollis • Gerrit Huisamen • Robert Izaks • JP Jamieson • Kevin Kaba • Mandisi Mthiyane • SF Nieuwoudt • NJ Oosthuizen • Jayson Reinecke • Nicolas Roebeck • Janse Roux • Daniel Voigt • Xandré Vos • Thembelihle Yase • Did not play: • Lusanda Badiyana |
| Backs | Simon Bolze • Luvo Claassen • Ivan-John du Preez • Andile Jho • Tom Kean • Jordan Koekemoer • Khaya Malotana • Athi Mayinje • Jixie Molapo • Sphu Msutwana • Rouche Nel • Luan Nieuwoudt • Lindelwe Zungu • Did not play: • Michael Brink • Riaan Esterhuizen • Dundré Maritz • Sibusiso Ngcokovane |
| Coach | David Maidza |

2016 NWU-Pukke squad
| Forwards | Wilmar Arnoldi • Dewald Dekker • Marcel Henn • Muziwandile Mazibuko • Loftus Morrison • Kabelo Motloung • Marno Redelinghuys • Jeandré Rudolph • Walt Steenkamp • Morné Strydom • Jaco Swanepoel • Louis van der Westhuizen • Dane van der Westhuyzen • Nico van Tonder • Dolf van Deventer • Boela Venter • Estehan Visagie • Did not play: • Ruan Venter |
| Backs | Lungelo Gosa • Schalk Hugo • Caleb Louw • Tapiwa Mafura • Henko Marais • Nkululeko Mcuma • Jimmy Mpailane • Justin Newman • Jaap Pienaar • Elden Schoeman • Chriswill September • Dean Stokes • Did not play: • Julian Delicado • Akhona Nela • Ryno Wepener |
| Coach | Jonathan Mokuena |

2017 UCT Ikey Tigers squad
| Forwards | Martin Chandler • William Day • Cuan Hablutzel • Jason Klaasen • Michael Kumbirai • Wayrin Losper • Sanele Malwane • Lee-Marvin Mazibuko • Gary Porter • Duncan Saffy • Alva Senderayi • Luke Stringer • Nyasha Tarusenga • Nama Xaba • Msizi Zondi • Did not play: • Joel Carew • Jayson Landman • Matt Wiseman |
| Backs | Ibrahim Adams • Robert Anderson • Suwi Chibale • Hilio de Abreu • Stefano de Gouveia • Liam Furniss • Rico Lategan • Lohan Lubbe • Jez Macintyre • Rayno Mapoe • Tristan Mouton • Gerard Pieterse • Matthew Redman • Sebastian Roodt • Joel Smith • Did not play: • Michael Henning • Justin Heunis • Bradley Janse van Rensburg • Nate Nel |
| Coach | Christiaan Esterhuizen |

2017 UFS Shimlas squad
| Forwards | Anrich Alberts • Kwenzo Blose • Neil Claassen • Nardus Erasmus • Nicolaas Immelman • Johan Kotze • Ruan Kramer • Daniel Maartens • Phumzile Maqondwana • Musa Mahlasela • Thabiso Msiza • Hanno Snyman • Ruben Schoeman • Francois Steyn • Raymond Woest • Did not play: • Ewan Coetzee • Bertie de Bod • Benjamin Jansen van Vuuren • Willandré Kotzenberg • Boan Venter |
| Backs | Dian Badenhorst • Carel-Jan Coetzee • Stephan Janse van Rensburg • Vuyani Maqina • Marco Mason • Sechaba Matsoele • Nakkie Naudé • Armand Pretorius • Niell Stannard • Sango Xamlashe • Lihleli Xoli • Did not play: • Ruan Henning • Rewan Kruger • Naldo Meyer • Jan Lourens Schreuder • Christiaan Schutte • Dawid Snyman |
| Coach | Hendro Scholtz |

2017 UJ squad
| Forwards | Dillon Bakos • Driaan Bester • Wian Conradie • Jo-Hanko de Villiers • Nico du Plessis • Kevin du Randt • Estian Enslin • Chergin Fillies • Kanya Gela • Kyle Kruger • Len Massyn • Emmanuel Morowane • Reinhard Nothnagel • Jannes Snyman • Kyle van Dalen • Waldo Weideman • Did not play: • Le Roux Baard • Roelof Diedericks • Siyabonga Luwaca • Juandré Michau • FP Pelser • Sarel Smith • James Venter |
| Backs | Ewan Adams • Ronald Brown • Aphiwe Dyantyi • Johan Esterhuizen • Jaco Fourie • Dominic Kroezen • Devon Maré • Divan Nel • Godfrey Ramaboea • PJ Walters • Did not play: • Jamie Campbell • Tyreeq February • Hilton Mudariki • Cyprian Nkomo • Barend Smit • Tshepo Thulo • Boeta Vermaak |
| Unknown | Did not play: • Carlisle Jordan |
| Coach | Skollie Janse van Rensburg |

2017 UP Tuks squad
| Forwards | Andrew Beerwinkel • Jan-Henning Campher • Mervano da Silva • Clyde Davids • Aston Fortuin • Neethling Fouché • Denzel Hill • Jaco Holtzhausen • Brian Leitch • Eduan Lubbe • Chris Massyn • Theunis Reynolds • Eli Snyman • Ruan Steenkamp • Jsuan-re Swanepoel • O'Neil Thiart • Franco van den Berg • Marco van Staden • Marius Verwey • Did not play: • Jan van der Merwe |
| Backs | Tinus de Beer • Manie Libbok • Adrian Maebane • Theo Maree • Rabz Maxwane • Dewald Naudé • Raegan Oranje • Divan Rossouw • Joshua Stander • Keanan van Wyk • Impi Visser • Did not play: • Heino Bezuidenhout • Earll Douwrie • Boeta Hamman • Kefentse Mahlo • Embrose Papier • Marais Schmidt • Louwtjie Steenkamp • Kurt Webster |
| Coach | Pote Human |

2017 Wits squad
| Forwards | Constant Beckerling • Justin Brandon • Conor Brockschmidt • CJ Conradie • Jethi de Lange • CJ Greeff • Rhyno Herbst • Graham Logan • Ruan Macdonald • Brandon Palmer • Luvuyo Pupuma • Mike Renwick • Pascal Snyman • Ameer Williams • Chris Worthington • Did not play: • Craig Hume • Ayabulela Mdudi • Luyolo Qinela • Tijde Visser |
| Backs | Jarred Branco • Ruan Cloete • Kallie Erasmus • Warren Gilbert • Brandan Hewitt • Josh Jarvis • Themba Mpemvu • Kwanele Ngema • Luxolo Ntsepe • Manuel Rass • Wandisile Simelane • AJ van Blerk • Did not play: • Wian Coetzee • Manqoba Mbatha • Lwazi Monakali • Wolta Mtsweni • Christopher Schimper |
| Coach | Hugo van As |

== See also ==
- Varsity Cup
- 2017 Varsity Rugby
- 2017 Varsity Shield
- 2017 Gold Cup
