= Jesse Johnson =

Jesse Johnson may refer to:

- Jesse Johnson (actor) (born 1982), American actor
- Jesse Johnson (American football) (born 1957), American professional football player (New York Jets)
- Jesse Johnson (keyboardist) (born 1977), American keyboardist of Motion City Soundtrack
- Jesse Johnson (musician) (born 1960), American lead guitarist of The Time
- Jesse Johnson (New York lawyer) (1842–1918), U.S. Attorney and Associate Justice of the New York Supreme Court
- Jesse Johnson (Washington politician) (born 1989/90), Washington state representative
- Jesse Johnson (West Virginia politician) (born 1959), activist and perennial candidate
- Jesse Johnson Yeates (1829–1892), U.S. Representative from North Carolina
- Jesse V. Johnson (born 1971), English stunt coordinator and filmmaker
