= Jean-Pierre Smith =

Jean-Pierre Smith may refer to:

- JP Smith (rugby union, born 1990), a South African/Australian rugby union player.
- Jean-Pierre Smith (politician), Cape Town city councillor.
