= Schalk Hugo =

South African rugby union player

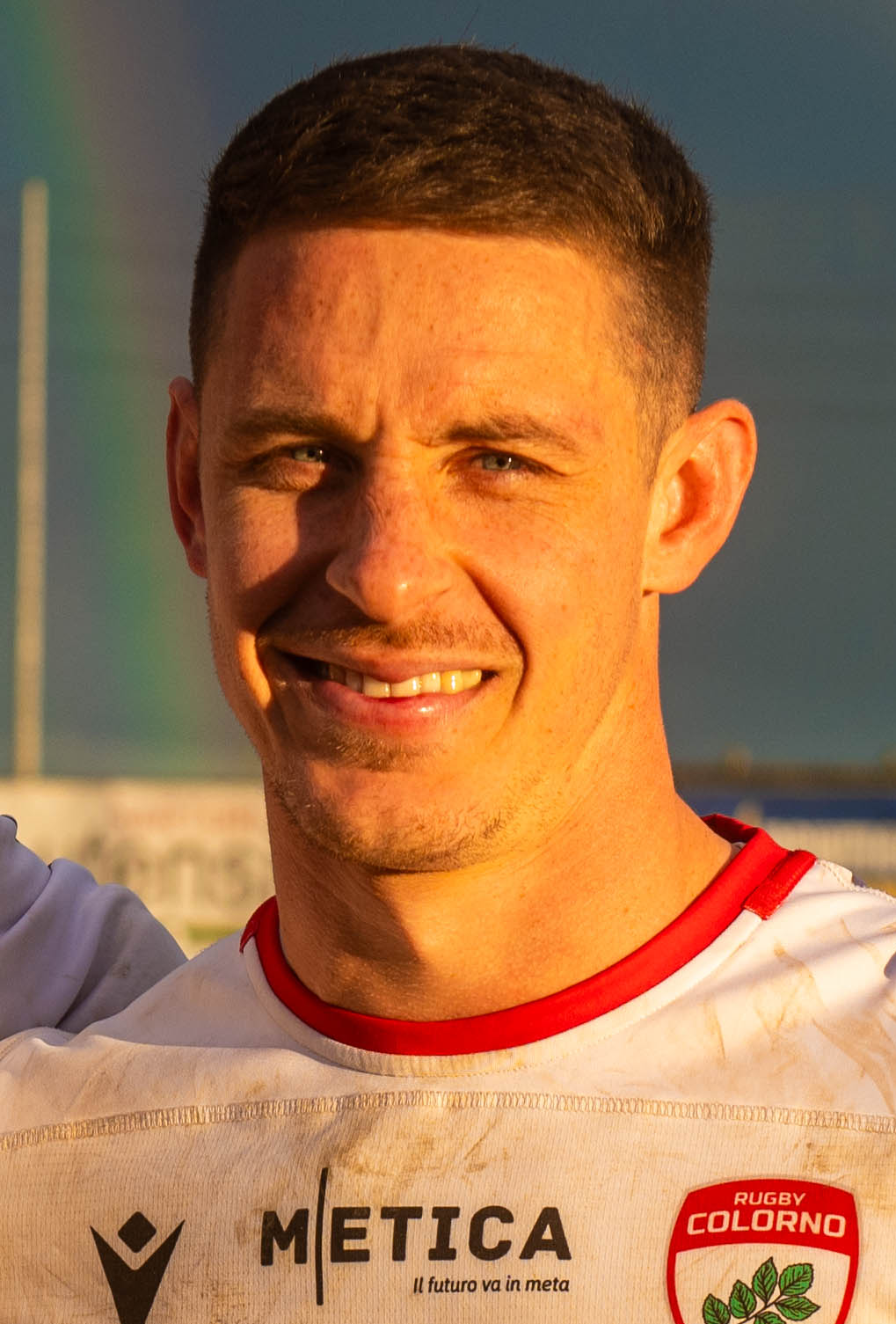
- Hugo in 2023
- Born: 12 January 1995 (age 31) South Africa
- Height: 1.80 m (5 ft 11 in)
- Weight: 83 kg (183 lb; 13 st 1 lb)
- School: Worcester Gymnasium

Rugby union career
- Position: Fly-Half
- Current team: Colorno
Youth career
- NWU Pukke
Amateur team(s)
Years	Team	Apps	(Points)
2017−2019	NWU Pukke		
Senior career
Years	Team	Apps	(Points)
2014−2019	Leopards	43	(325)
2019−2020	Vannes	4	(12)
2020−2023	Calvisano	54	(532)
2023−	Colorno		
- Correct as of 19 October 2020
- Correct as of 19 October 2020

Schalk Hugo (born 17 August 1994) is a South African rugby union player. His usual position is as a Fly-Half and he currently plays for Colorno in Italian Serie A Elite.

From 2015 to 2018 he played with Leopards in Currie Cup. He played for Calvisano in Italian Top12 from 2020 until 2022−23 season.
