= 2019 Varsity Shield =

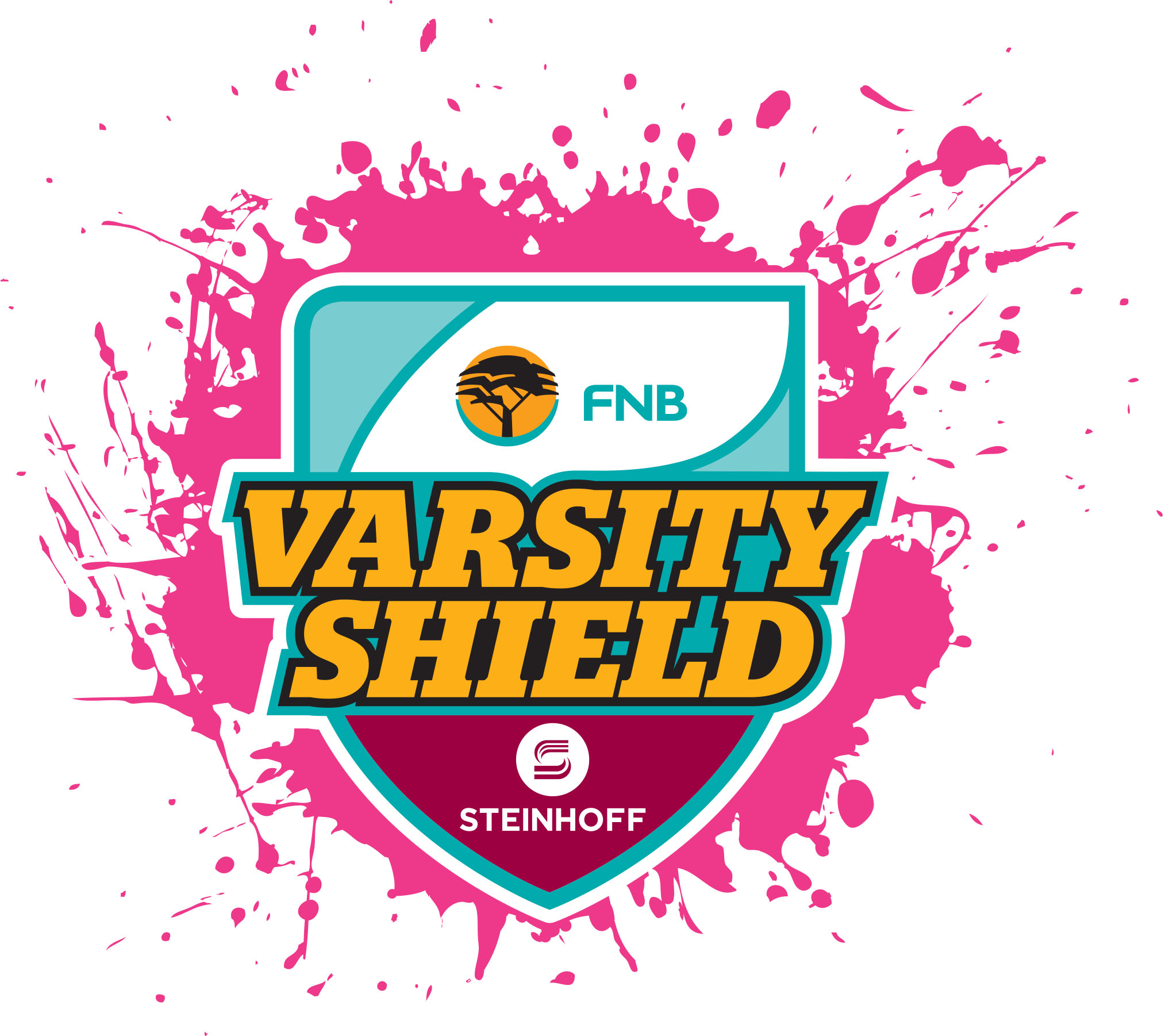
- Countries: South Africa
- Date: 18 February – 11 April 2019
- Champions: CPUT
- Runners-up: NMU Madibaz
- Relegated: n/a
- Matches played: 45
- Top point scorer: Ralton October (96)
- Top try scorer: Sango Xamlashe (7)

The 2019 Varsity Shield was the 9th season of the Varsity Shield, the second-tier competition in the annual Varsity Rugby series. It was played between 18 February and 11 April 2019 and featured seven university teams.

There was a debut in the competition for NMU Madibaz, who were relegated from the Varsity Cup in 2018.

== Competition rules and information ==
There were seven participating university teams in the 2019 Varsity Shield. They played each other once during the pool stage, either at home or away. Teams received four points for a win and two points for a draw. Bonus points were awarded to teams that scored four or more tries in a game, as well as to teams that lost a match by seven points or less. Teams were ranked by log points, then points difference (points scored less points conceded).

The top four teams after the pool stage qualified for the semifinals, which were followed by a final. 2019 is a non-relegation year.

== Teams ==
Location of teams in the 2019 Varsity Shield

The teams that played in the 2019 Varsity Cup are:

2019 Varsity Cup teams
Team name	University	Stadium
CPUT	Cape Peninsula University of Technology	CPUT Sports Stadium, Cape Town
NMU Madibaz	Nelson Mandela University	NMU Stadium, Port Elizabeth
Rhodes	Rhodes University	Rhodes Great Field, Grahamstown
TUT Vikings	Tshwane University of Technology	TUT Stadium, Pretoria
UFH Blues	University of Fort Hare	Davidson Rugby Field, Alice
UKZN Impi	University of KwaZulu-Natal	Peter Booysen Sports Park, Pietermaritzburg
WSU All Blacks	Walter Sisulu University	Buffalo City Stadium, East London

== Pool stage ==
=== Standings ===
The final log for the 2019 Varsity Shield was:

2019 Varsity Shield log
Pos	Team	P	W	D	L	PD	Pts
1	NMU Madibaz	6	6	0	0	200	30
2	CPUT	6	5	0	1	105	25
3	WSU All Blacks	6	3	0	3	31	18
4	UKZN Impi	6	3	0	3	22	16
5	UFH Blues	6	2	0	4	−22	9
6	TUT Vikings	6	1	0	5	-176	5
7	Rhodes	6	1	0	5	-160	4
Correct as at 20 February 2019.

Legend and competition rules
Legend:
Qualified for the semifinals.	P = Games played, W = Games won, D = Games drawn, L = Games lost, PF = Points for, PA = Points against, PD = Points difference, TF = Tries for, TA = Tries against, TB = Try bonus points, LB = Losing bonus points, Pts = Log points
Competition rules:
Qualification: The top four teams qualified for the semifinals. Points breakdown: * 4 points for a win * 2 points for a draw * 1 bonus point for a loss by seven points or less * 1 bonus point for scoring four or more tries in a match

=== Matches ===
The following matches were played in the 2019 Varsity Shield:

==== Round one ====
18 February 2019	NMU Madibaz	38–21	CPUT	NMU Stadium, Port Elizabeth
18:30		Having been relegated from the Varsity cup, NMU started the game as a team that had something to prove. They played hard and were the evetualy winners.

18 February 2019	UFH Blues	22–36	WSU All Blacks	Davidson Rugby Field, Alice
18:30

18 February 2019	UKZN Impi	50–10	Rhodes	Howard College Rugby Stadium, Durban
18:30

Bye/s: TUT Vikings

==== Round two ====
21 February 2019	Rhodes	13–12	UFH Blues	Rhodes Great Field, Grahamstown
16:45

21 February 2019	CPUT	57–28	TUT Vikings	CPUT Sports Stadium, Cape Town
18:30		CPUT and TUT looked evenly matched throughout the game. In the first half it looked as though the game could go either way. However in the second half, CPUT came out strong and dominated to eventually secure the game.

21 February 2019	WSU All Blacks	3–32	NMU Madibaz	Buffalo City Stadium, East London
19:00

Bye/s: UKZN Impi

==== Round three ====
25 February 2019	NMU Madibaz	53–8	Rhodes	NMU Stadium, Port Elizabeth
18:30

25 February 2019	WSU All Blacks	22–28	CPUT	Buffalo City Stadium, East London
18:30

25 February 2019	TUT Vikings	7–52	UKZN Impi	TUT Stadium, Pretoria
18:30		Playing away from their TUT stadium the game promised much. TUT cam out firing but the UKZN players absorbed the pressure and eventually came back to thoroughly dominate the game in all aspects.

Bye/s: UFH Blues

==== Round four ====
4 March 2019	UKZN Impi	12–41	NMU Madibaz	Peter Booysen Sports Park, Pietermaritzburg
18:30

4 March 2019	Rhodes	6–32	WSU All Blacks	Rhodes Great Field, Grahamstown
18:30

4 March 2019	UFH Blues	33–7	TUT Vikings	Davidson Rugby Field, Alice
18:30	Try: Brandt Fields, Sokhana Mpemba (2), Rocur Julies, Mihlali Nobomvu, Lukho Jongizulu; Con: Rocur Julies (2), Brandt Fields (2)	Tut was soundly beaten in the forward battle. Many a scrum went backwards by the might of the UFH scrum. TUT will need to up their game to regain pride this season.	Try: Laro Delport; Con: Mauritz Maritz

Bye/s: CPUT

==== Round five ====
11 March 2019	WSU All Blacks	27–28	UKZN Impi	Buffalo City Stadium, East London
18:30

11 March 2019	TUT Vikings	25 –17	Rhodes	TUT Stadium, Pretoria
18:30		TUT's first win of the season. Playing for pride the bottom feeders played a tough game.In an evenly matched game, the eventual winners were TUT

11 March 2019	CPUT	41–25	UFH Blues	CPUT Sports Stadium, Cape Town
18:30

Bye/s: NMU Madibaz

==== Round six ====
18 March 2019	NMU Madibaz	62–5	TUT Vikings	NMU Stadium, Port Elizabeth
18:30		Can any team stop NMU? certainly not TUT who were completely dominated in all aspects. Big loss for TUT

18 March 2019	UKZN Impi	18–24	UFH Blues	Howard College Rugby Stadium, Durban
18:30

18 March 2019	Rhodes	10–52	CPUT	Rhodes Great Field, Grahamstown
18:30

Bye/s: WSU All Blacks

==== Round seven ====
25 March 2019	UFH Blues	9–32	NMU Madibaz	Davidson Rugby Field, Alice
18:30

25 March 2019	TUT Vikings	13–40	WSU All Blacks	TUT Stadium, Pretoria
18:30		This game started off as an evenly matched affair. Till the second half where WSU came back to thrash TUT. New blood is needed in TUT.

25 March 2019	CPUT	69–40	UKZN Impi	CPUT Sports Stadium, Cape Town
18:30

Bye/s: Rhodes

== Play-offs ==
=== Semifinals ===
4 April 2019	FNB CPUT	40–8	FNB WSU	CPUT Sports Stadium, Cape Town

4 April 2019	FNB Madibaz	46–0	FNB UKZN	NMU Stadium, Port Elizabeth

=== Final ===
11 April 2019	FNB Madibaz	28–32	FNB CPUT	NMU Stadium, Port Elizabeth
18:15
