= 2017 Gold Cup (rugby union) =

- Countries: South Africa, Namibia and Zimbabwe
- Date: 9 September – 29 October 2017

The 2017 Gold Cup was the second season of the Gold Cup rugby competition since its name change, having previously been known as the Community Cup. The competition was the top competition for non-university rugby union clubs in South Africa, Namibia and Zimbabwe.

The 2017 competition retained the same timeslot as the 2016 edition, taking place between 9 September and 29 October 2017.

== Competition rules and information ==
The format of the Gold Cup was the same as the Rugby World Cup. The teams were divided into four pools, each containing five teams. Each team played four pool games, facing all the other teams in their pools once, with two of those matches being home games and two being away games.

The winner and runner-up of each pool entered the play-off stage, which consisted of quarter finals, semi-finals and the final. The winner of each pool met the runner-up of a different pool in a quarter final, at the home venue of the pool winner. The winner of each quarter-final progressed to the semi-finals and the semi-final winners to the final, which was held at the home venue of the finalist with the best record in the pool stages.

== Qualification ==
Defending champions Rustenburg Impala qualified for the 2017 Gold Cup competition. They will be joined by the highest-placed non-university clubs from the club leagues of South Africa's fourteen provincial unions, Limpopo, Namibia and Zimbabwe, plus two wildcard spots.

== Teams ==
The following teams qualified for the 2017 Gold Cup:

Location of teams in the 2017 Gold Cup
South Africa
2017 Gold Cup (rugby union) is located in South Africa
Gauteng	Western Cape
2017 Gold Cup (rugby union) is located in Gauteng	2017 Gold Cup (rugby union) is located in Western Cape
Namibia	Zimbabwe
2017 Gold Cup (rugby union) is located in Namibia	2017 Gold Cup (rugby union) is located in Zimbabwe
Teams in Pool A, Pool B, Pool C and Pool D

=== Team Listing ===
Team	Sponsored Name	Union	Pool
Bloemfontein Police	Recall Security Bloemfontein Police	Free State	Pool A
College Rovers	Go Nutz College Rovers	KwaZulu-Natal	Pool D
False Bay	DirectAxis False Bay	Western Province	Pool D
Northam Rhinos	Northam Platinum Rhinos	Limpopo Blue Bulls	Pool B
Old Georgians	Old Georgians	Zimbabwe	Pool B
Old Selbornians	Mike Pendock Motors Old Selbornians	Border	Pool C
Progress (George)	Progress (George)	SWD	Pool C
Progress (Uitenhage)	Progress (Uitenhage)	Eastern Province	Pool C
QBR	QBR	Blue Bulls	Pool B
Raiders	Raiders	Golden Lions	Pool B
Roses United	Roses United	Boland	Pool D
Rustenburg Impala	Newrak Rustenburg Impala	Leopards	Pool A
Sasol	Sasol Hydra-ARC Rugby	Mpumalanga	Pool A
Sishen	IMT Sishen	Griquas	Pool D
Swallows	Swallows	Border	Pool C
Tygerberg	Tygerberg	Western Province	Pool C
Vaal Reefs	Speedy Car Sales Vaal Reefs	Leopards	Pool B
Vereeniging	Weziswe Security Vereeniging	Valke	Pool A
Welkom	Human Auto Welkom	Griffons	Pool A
Western Suburbs	FNB Western Suburbs	Namibia	Pool D
