= Cape Peninsula University of Technology =

University in Cape Town, South Africa

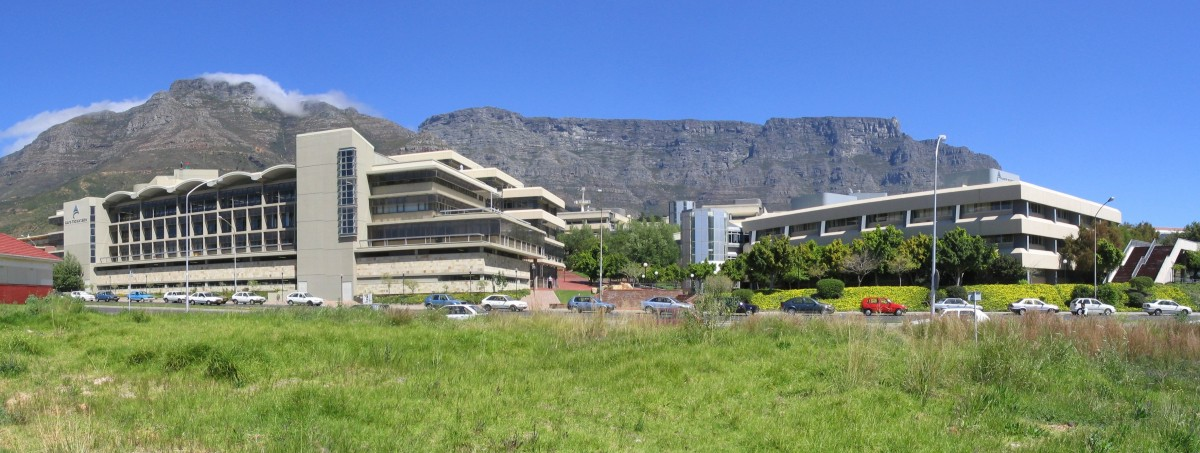
- CPUT's District Six campus, with Table Mountain in the background
- Other names: CPUT
- Motto: Creating Futures
- Type: Public
- Established: January 2005, 1; 21 years ago
- Academic affiliations: AAU; CHEC; HESA
- Chancellor: Brian Fiogaji
- Vice-Chancellor: Chris Nhlapo
- Students: 35,000+ (2026)
- Location: Cape Town, Western Cape, South Africa
- Campus: Five campuses
- Colours: Blue and White
- Website: cput.ac.za

Cape Peninsula University of Technology (Afrikaans: Kaapse Skiereiland Universiteit van Tegnologie), commonly referred to simply as CPUT, is a university of technology based in Cape Town, South Africa.

It is the only university of technology in the Western Cape province, and is also the largest university in the province by student population, with over 35,000 enrolled as of 2026. The institution was established in 2005, through the merging of the Cape Technikon, Peninsula Technikon, and a few other independent colleges.

== History ==
CPUT was established on 1 January 2005, through the merging of the Cape Technikon and Peninsula Technikon, as well as numerous small colleges, following years of change in the higher education landscape of South Africa.

In 1993, the Technikons Act was promulgated, which allowed technikons to offer bachelor's degrees (B.Tech), master's and doctoral degrees in Technology.

In March 2001, then-Minister of Higher Education Kader Asmal announced the National Plan on Higher Education. In May 2002, he announced the possible merger of the two institutions, with the National Working Committee also recommending the University of the Western Cape be included in the merger.

Towards the end of 2002, the final merger was announced, and in October 2003, the institution's new name was approved. An Executive Interim Management body was appointed towards the end of 2004.

Prof. L Vuyisa Mazwi-Tanga was appointed as the first vice-chancellor of CPUT in February 2006. Around the same time, the nine faculties of the original institutions were merged and re-organized into six new ones. These were Applied Science; Business; Education and Social Sciences; Engineering; Health and Wellness Sciences; and Informatics & Design.

A separate postgraduate unit was established to offer multidisciplinary postgraduate programmes and funded research known as the e-Innovation Academy, and as from March 2008 the Faculty of Informatics & Design Research Unit.

The Department of Information Technology in collaboration with the Bridgetown Community, Athlone, COFISA and IDM launched the Athlone Living lab, a community ICT innovation project, in September 2008. This would be the first Living Lab in the Western Cape.

Logo of Cape Technikon, used for the independent institution, before CPUT was established through a merger in 2005

In April 2008, then-South African Minister of Finance Trevor Manuel was appointed Chancellor of CPUT.

== Campuses ==
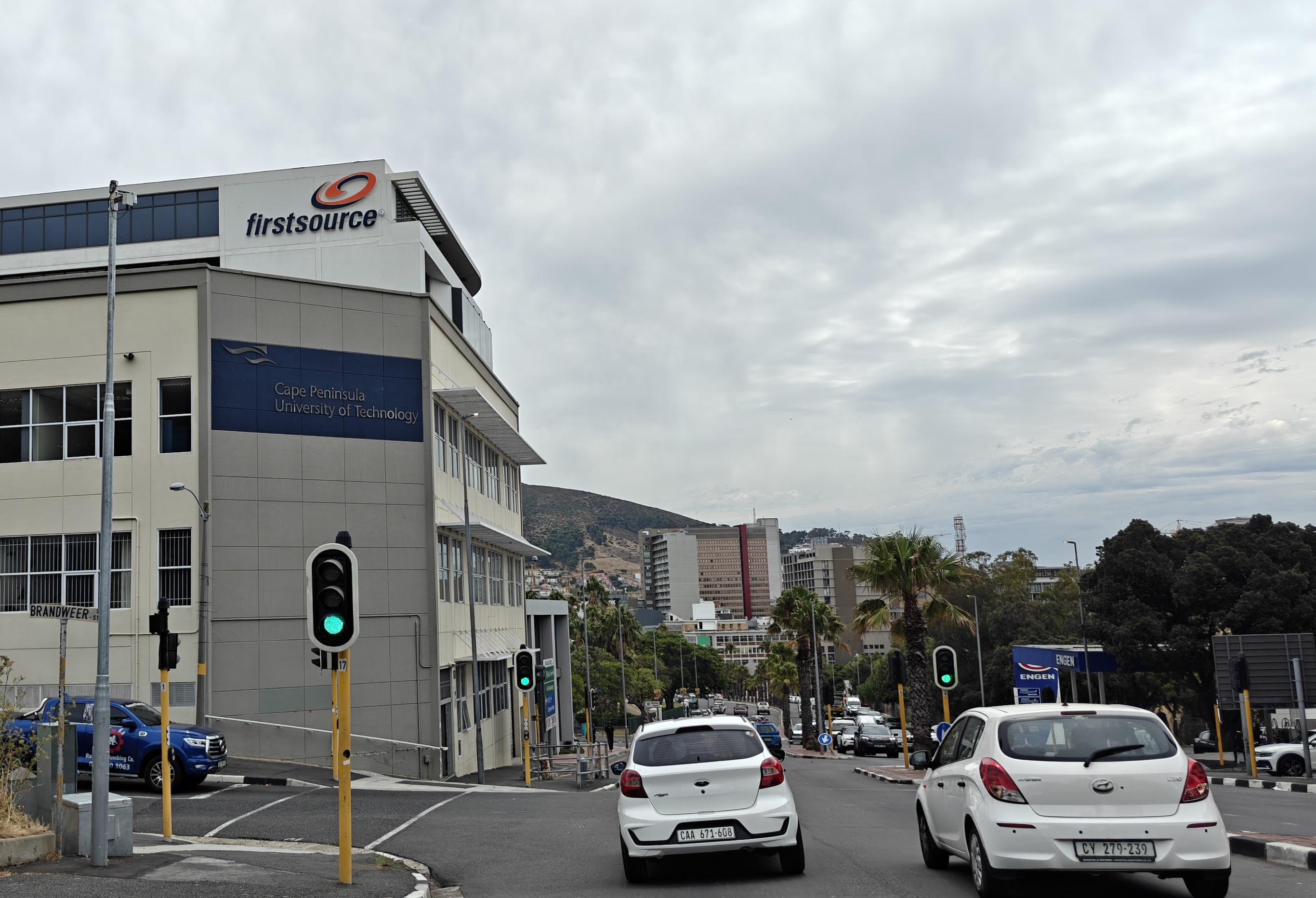
CPUT's Roeland Street satellite campus (left), which serves as the administration and research hub of the Faculty of Informatics & Design

CPUT has five main campuses:

- The Bellville Campus, formerly the campus of the Peninsula Technikon (33°55′56″S 18°38′25″E)
- The District Six Campus, formerly the campus of the Cape Technikon (33°55′52″S 18°25′49″E)
- The Mowbray Campus, formerly the Mowbray College of Education (33°56′47″S 18°28′18″E)
- The Granger Bay Campus, housing the Cape Town Hotel School and the Survival Centre (33°53′58″S 18°24′41″E)
- The Wellington Campus, formerly the Boland College of Education (33°38′12″S 19°0′36″E)

== Cooperative education ==
The large majority of courses offered by CPUT incorporate in-service training, consisting of an internship of usually six months to a year.

The university's comprehensive co-operative education policy ensures the student is placed within a company approved by the university; this ensures that institutional academic learning is incorporated into work-based content.

== Notable people ==
- Zozibini Tunzi – actress, model and Miss Universe 2019
- [Seth Rotherham – entrepreneur and media personality
- Gillian Abel – public health researcher
- Tariro Mnangagwa – film producer, actress and conservationist
- Justin Bonello – television personality, producer, and writer.
- Alvin Botes – African National Congress (ANC) politician
- Trevor Manuel – retired politician and former anti-apartheid activist
- Celeste Matthews Wannenburgh – actress, playwright

== List of Chancellors ==
Below is a list of individuals who have served in the role of Chancellor of CPUT.

- Prof. Brian Figaji (December 2025 - present)

== See also ==
- Education in South Africa
- List of universities in South Africa
- Open access in South Africa
- List of South African open access repositories
