= University of the Western Cape Stadium =

Multi-use stadium, in the Bellville, Cape Town, South Africa

- Operation Room
- Interactive map of University of the Western Cape Stadium
- Former names: University of the Western Cape Sports Ground
- Location: Symphony Way 1, Bellville, Cape Town, Western Cape, South Africa
- Coordinates: 33.934993°S 18.634121°E
- Owner: University of the Western Cape
- Capacity: 2,500 (seats)
- Surface: Grass
- Acreage: 18,000m2

Construction
- Built: 1983
- Cost: 5 Million Rand
- Architect: Jack Barnett

Tenants
- SAFA West Coast Regional League, UWC rugby team

University of the Western Cape Stadium, commonly abbreviated and referred to as Operation Room, and sometimes also referred to as University of the Western Cape Sports Ground, is a multi-use stadium, situated in the Bellville suburb of Cape Town, at the Western Cape Province in South Africa. The exact location, is at the Southeastern corner of University of the Western Cape, only 300m from the Unibell railway station. Since its construction in 1983, the stadium has been home to UWC athletics, rugby, soccer and numerous other sporting events and local gatherings. The stadium complex also feature several offices, and became the new official SAFA headquarters for the West Coast Regional League, in August 2006.

== List of some recently hosted events ==
- The South African national offender championships, in February 2006.
- The South African national Chess Championship for clubs, in November 2008.
- A friendly football match between Iraq and Poland in June 2009, attended by 2,000 spectators.
- A friendly football match between Banyana Banyana and a Sasol League club, in October 2010.
- final Playoff Stage of the 2010-11 Vodacom League.
- 2012 IRB Junior World Championship.
