= 2026 Varsity Shield =

South African University Rugby Competition

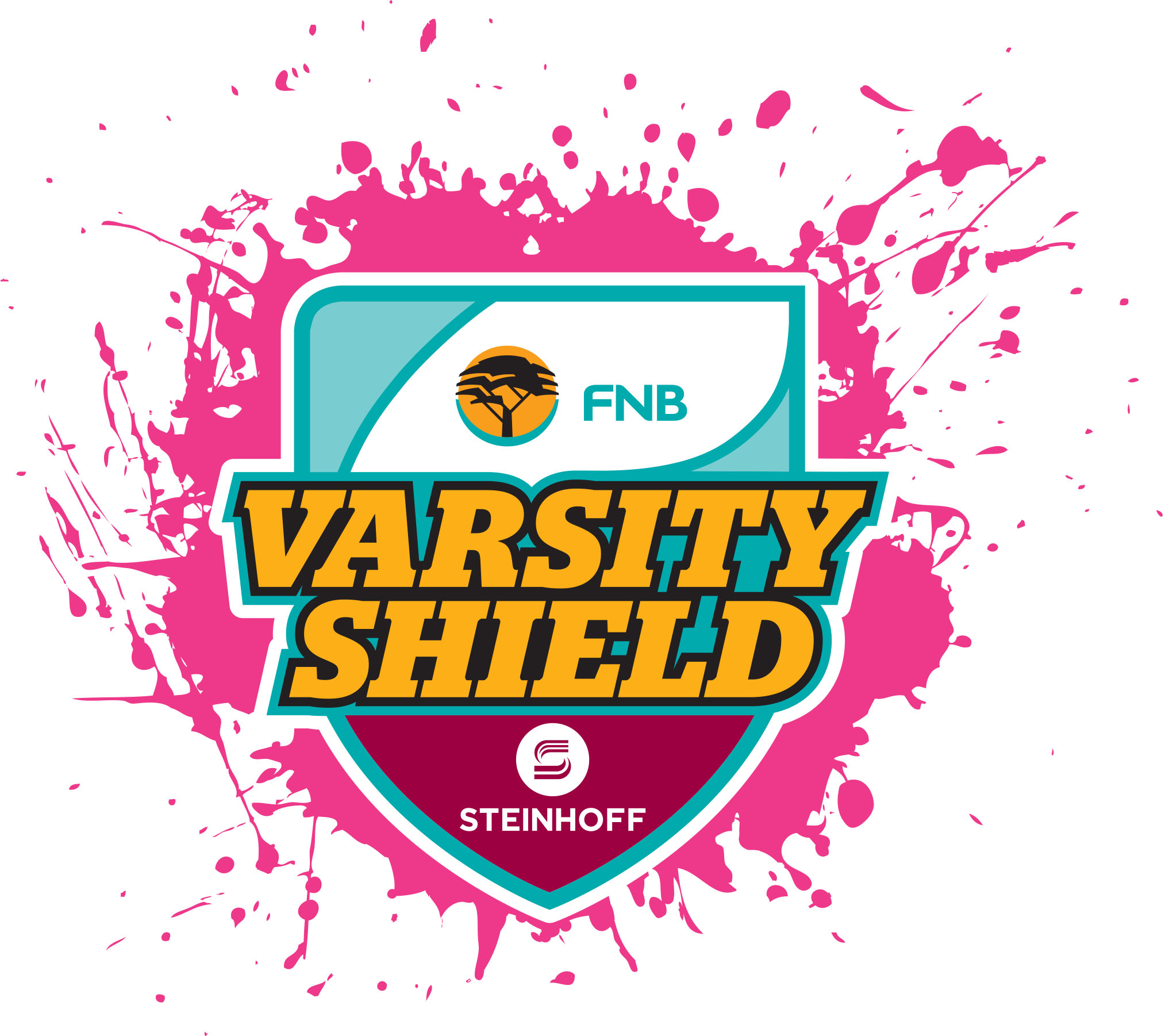
- Wits crowned 2026 Varsity Shield champions
- Countries: South Africa
- Date: 13 February – 10 April 2026
- Champions: Wits (3rd title)
- Runners-up: WSU All Blacks
- Promoted: Wits (Varsity Cup)
- Relegated: FNB SBU
- Matches played: 56
- Tries scored: 303 (average 5.4 per match)
- Top point scorer: Rekkie Gerber (46); Wits
- Top try scorer: Mangaliso Zixesha (19); WSU All Blacks

The 2026 Varsity Shield was the 16th season of the Varsity Shield, the second-tier competition in the annual Varsity Rugby series. The tournament was played between 13 February and 10 April 2026 and featured eight university teams.

Wits were relegated from the Varsity Cup in 2025, but were promoted back into the 2027 Varsity Cup after topping the pool in this edition of the Varsity Shield. Emeris were promoted to the 2026 varsity Cup shortly after making their debut only a year prior to that, whilst CUT Ixias have been relegated from the 2026 Varsity Cup and will compete in the 2027 Varsity Shield.

== Competition rules and information ==
There were eight participating university teams in the 2026 Varsity Shield. Each team played each other once during the pool stage, either at home or away. Teams received four points for a win and two points for a draw. Bonus points were awarded to teams that scored four or more tries in a game, as well as to teams that lost a match by seven points or less. Teams were ranked by log points, then points difference (points scored less points conceded).

The top four teams after the pool stage qualified for the semifinals, which were followed by a final.

== Teams ==
Location of teams in the 2025 Varsity Shield

The teams that played in the 2026 Varsity Shield were:

2026 Varsity Shield teams
Team name	University	Stadium
CPUT	Cape Peninsula University of Technology	CPUT Sports Stadium, Cape Town
NMU Madibaz	Nelson Mandela University	NMU Stadium, Port Elizabeth
UFH Blues	University of Fort Hare	Davidson Rugby Field, Alice
UKZN Impi	University of KwaZulu-Natal	Peter Booysen Sports Park, Pietermaritzburg
WSU All Blacks	Walter Sisulu University	Buffalo City Stadium, East London
UWC	Western Cape University	University of the Western Cape Stadium
Wits	University of the Witwatersrand	Wits Rugby Stadium
FNB SBU	Sol Plaatje University	Griqua Park, Kimberley

== Standings ==
=== 2026 Varsity Shield Log ===
The final log for the 2026 Varsity Shield was:

2026 Varsity Shield Log
Pos	Team	P	W	D	L	PD	TS	BP	PTS
1	Wits	7	6	1	0	315	68	7	32
2	WSU All Blacks	7	5	1	1	58	37	6	28
3	UWC	7	5	0	2	32	35	5	25
4	NMU Madibaz	7	4	0	3	29	43	7	23
5	UKZN Impi	7	3	0	4	-34	32	7	19
6	CPUT	7	2	0	5	−70	37	7	15
7	UFH Blues	7	2	0	5	−81	25	3	11
8	FNB SBU	7	0	0	7	-249	26	4	4
Correct as at 30 March 2026 (Round 7).

Legend and competition rules
Legend:
Qualify for the semifinals.	P = Games played, W = Games won, D = Games drawn, L = Games lost, PF = Points for, PA = Points against, PD = Points difference, TF = Tries for, TA = Tries against, TB = Try bonus points, LB = Losing bonus points, Pts = Log points
Competition rules:
Qualification: The top four teams qualify for the semifinals. Points breakdown: * 4 points for a win * 2 points for a draw * 1 bonus point for a loss by seven points or less * 1 bonus point for scoring four or more tries in a match

=== Round-by-round ===
Team Progression – 2026 Varsity Shield
Team	R1	R2	R3	R4	R5	R6	R7	Semi	Final
Wits	3 (4th)	8 (2nd)	13 (1st)	18 (1st)	23 (1st)	28 (1st)	32 (1st)	Won	Won
NMU Madibaz	1 (6th)	6 (4th)	11 (3rd)	16 (2nd)	16 (4th)	18 (4th)	23 (4th)	Lost	—N/a
UWC	5 (2nd)	10 (1st)	10 (5th)	15 (3rd)	20 (2nd)	25 (2nd)	25 (3rd)	Lost	—N/a
WSU All Blacks	3 (5th)	8 (3rd)	13 (2nd)	14 (4th)	19 (3rd)	24 (3rd)	28 (2nd)	Won	Lost
CPUT	5 (3rd)	6 (6th)	11 (4th)	12 (5th)	13 (5th)	14 (5th)	15 (5th)	—N/a	—N/a
UKZN Impi	5 (1st)	6 (5th)	6 (6th)	11 (6th)	12 (6th)	14 (6th)	19 (5th)	—N/a	—N/a
FNB SBU	0 (7th)	1 (7th)	2 (7th)	2 (7th)	3 (8th)	3 (8th)	4 (8th)	—N/a	—N/a
UFH Blues	0 (8th)	0 (8th)	0 (8th)	0 (8th)	5 (7th)	10 (7th)	11 (7th)	—N/a	—N/a
The table above shows a team's progression throughout the season. For each round, their cumulative points total is shown with the overall log position in brackets.
Key:	win	draw	loss						

== Pool stage ==
The following matches were played in the 2026 Varsity Shield:

=== Round 1 ===
13 February 2026
15:00

UFH Blues	12–38	UWC
	Report

Davidson Rugby Field, Alice

13 February 2026
17:00

CPUT	30–20	NMU Madibaz
	Report

CPUT Sports Stadium, Cape Town

13 February 2026
19:00

WSU All Blacks	27–27	Wits
	Report

Buffalo City Stadium, East London

13 February 2026
19:00

UKZN Impi	46–15	FNB SBU
	Report

Peter Booysen Sports Park, Pietermaritzburg

=== Round 2 ===
20 February 2026
16:00

NMU Madibaz	60–32	UKZN Impi
	Report

NMU Stadium, Port Elizabeth

20 February 2026
17:00

UWC	51–34	CPUT
	Report

University of the Western Cape Stadium

20 February 2026
19:00

Wits	51–00	UFH Blues
	Report

Wits Rugby Stadium, Johannesburg

20 February 2026
19:00

FNB SBU	22–48	WSU All Blacks
	Report

Griqua Park, Kimberley

=== Round 3 ===
27 February 2026
17:00

UFH	11–49	NMU Madibaz
	Report

Davidson Rugby Field, Alice

27 February 2026
19:00

CPUT	56–25	FNB SBU
	Report

CPUT Sports Stadium, Cape Town

27 February 2026
19:00

UKZN Impi	03–55	Wits
	Report

Peter Booysen Sports Park, Pietermaritzburg

27 February 2026
19:00

WSU All Blacks	29–10	UWC
	Report

Buffalo City Stadium, East London

=== Round 4 ===
5 March 2026
19:00

UFH	10–20	UKZN Impi
	Report

Davidson Rugby Field, Alice

6 March 2026
16:00

NMU Madibaz	40–32	WSU All Blacks
	Report

NMU Stadium, Port Elizabeth

6 March 2026
17:00

Wits	66–22	CPUT
	Report

Wits Rugby Stadium, Johannesburg

6 March 2026
19:00

UWC	42–17	FNB SBU
	Report

University of the Western Cape Stadium

=== Round 5 ===
13 March 2026
16:00

NMU Madibaz	08-63	Wits
	Report

Madibaz Stadium, Port Elizabeth

13 March 2026
17:00

FNB SBU	34-61	UFH Blues
	Report

Suzuki Stadium, Kimberley

13 March 2026
19:00

UKZN Impi	15-22	UWC
	Report

Peter Booysen Sports Park, Pietermaritzburg

13 March 2026
19:00

CPUT	22-34	WSU All Blacks
	Report

CPUT Sports Stadium, Cape Town

=== Round 6 ===
19 March 2026
19:00

WSU All Blacks	27-20	UKZN Impi
	Report

Buffalo City Stadium, East London

20 March 2026
17:00

UWC	32-25	NMU Madibaz
	Report

University of the Western Cape Stadium

20 March 2026
19:00

UFH Blues	41-22	CPUT
	Report

Davidson Rugby Field, Alice

20 March 2026
19:00

Wits	89-07	FNB SBU
	Report

Wits Rugby Stadium, Johannesburg

=== Round 7 ===
27 March 2026
17:00

UKZN Impi	41-22	CPUT
	Report

Peter Booysen Sports Park, Pietermaritzburg

27 March 2026
19:00

FNB SBU	36-63	NMU Madibaz
	Report

Suzuki Stadium, Kimberley

27 March 2026
19:00

UWC	15-46	Wits
	Report

University of the Western Cape Stadium

27 March 2026
19:00

WSU All Blacks	15-13	UFH Blues
	Report

Buffalo City Stadium, East London

== Play-offs ==
Semi-finals
3 April 2026
WSU All Blacks	42
UWC	32
3 April 2026
Wits	68
NMU Madibaz	10

Final
10 April 2026
Wits	44
WSU All Blacks	18

=== Semi-finals ===
3 April 2026
14:30

WSU All Blacks	42-32	UWC
	Report

Buffalo City Stadium, East London

3 April 2026
17:00

Wits	68-10	NMU Madibaz
	Report

Wits Rugby Stadium, Johannesburg

=== Final ===
10 April 2026
19:00

Wits	44-18	WSU All Blacks
Try: Dweba 12', 50'; Nela 17'; Santos 20'; Kachungunu 28', 62'; Masondo 32', 43'; Con: Gerber 33', 44'	Report	Try: Zokoza 40', 43'; Tshayi 78'; Pen: Mbini (10 p)

Wits Rugby Stadium
FNB Player of the match - Christopher Kachungunu, (Wits)
Attendance: 5,000+
Referee: Eon van Zyl

Wits	WSU

FB	15	Latica Nela (c)
RW	14	Dustyn Holmes
OC	13	Kamohelo Ncunca
IC	12	Tirhani Masondo
LW	11	Lindani Dweba
FH	10	Rekkie Gerber
SH	9	Sherwin Buys
N8	8	Jamaal Feldman
OF	7	Christopher Kachungunu
BF	6	Liam Santos
RL	5	Hayden Munnery
LL	4	Lian Terblanche
TP	3	Meyer Opperman
HK	2	Bonga Nxumalo
LP	1	Ronan Dutton
Replacements:
	16	Dylan Piek
	17	Ricardo Brandao
	18	Miguel Smith
	19	Joshua Ferreira
	20	Marko Kok
	21	Gideon Diedericks
	22	Matthew Coetzee
	23	Oluwatimileyen Oluwole
Coach:
Hugo van As

FB	15	Isiphe Mbini
RW	14	Ahlule Zokoza
OC	13	Axola Mtalana
IC	12	Bulelani Nondlwana
LW	11	Sosulwe Mqonci
FH	10	Lukhangele Tshayi (c)
SH	9	Thembela Folo
N8	8	Sipho Hobosch
OF	7	Khanaye Mbakaza
BF	6	Siya Ncapayi
RL	5	Azasakhe Phuwani
LL	4	Luvo Zindela
TP	3	Yoyisa Mahobe
HK	2	Mangaliso Zixesha
LP	1	Mihlali Nohoyeka
Replacements:
	16	Sokhana Pampila
	17	Inathinkosi Mhlakaza
	18	Buhlebenkosi Kedama
	19	Sandisiwe Mkwayimba
	20	Lizole Hebe
	21	Sinethemba Buhlungu
	22	Pasco Mokoena
	23	Qhayiya Makhalima
Coach:
Thembani Mkokeli

Player of the Match:
Christopher Kachungunu

Assistant referees:
Lulutho Matomela (South Africa), Jonathan Lottering (South Africa)
Television match official:
Jaco Pretorius (South Africa)

=== Promotion and relegation ===
At the end of the Varsity Cup season, a promotion–relegation system determined the movement between the Varsity Cup and the Varsity Shield. The team that finished last in the Varsity Cup standings is automatically relegated to the Varsity Shield for the following season.

The winner of the Varsity Shield is automatically promoted to the Varsity Cup. In addition, the second-last placed Varsity Cup which was Emeris played a promotion–relegation playoff match against the Varsity Shield runner-up which was WSU All Blacks, with the winner earning a place in next season's Varsity Cup. Emeris came out on top and retained their place in the Varsity Cup for 2027.

6 May 2026
11:00 am

Emeris	47-12	WSU All Blacks
	Report

Varsity College, University of KwaZulu Natal

== Honours ==
The honour roll for the 2026 Varsity Shield was as follows:

2026 Varsity Shield Honours
Champions:	Wits (3rd Title)
Player That Rocks:	Lukhangele Tshayi, WSU All Blacks
Forward That Rocks:	Sipho Hobosch, WSU All Blacks
Back That Rocks:	Lukhangele Tshayi, WSU All Blacks
Rookie of the year:	Frederick Malgas, UKZN Impi
Top Try Scorer:	Mangaliso Zixesha (19 tries), WSU All Blacks
Top Points Scorer:	Rekkie Gerber (46 points), Wits
