= Vega School =

Tertiary educational institution in South Africa

Vega
- Motto: Design.Brand.Business
- Type: Private
- Established: 1999
- Administrative staff: Shevon Lurie (Managing Director)
- Location: South Africa
- Campus: 1 urban and 3 suburban campuses
- Colours: Dark blue, Red, and White
- Website: www.vegaschool.com

Vega (officially IIE Vega School) is a private tertiary education institution located in South Africa.

Founded in 1999, Vega forms part of the group of tertiary institutions operated by The Independent Institute of Education, South Africa's largest and most accredited tertiary education institution.

In 2026, it merged with Varsity College, HSM, and MSA (formerly known as Monash) to form Emeris.

The IIE is a wholly owned subsidiary of South African investment holding company ADvTECH Group Limited, and is responsible for developing, assessing, certifying, and overseeing the delivery of curricula at Vega's four campuses. Vega's language of instruction is English.

== Qualifications ==
Vega offers a broad range of IIE (The Independent Institute of Education) undergraduate and postgraduate tertiary qualifications, as well as a number of workshops and short courses, focused on business administration and marketing. Emphasis is placed on creating an academic environment consisting of small lecture groups, experiential learning, interactive lectures, the use of modern technology in the educational space, and lecturers who are actively engaged in their respective professional fields, so as to bring industry experience into the learning environment. Modes of delivery include full-time and part-time.

== Campuses ==
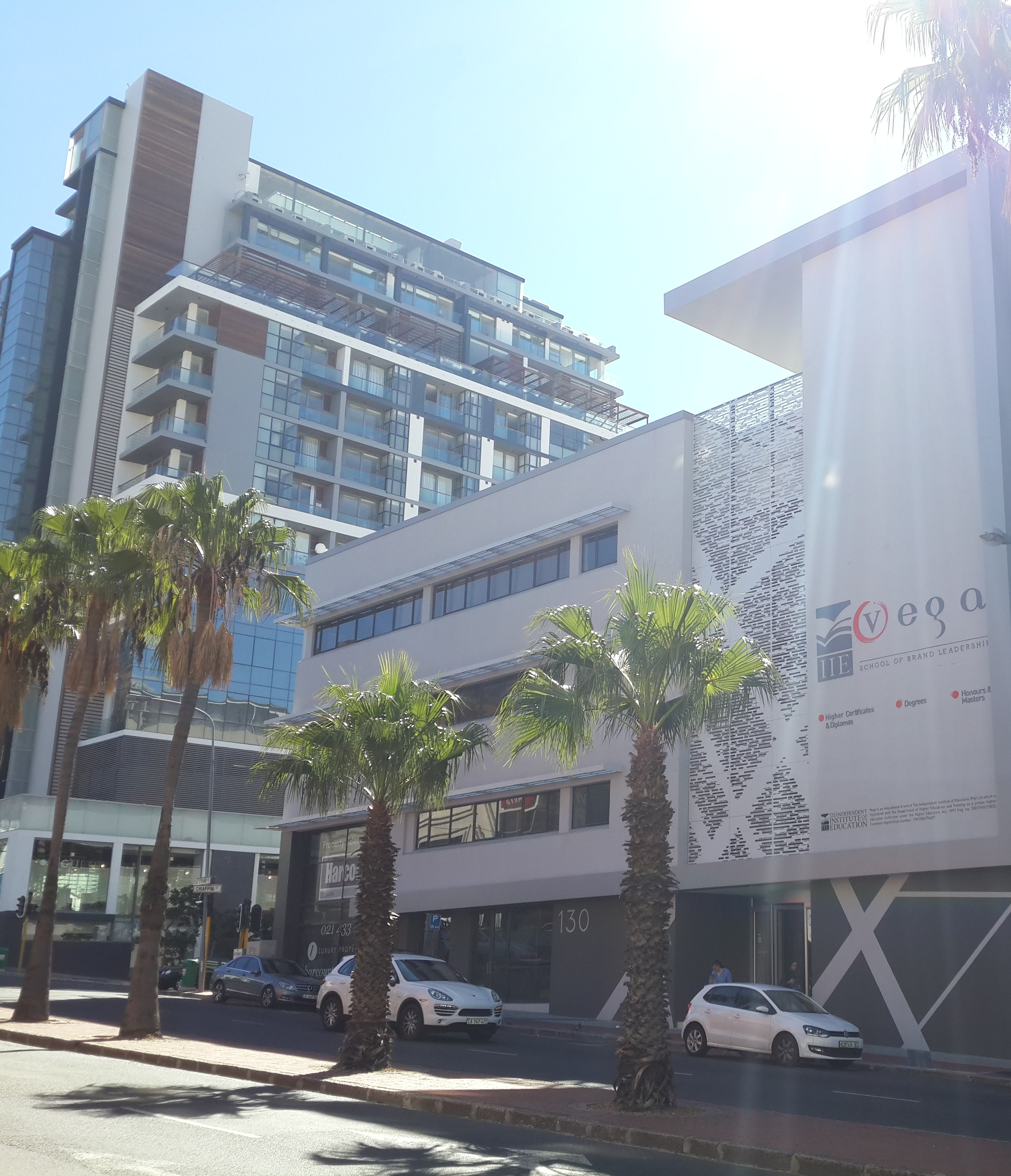
Vega's Cape Town campus.

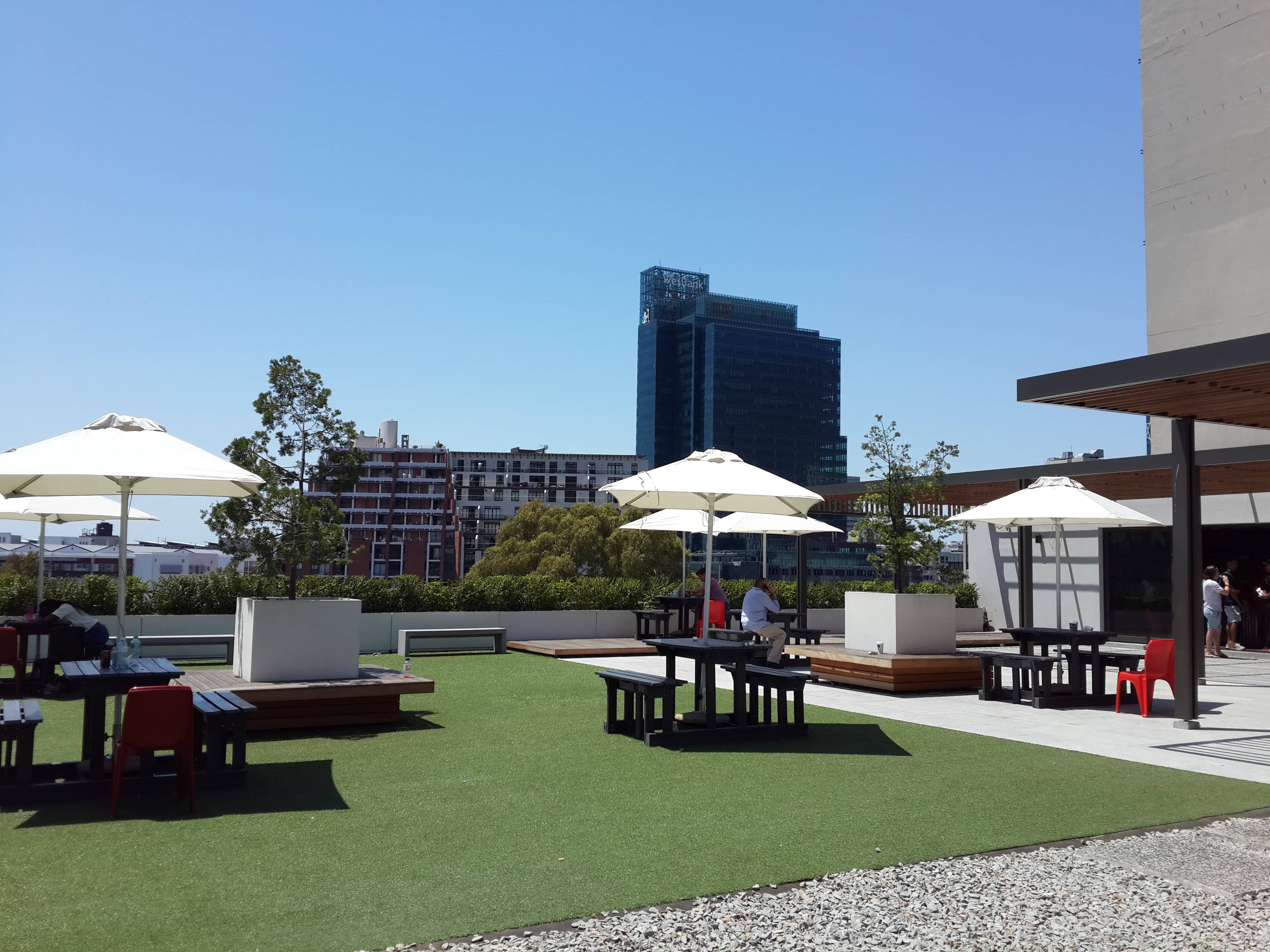
Rooftop social area at Vega's Cape Town campus, located in the De Waterkant sub-district of the Green Point neighborhood.

Vega has 4 campuses across South Africa, located in; Cape Town, Durban, Pretoria, and Johannesburg.

== Organisation ==
Vega's National Office is located in Johannesburg.

The executive head of Vega is the Managing Director, currently Shevon Lurie, who has the overall responsibility for the policy and administration of the college. Vega's National Academic Head is co-founder Dr Carla Enslin, who also serves as the Deputy Chair of the Board of the Brand Council of South Africa.

== Accreditation ==
The IIE is registered with the Department of Higher Education and Training as a private higher education provider, under the Higher Education Act, 1997. The IIE is also accredited by the British Accreditation Council.

== Associations and endorsements ==
Through the IIE's World of Work graduate placement programme, Vega has partnerships with and endorsements from a number of associations, including the Marketing Association of South Africa (MASA) and Brand South Africa.
