= Southdowns College =

Coordinates: 25°53′42″S 28°12′52″E

Location
- John Vorster Drive, Doringkloof, 0157; Centurion (City of Tshwane Metropolitan Municipality), Gauteng; South Africa

Information
- Former name: Southdowns College
- School type: Private & Boarding
- Motto: Enlightened Minds
- Established: 2007; 19 years ago
- Founders: Centurus (Pty) Ltd
- School district: District 9
- School number: 012 665 0244
- Exam board: IEB
- Headmaster: Ms Susan Thupane
- Grades: 000–12
- Gender: Boys & Girls
- Age: 3 to 18
- Enrollment: 1,300 pupils
- Language: English
- Schedule: 08:00 - 14:00
- Campus: Urban Campus
- Campus type: Suburban
- Houses: Neptune; Venus; Juventus; Minerva
- Colours: Beige; Maroon; White
- Mascot: Mongoose
- Nickname: SDC
- Rival: Cornwall Hill College; Midstream College
- Newspaper: The Southdowns Chronicles
- School fees: R120,200 (boarding); R142,400 (tuition).
- Website: https://www.southdownscollege.co.za/#gsc.tab=0

Southdowns College, also known as SDC, is a private, English medium co-educational primary and high school situated in Irene, Centurion, Gauteng, South Africa. The school is part of the Independent Schools Association of Southern Africa and writes the Independent Examinations Board examinations.

Southdowns College is part of the ADvTECH Group, which runs alongside other established educational brands such as Pinnacle Colleges, Trinityhouse Schools, Crawford International, Abbotts High Schools and Maragon Schools.

== History ==
The school sits on a reputed lost national heritage site reported to be location of a second concentration camp in the Irene region, the camp housed a small orphanage and a school.

The former executive headmaster of Cornwall Hill College, Chris Lee, conceptualized the school and Southdowns College was established in 2007 as a member of the Centurus Colleges group, the education subsidiary of Centurus (Pty) Ltd as part of a lifestyle and residential development vision alongside the Hennops River Valley and Irene Village. The Centurus Colleges group consisted of Pecanwood College, Tyger Valley College and Southdowns College.

The campus initially had pre-primary and primary schools. In 2008, the college introduced a junior high school and completed new primary and high school buildings, as well as an arena that houses Southdowns' dance academy and music studios. In 2010 the schools rugby fields were used by the Italian national soccer team during the 2010 FIFA world cup and the classes were used by their press team thus campus activities were temporarily relocated for a month to ensure the secrecy of their game.

Centurus Colleges were bought by AdvTech, Africa's largest education company and continued to operate alongside other AdvTech brands.

Under a corporate portfolio simplification, the Centurus Colleges brand is being dissolved by AdvTech. Starting 1 January 2027, Southdowns College is officially joining the Crawford International brand and becoming Crawford International Southdowns. This rebrand will include the changing of the logo, uniform and school colours to establish the Crawford brand. The other Centurus Colleges, Tyger Valley College and Pecanwood College, will also be rebranded to unify AdvTech's branding and administration. With Tyger Valley College becoming Trinityhouse Tyger Valley and Pecanwood College becoming Pinnacle College Pecanwood.

== Extra-curricular activities ==
Co-curricular activities include Netball, Soccer(girls & boys), swimming, rugby, chess, robotics, debating and public speaking.

== Sports ==
Southdowns College has been performing very well on sports during the year.

The sports at the school are:

- Archery
- Athletics
- Basketball
- Chess
- Cricket
- Cross country
- Hockey
- Netball
- Rowing
- Rugby
- Soccer
- Softball
- Squash
- Swimming
- Tennis
- Table tennis
- Water polo
