= 2026 Women's Varsity Cup =

South African college rugby competition

- Number of teams: 6
- Date: 6 March – 17 April 2026
- Champions: UFH Baby Blues
- Runners-up: UWC Women

The 2026 Women's Varsity Cup was the 4th season of the Women's Varsity Cup series in South Africa for women's rugby union. The tournament took place between six university teams and played between 6 March and 17 April 2026.

== Teams ==
Location of teams in the 2026 Women's Varsity Cup

The teams that played in the 2026 Varsity Cup were:

2026 Varsity Cup teams
Team name	University	Stadium
Maties Women	Stellenbosch University	Danie Craven Stadium, Stellenbosch
UJ Women	University of Johannesburg	UJ Stadium, Johannesburg
Tuks Women	University of Pretoria	Fanie du Toit Sport Ground, Potchefstroom
UFH Baby Blues	University of Fort Hare	Davidson Rugby Field, Alice
UKZN Women	University of KwaZulu-Natal	Peter Booysen Sports Park, Pietermaritzburg
UWC Women	University of the Western Cape	University of the Western Cape Stadium

== Standings ==
2026 Women's Varsity Cup standings
Pos	Team	Pld	W	D	L	PF	PA	PD	TF	TA	B	Pts	Qualification	TUKS	UWC	UKZN	UFH	UJ	Maties
1	Tuks Women	5	5	0	0	125	102	+23	0	0	3	23	Semi-finals	—	32–31	27–26			29–26
2	UWC Women	5	3	0	2	158	53	+105	0	0	5	17	Semi-finals		—		14–0	26–7	
3	UKZN Women	5	3	0	2	132	82	+50	0	0	5	17	Semi-finals		14–10	—	26–14		46–7
4	UFH Baby Blues	5	2	0	3	94	75	+19	0	0	2	10	Semi-finals	12–18			—	49–12	
5	UJ Women	5	2	0	3	92	121	−29	0	0	2	10		7–19		24–20		—	
6	Maties Women	5	0	0	5	45	213	−168	0	0	2	2			0–77		5–19	7–42	—

Source: Varsity Cup

== Pool stage ==
=== Round 1 ===
6 March 2026
15:00

UKZN Women	14–10	UWC Women
	Report

Howard College Stadium

6 March 2026
15:00

Maties Women	5–19	UFH Baby Blues
	Report

Danie Craven Stadium

6 March 2026
17:00

UJ Women	7–19	Tuks Women
	Report

UJ Stadium

=== Round 2 ===
12 March 2026
15:00

UKZN Women	26–14	UFH Baby Blues
	Report

Howard College Stadium

13 March 2026
15:00

UWC Women	26–7	UJ Women
	Report

UWC Sports Stadium

13 March 2026
15:00

Tuks Women	29–26	Maties Women
	Report

Tuks Stadium

=== Round 3 ===
20 March 2026
15:00

Maties Women	0–77	UWC Women
	Report

Danie Craven Stadium

20 March 2026
15:00

UFH Women	12–18	Tuks Women
	Report

Davidson Stadium

20 March 2026
15:00

UJ Women	24–20	UKZN Women
	Report

UJ Stadium

=== Round 4 ===
27 March 2026
15:00

Maties Women	7–42	UJ Women
	Report

Danie Craven Stadium

27 March 2026
15:00

Tuks Women	27–26	UKZN Women
	Report

Tuks Stadium

27 March 2026
16:00

UWC Women	14–0	UFH Baby Blues
	Report

UWC Sports Stadium

=== Round 5 ===
3 April 2026
15:00

UKZN Women	46–7	Maties Women
	Report

Peter Booysen Stadium

3 April 2026
15:00

Tuks Women	32–31	UWC Women
	Report

Tuks Stadium

3 April 2026
15:00

UFH Baby Blues	49–12	UJ Women
	Report

Davidson Stadium

== Semi-finals ==
Semi-finals
10 April
UWC Women	34
UKZN Women	17
10 April
Tuks Women	30
UFH Baby Blues	45

Final
17 April
UWC Women
UFH Baby Blues

10 April 2026
15:00

UWC Women	34–17	UKZN Women
	Report

UWC Sports Stadium

10 April 2026
15:00

Tuks Women	30–45	UFH Baby Blues
	Report

Tuks Stadium

== Final ==
17 April 2025
17:00

UWC Women	21-24	UFH Baby Blues
Try: Jada Davids; Amber Beukes; Ivanche Gerritsen	Report	Try: Mila Wawa; Litha Tofu; Lilitha Ngwenze; Siphokuhle Vakele

UWC Sports Stadium

UWC Women	UFH Baby Blues

Player of the Match:
Thokozani Sikela (UFH Baby Blues)

== See also ==
- 2026 Varsity Cup
