= 2026 Varsity Cup =

South African college rugby competition

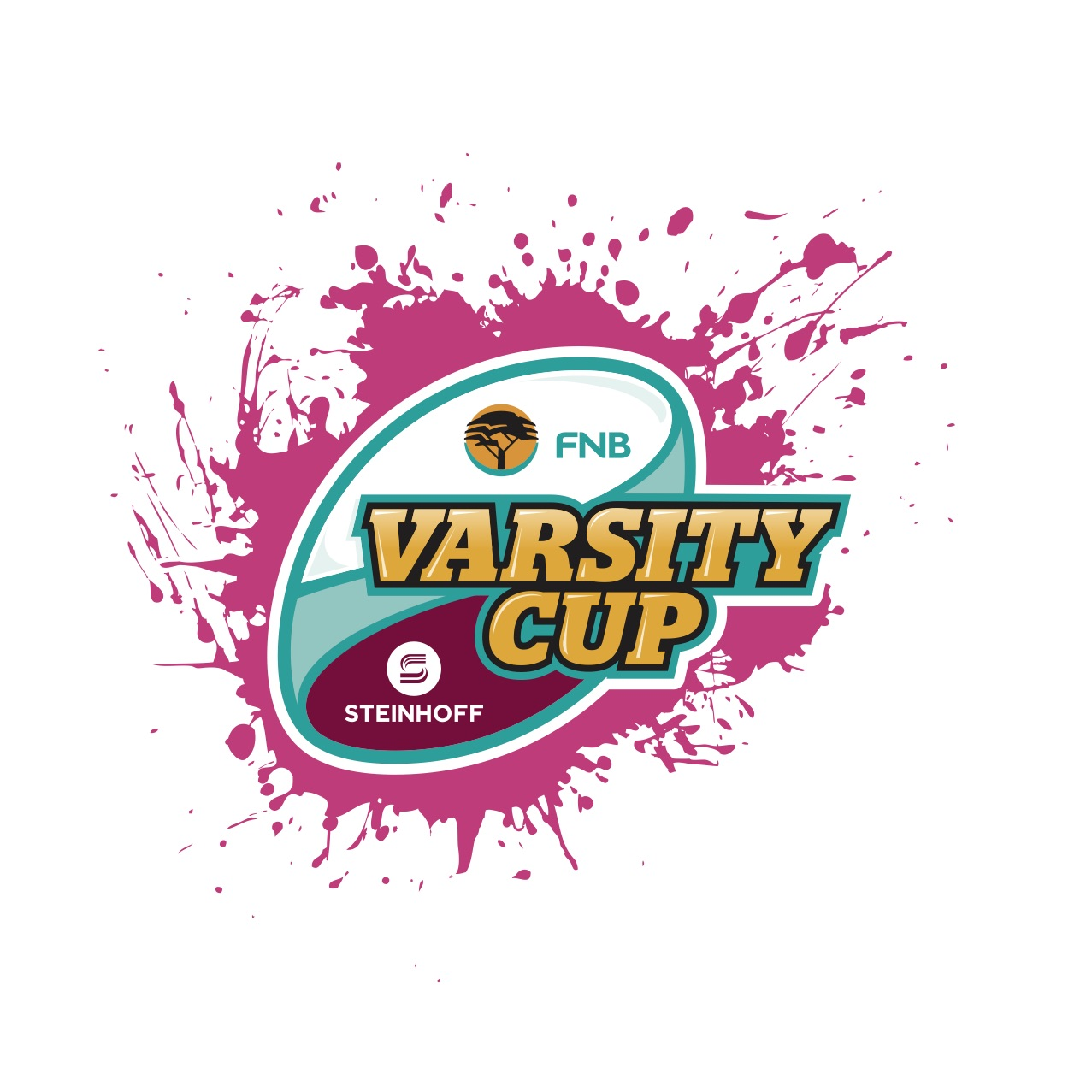
- Countries: South Africa
- Date: 16 February – 13 April 2026
- Champions: UP Tuks (6th title)
- Runners-up: NWU Eagles
- Promoted: Wits (2026 Varsity Shield)
- Relegated: CUT Ixias
- Matches played: 56
- Tries scored: 297 (average 5.3 per match)
- Top point scorer: Alex Vermeulen (82); UCT Ikey Tigers
- Top try scorer: Jack Benade (9); UCT Ikey Tigers

Official website
- varsitycup.co.za

The 2026 Varsity Cup was the 19th season of the Varsity Cup, the premier competition in the annual Varsity Rugby series in South Africa for men's rugby union. The tournament took place between eight university teams and played between 16 February and 13 April 2026. UP Tuks were crowned champions, securing a record sixth Varsity Cup title, the most by any team in the competition's history.

This competition forms part of the broader Varsity Rugby programme administered by Varsity Sport, which aims to promote university rugby and provide a pathway for emerging talent into professional rugby structures. Matches were broadcast nationally on SuperSport.

The UCT Ikey Tigers entered the 2026 season as the former winners of the Varsity Cup Trophy after beating Maties in the 2025 final. The 2026 edition was staged under the campaign theme "Who's NXT?", highlighting Varsity Cup's role as a launchpad for future professional and international players and introducing the new Tap-or-Kick post-try power play law to further encourage attacking rugby. Matches were broadcast nationally on SuperSport.

== Competition rules and information ==
Eight university teams participated in the 2026 Varsity Cup. During the pool stage, each team played the other seven sides once, either home or away.

Teams were awarded:

- four points for a win
- two points for a draw
- one bonus point for scoring four or more tries in a match
- one bonus point for losing by seven points or fewer

Teams were ranked primarily by log points, and then by points difference (points scored minus points conceded).

The top four teams at the conclusion of the pool stage advanced to the semi-finals. The two highest-ranked teams hosted the semi-finals, and the highest-ranked remaining finalist hosted the final.

== Teams ==
Location of teams in the 2026 Varsity Cup
Western Cape

The teams that played in the 2026 Varsity Cup were:

2026 Varsity Cup teams
Team name	University	Stadium
NWU Eagles	North-West University	Fanie du Toit Sport Ground, Potchefstroom
Maties	Stellenbosch University	Danie Craven Stadium, Stellenbosch
UFS Shimlas	University of the Free State	Shimla Park, Bloemfontein
UCT Ikey Tigers	University of Cape Town	UCT Rugby Fields, Cape Town
Emeris	Varsity College	University of KwaZulu Natal
UJ	University of Johannesburg	UJ Stadium, Johannesburg
CUT Ixias	Central University of Technology	CUT Stadium, Bloemfontein
UP Tuks	University of Pretoria	Fanie du Toit Sport Ground, Potchefstroom

=== Team records ===
Team	Champions	Runners-up	Third/Fourth	Apps to knockouts	Relegations
UP Tuks	6 (2012, 2013, 2017, 2021, 2022, 2026)	2 (2011, 2019)	5 (2008, 2009, 2015, 2016, 2025)	13	1 (2023)
Maties	5 (2008, 2009, 2010, 2018, 2019)	6 (2012, 2013, 2016, 2017, 2022, 2025)	5 (2014, 2021, 2023, 2024, 2026)	16	—N/a
UCT Ikey Tigers	3 (2011, 2014, 2025)	5 (2008, 2010, 2021, 2023, 2024)	3 (2009, 2015, 2022)	11	—N/a
NWU Pukke	2 (2016, 2023)	5 (2009, 2014, 2015, 2018, 2026)	6 (2008, 2010, 2012, 2019, 2024)	13	—N/a
UFS Shimlas	2 (2015, 2024)	—N/a	7 (2011, 2012, 2013, 2016, 2017, 2018, 2026)	9	—N/a
UJ	—N/a	—N/a	7 (2010, 2011, 2017, 2019, 2022, 2023, 2025)	7	—N/a
NMMU Madibaz	—N/a	—N/a	2 (2013, 2014)	2	1 (2018)
Wits	—N/a	—N/a	1 (2018)	1	2 (2014, 2025)
UWC	—N/a	—N/a	—N/a	—N/a	1 (2024)
CUT Ixias	—N/a	—N/a	—N/a	—N/a	1 (2026)
TUT Vikings	—N/a	—N/a	—N/a	—N/a	1 (2012)
Emeris	—N/a	—N/a	—N/a	—N/a	—N/a

== Standings ==
=== 2026 Varsity Cup Log ===
The final log for the 2026 Varsity Cup was:

2026 Varsity Cup log
Pos	Team	P	W	D	L	PF	PA	PD	TF	TA	TB	LB	BP	Pts
1	UP Tuks	7	6	0	1	287	154	133	43	21	7	0	7	31
2	NWU Eagles	7	5	0	2	308	228	80	46	34	6	2	8	28
3	Maties	7	5	0	2	252	178	74	41	20	6	0	6	26
4	UJ	7	4	0	3	223	277	-54	32	40	5	0	5	21
5	UCT Ikey Tigers	7	3	0	4	317	240	77	41	37	5	2	7	19
6	UFS Shimlas	7	3	0	4	250	244	6	39	32	3	1	4	16
7	Emeris	7	2	0	5	153	254	-101	30	44	4	1	5	13
8	CUT Ixias	7	0	0	7	148	358	-194	25	60	3	1	4	4
*Legend: Pos = Position, Pl = Played, W = Won, D = Drawn, L = Lost, PF = Points for, PA = Points against, PD = Points difference, TF = Tries for, TA = Tries against, TB = Try bonus points, LB = Losing bonus points, Pts = Log points Points breakdown: *4 points for a win *2 points for a draw *1 bonus point for a loss by seven points or less *1 bonus point for scoring four or more tries in a match Qualification: The top four teams qualified for the semifinals.

=== Round-by-round ===
Team Progression – 2026 Varsity Cup
Team	R1	R2	R3	R4	R5	R6	R7	Semi	Final
UCT Ikey Tigers	0 (8th)	5 (4th)	10 (4th)	15 (3rd)	15 (5th)	17 (5th)	19 (5th)	—N/a	—N/a
Maties	1 (5th)	6 (3rd)	6 (6th)	11 (5th)	16 (3rd)	21 (3rd)	26 (3rd)	Lost	—N/a
UFS Shimlas	5 (4th)	5 (6th)	10 (3rd)	11 (4th)	11 (6th)	16 (6th)	16 (6th)	—N/a	—N/a
UP Tuks	5 (3rd)	10 (2nd)	15 (1st)	20 (1st)	21 (2nd)	26 (1st)	31 (1st)	Won	Won
UJ	5 (1st)	5 (5th)	10 (5th)	11 (6th)	16 (4th)	21 (4th)	21 (4th)	Lost	—N/a
CUT Ixias	1 (7th)	2 (7th)	2 (7th)	2 (7th)	4 (8th)	4 (8th)	4 (8th)	—N/a	—N/a
NWU Eagles	5 (2nd)	10 (1st)	12 (2nd)	17 (2nd)	22 (1st)	23 (2nd)	28 (2nd)	Won	Lost
Emeris	1 (6th)	1 (8th)	1 (8th)	1 (8th)	6 (7th)	8 (7th)	13 (7th)	—N/a	—N/a
The table above shows a team's progression throughout the season. For each round, their cumulative points total is shown with the overall log position in brackets.
Key:	win	draw	loss						

== Pool stage ==
Results

The following matches were played in the 2026 Varsity Cup:

=== Round 1 ===
16 February 2026
16:45

UFS Shimlas	50–39	Maties
Try: du Preez 15'; Botha 18'; Jacobus 24, 41'; Kleynhans 56'; Shamburg 63'; Con: Pierre Giddy 16' (4); Pen: Pierre Giddy (76 p), (78 p); Cards: Shamburg (yellow card) 83'	Report	Try: Mpofu 27'; Rynhardt 35'; Marx 37'; Christiaan 40'; Combrinck 44'; Erasmus 82'; Poswa 84'; Con: Christiaan

UWC Sport Stadium, Cape Town
Referee: Jonathan Lottering
FNB Player of the Match - Liam Shamburg UFS Shimlas

16 February 2026
19:00

CUT Ixias	42–59	NWU Eagles
Try: Seyoko; Swartbooi; Muller; Jacobs; Con: Myburgh; Pen: Myburgh (p); Cards: Frans (yellow card)	Report	Try: Prins (2); Venter; McLoughlin; Krugel; Doyi; Du Bois; Turner; De Villiers; Con: Mostert; Van Willing; Cards: McLoughlin (yellow card)

CUT Stadium, Bloemfontein
Referee: Juan de Bod
FNB Player of the Match - Kehan Myburgh CUT

16 February 2026
19:00

UJ	61–41	Emeris
Try: Du Toit (2); Mphafi; Gabreilsen; Marimo; Ferreira; Africa; Molefe; Sibisi; Con: Gabrielsen (3); Pen: Gabrielsen (p); Jt Kapank (p); Cards: Africa (yellow card)	Report	Try: Marais; Orde Steyl; Okota; Sigauke; Con: Marx (2); Cards: Davis (yellow card)

UJ Stadium, Johannesburg
Referee: Sean Muller
FNB Player of the Match - Zian Cilliers UJ

16 February 2026
19:00

UP Tuks	38–22	UCT Ikey Tigers
Try: Smith 4'; Myeni 12', 21'; Pretorius 33'; Kobus 67'; Ntshangase 77'; Con: Divan 5', 34'	Report	Try: Davids 0'; Benade 7'; Aidan Norris 70'; Pen: Vermeulen (19 p)

LC de Villiers Stadium, Pretoria
Referee: Dylen November
FNB Player of the Match - Divan Du Toit UP Tuks

=== Round 2 ===
23 February 2026
16:45

NWU Eagles	63–15	Emeris
Try: Prins 14'; Van Zyl 22'; Luan 27'; McLoughlin 30'; Oosthuizen 39'; Prins; Fourie 47'; Van Zyl 55'; Prins 68'; Prins 75'; Con: Moster 22', 28', 40', 48'; Van Willing 56', 76'; Cards: Serfontein (yellow card) 63'	Report	Try: Okonta 10'; Siguake 63'; Etzebeth 64' Etzebeth 76'; Cards: Mbonambi (yellow card) 27'; Ncwana (yellow card) 27'

Fanie du Toit Sport Ground, Potchefstroom
FNB Player of the Match - Therlow Prins NWU Eagles
Referee: Zoe Naude

23 February 2026
19:00

UCT Ikey Tigers	83–34	CUT Ixias
Try: Norris (2); Benade (2); Miller (2); Beckett Jack Gordon; Vermeulen; Mokoena; Brawen; Con: Vermeulen (7)	Report	Try: Swartbooi; Myburgh; Abrahams; Gouveia; Vergotine; Shebu; Con: Myburgh (2); Cards: Taljaard (yellow card)

UCT Rugby Fields, Cape Town
Referee: Eon van Zyl
FNB Player of the Match - Jack Benade UCT Ikey Tigers

23 February 2026
19:00

UFS Shimlas	22–38	UP Tuks
Try: Mobo; De Beer; Visser; Con: Giddy; Ray; Pen: Ray (p)	Report	Try: Valentine 23'; Smith 48'; Nortje 64'; Kunene 76'; Con: Du Toit 23'; Du Toit 48'; Pen: Du Toit (4)

Shimla Park, Bloemfontein
Referee: Juan de Bod
FNB Player of the Match - Divan du Toit UP Tuks

23 February 2026
19:00

Maties	39–19	UJ
Try: Rynhardt 18'; Marx 45'; Erasmus 62'; Volmoer 65'; Manuel 72'; Ngobeni 76'; Con: Christiaan 46'; Christiaan 63'; Christiaan 77'; Pen: Christiaan (31 p); Cards: Strydom (yellow card) 60'	Report	Try: Molefa 20'; Mphafi 32'; Con: Gabrielsen 21'; Gabrielsen 33'; Pen: Gabrielsen (54 p); Cards: Swarts (yellow card) 75'

Danie Craven Stadium, Stellenbosch
Referee: Lulutho Matomela
FNB Player of the Match - CJ Marx Maties

=== Round 3 ===
2 March 2026
16:45

UJ	35-29	NWU Eagles
Try: Cilliers 10'; Africa 14', 28'; Cilliers 20'; Molefe 78'; Con: Kapank 11', 14', 21', 29'; Cards: Strydom (yellow card) 23'; Ferreira (yellow card) 55'; Prinsloo (yellow card) 79'	Report	Try: McLoughlin 7' van der Walt 38'; Fourie 43', 64', 65'; Con: Mostert 39'; Cards: Serfontein (yellow card) 46'; Engelbercht (yellow card) 59' du Bois (yellow card) 67'

UJ Stadium, Johannesburg
FNB Player of the Match - Zian Cilliers UJ
Referee: Jonathan Lottering

2 March 2026
19:00

UP Tuks	33-17	Maties
Try: Fourie (2); Austin; Van Vuuren; Dukuswa; Con: Du Toit (3); Cards: Myeni (yellow card)	Report	Try: Manuel; Erasmus; Con: Christiaan (2); Pen: Christiaan (p) (1); Cards: Burton (yellow card); Hahn (yellow card)

LC de Villiers Stadium, Pretoria
FNB Player of the Match - Jayd Austin UP Tuks
Referee: Eon van Zyl

2 March 2026
19:00

CUT Ixias	19-71	UFS Shimlas
Try: Abrahams 57', 75'; Vergotine 67'; Cards: Corneluis Malan (yellow card) 25'; Van Aswegen (yellow card) 35'; Holiday (yellow card) 45'	Report	Try: Visser 2'; Bezuidenhout 11', 15', 21', 43'; Vergottini 26', 35', 51'; Van Heerden 27', 35'; Kriek 64'; Winter 79'; Stopforth 80'; Con: Ray 16'; Kriek 52', 65'; Cards: Kriek (yellow card) 67'

CUT Stadium, Bloemfontein
FNB Player of the Match - Jaco Bezuidenhout UFS Shimlas
Referee: Caleb Hibbert

2 March 2026
19:00

Emeris	10-32	UCT Ikey Tigers
Try: Sigauke; Davis; Cards: Number 25 (yellow card) 22'	Report	Try: L. Davis; K. Davis; Benade; De Waal; Con: Vermeulen (4); Cards: Mokoena (yellow card)

Emeris, Durban North
Referee: Daniel Canhenga
FNB Player of the Match - Alex Vermuelen UCT Ikey Tigers

=== Round 4 ===
9 March 2026
16:45

UCT Ikey Tigers	87-28	UJ
Try: Benade 3', 21', 52'; Davis 10', 26'; Mokoena 13', 40'; Daars 17'; De Costa 28'; Norris 36'; Nyali 75'; Con: Vermeulen 3', 11', 13', 17', 21', 27', 29', 37', 41', 53', 77'; Cards: Vorster (yellow card) 61'; Whitson (yellow card) 73'	Report	Try: Ferreira 11'; Strydom 65'; Engelbercht 69'; Mashigo 71'; Con: Gabrielsen 11'; Cards: Masimola (yellow card) 76'

UCT Rugby Fields, Cape Town
Attendance: 4,000+
FNB Player of the Match - Monray Daars UCT Ikey Tigers
Referee: Lulutho Matomela

9 March 2026
19:00

Maties	55-20	Emeris
Try: Van Zitters 19'; Badenhorst 29', 50'; Hahn 33'; Poswa 34'; Ngobeni 40'; Erasmus 42'; Liversage 66', 74'; Con: Van Heerden Smith 19', 29', 42', 51'	Report	Try: Okonta 48'; Sigauke 52', 79'; Pen: Marx (5 p); Cards: Luthuli (yellow card) 39'

Danie Craven Stadium, Stellenbosch
Attendance: 16,000+
FNB Player of the Match - Samuel Badenhorst Maties
Referee: Zoe Naude

9 March 2026
19:00

UP Tuks	78-17	CUT Ixias
Try: Pretorius (3); Myeni (3); Fourie (2); Van Vuuren; Kunene; Van Rensburg; Smith; Con: Du Toit (4); De Leeuw (1); Cards: Myeni (yellow card)	Report	Try: Davids (2); Nel; Cards: Abrahams (yellow card)

LC de Villiers Stadium, Pretoria
Attendance: 14,150
FNB Player of the Match - Ben Jansen Van Vuuren UP Tuks
Referee: Jonathan Lottering

9 March 2026
19:00

UFS Shimlas	31-43	NWU Eagles
Try: Visser (2); De Beer; Du Preez; Con: Kriek (2)	Report	Try: Fourie (2); McLoughlin; Oosthuizen; Serfontein; Prins; Fortuin; Con: Can Willing (2); Cards: Du Toit (yellow card); Anonymous (yellow card) (2)

Fanie du Toit Sport Ground, Potchefstroom
Attendance: 4,500
FNB Player of the Match - Ricardo Fourie NWU Eagles
Referee: Eon van Zyl

=== Round 5 ===
16 March 2026
16:45

UCT Ikey Tigers	07-34	Maties
Try: Benade 47'; Cards: (yellow card)	Report	Try: Botha 6'; Basson 43', 45'; Ngobeni 41'; Poswa 42'; Volmoer 80'

UCT Rugby Fields, Cape Town
Referee: Juan de Bod
FNB Player of the Match - Ezekiel Ngobeni (Maties)

16 March 2026
19:00

UJ	29-17	UFS Shimlas
Try: Prinsloo (2); Engelbercht; Gamede; Con: Kapank (3); Pen: Kapank (p); Cards: Mphafi (yellow card); Anonymous (yellow card)	Report	Try: Visser (2); Laubscher; Con: Botha; Cards: Venter (yellow card); Anonymous (yellow card); Anonymous (yellow card)

UJ Stadium, Johannesburg
Referee: Caleb Hibbert
FNB Player of the Match - Thabang Mphafi (UJ)

16 March 2026
19:00

Emeris	26-24	CUT Ixias
Try: Okonta (2); Marais; Luthuli; Con: Marx (2); Cards: Anonymous (yellow card); Anonymous (yellow card)	Report	Try: Muller (2); Abrahams; Corneluis Malan; Con: Myburgh; Cards: Muller (yellow card)

Emeris, Durban North
Referee: Dylen November
FNB Player of the Match - Chijindu Okonta (Emeris)

16 March 2026
19:00

NWU Eagles	30-22	UP Tuks
Try: Serfontein 7'; Petersen 18'; McLoughlin 26'; Van Der Walt 45'; Con: Van Willing 7', 19', 27', 46'	Report	Try: Mjawule 38'; Myeni 41'; Van Der Merwe 62', 70'; Con: Du Toit 63'; Cards: De Meyer (yellow card) 15'

Fanie du Toit Sport Ground, Potchefstroom
Referee: Hernus Coetzee
FNB Player of the Match - Zack Serfontein (NWU Eagles)

=== Round 6 ===
23 March 2026
16:45

CUT Ixias	13–29	UJ
Try: Louis Theron 70'; Pen: Myburgh (30 p), (41 p); Cards: Nel (yellow card) 33'	Report	Try: Prinsloo 10'; Kapank 58'; Engelbercht 67'; Koekman 74'; Kevani 76'; Con: Kapank 75'; Cards: Sibisi (yellow card) 1'

CUT Stadium, Bloemfontein
FNB Player of the Match - Jeandre Uithaler (UJ)
Referee: Daniel Canhenga

23 March 2026
19:00

UP Tuks	27–24	Emeris
Try: Fourie (3); Engongo; Smith; Con: Du Toit; Cards: Planga (yellow card)	Report	Try: Mbonambi; Sigauke; Fortuin; Marais; Con: Marx (2); Cards: Horak (yellow card)

LC de Villiers Stadium, Pretoria
FNB Player of the Match - Jean Fourie (UP Tuks)
Referee: Eon van Zyl

23 March 2026
19:00

Maties	30–26	NWU Eagles
Try: Michaels; Marx; Poswa; Du Toit; Fourie; Con: Van Heerden Smith; Pen: Van Heerden Smith (p)	Report	Try: Janeke; Petersen; Venter; Con: Van Willing (2); Pen: Van Willing (p)

Danie Craven Stadium, Stellenbosch
Attendance: 15,000+
Referee: Hernus Coetzee
FNB Player of the Match - Ruan van Willing (NWU Eagles)

23 March 2026
19:00

UFS Shimlas	40–33	UCT Ikey Tigers
Try: Hofmeyer 13'; Bezuidenhout 35', 78'; Du Preez 47'; Visser 53'; Vergottini 68'; Con: Pierre Giddy 14', 48', 53', 68'	Report	Try: Louw 18'; Brawen 59'; Benade 61'; Lombard 64'; Con: Vermeulen 19', 60', 61'; Pen: Vermeulen (40 p); Cards: De Costa (yellow card) 33'; De Waal (red card) 76'; Lombard (yellow card) 77'

Fanie du Toit Sport Ground, Potchefstroom
FNB Player of the Match - Henri van Heerden (UFS Shimlas)
Referee: Jonathan Lottering

=== Round 7 ===
30 March 2026
16:45

NWU Eagles	56-53	UCT Ikey Tigers
Try: Van Der Walt 5'; Janeke 25', 35'; McLoughlin 41'; Buthelezi 42'; Serfontein 46'; Mostert 58', 76'; Otto 66'; Con: Mostert 36', 67'; Van Willing 77'; Pen: Van Willing (40 p); Cards: Krugel (yellow card) 5'; Du Bois (yellow card) 7'; Janeke (yellow card) 12'	Report	Try: Vermeulen 0'; Daars 9'; Basson 14'; Davis 22'; Gordon 33'; Mazibuko 50'; Mokoena 62'; Con: Vermeulen 1', 10', 15', 23', 34', 51', 63'; Cards: Gordon (yellow card) 42'; Basson (red card) 52'

Fanie du Toit Sport Ground, Potchefstroom
FNB Player of the Match - MJ Mostert (NWU Eagles)
Referee: Juan de Bod

30 March 2026
19:00

UJ	22-51	UP Tuks
Try: Sibisi 7'; Kevani 18'; Uithaler 60'; Con: Kapank 19'; Pen: Kapank (10 p); Cards: Fourie (yellow card) 68'	Report	Try: Vlok 12'; Oberholzer 15'; Obi 26'; Kunene 35'; Mjawule 57'; Smith 73'; Dukuswa 78'; Con: Du Toi 13', 16', 27', 36', 79'

UJ Stadium, Johannesburg
FNB Player of the Match - Divan du Toit (UP Tuks)
Referee: Caleb Hibbert

30 March 2026
19:00

CUT Ixias	22-38	Maties
Try: Malothane; Seyaga; Vergotine; Con: Malan; Pen: Malan (p) (2); Cards: (yellow card) (2)	Report	Try: Erasmus (3); Van Heerden Smith; Fourie; Burton; Con: Van Heerden Smith (2); Ngobeni; Cards: (yellow card) (2)

CUT Stadium, Bloemfontein
FNB Player of the Match - Tsebano Stemer (CUT Ixias)
Referee: Eon van Zyl

30 March 2026
19:00

Emeris	41-19	UFS Shimlas
Try: Barnard (2); Sigauke (2); Els; Marais; Jordaan; Con: Marx (2)	Report	Try: Bezuidenhout; Van Rensbug; Vergottini; Con: Botha; Cards: (yellow card) (2)

Emeris, Durban North
FNB Player of the Match - Jacques Marais Emeris
Referee: Lulutho Matomela

== Play-offs ==
Semi-finals
6 April 2026
NWU Eagles	50
Maties	10
6 April 2026
UP Tuks	53
UJ	34

Final
13 April 2026
UP Tuks	31
NWU Eagles	03

=== Semi-finals ===
6 April 2026
16:45

NWU Eagles	50-10	Maties
Try: Roulston 24'; McLoughlin 43'; Krugel 48'; Janeke 58', 76'; Dampies 63'; Otto 72'; Con: Mostert 25', 44', 59', 64', 73', 77'; Pen: Mostert (15 p)	Report	Try: Basson 8'; Con: van Heerden Smith 8'; Pen: van Heerden Smith (25 p); Cards: Ngobeni (yellow card) 37'

Fanie du Toit Sport Ground, Potchefstroom
Attendance: 5,000+
Referee: Hernus Coetzee
FNB Player of the Match - Ricardo Fourie NWU Eagles

6 April 2026
19:00

UP Tuks	53-34	UJ
Try: Dukuswa 19', 62', 80'; Janse Van Rensburg 43'; Fourie 55'; Mjawule 68'; Oberholzer 75'; Con: Du Toit 44', 76', 80'; Pen: Du Toit (40 p)	Report	Try: Sibisi 3', 78'; Molefe 41'; Kapank 65'; Con: Kapank 42', 66'; Pen: Kapank (36 p); Cards: Uithaler (yellow card) 8'; Koekman (yellow card) 29'; Mthiyana (yellow card) 54'; Reuven Ferreira (yellow card) 72'

LC de Villiers Stadium, Pretoria
Attendance: 10,000+
Referee: Jonathan Lottering
FNB Player of the Match - Akha Mjawule UP Tuks

=== Final ===
13 April 2026
19:00

UP Tuks	31-03	NWU Eagles
Try: Penalty try 32'; Myeni 44'; Fourie 50'; Pen: du Toit '26, '53, '75, '78; Cards: Dukuswa (yellow card) 18'; Vlok (yellow card) 40'	Report	Pen: Mostert '18; Cards: du Bois (yellow card) 33'

LC de Villiers Stadium, Pretoria
Attendance: 14,150+
Referee: Hernus Coetzee
FNB Player that rocks - Andile Myeni, UP Tuks

Tuks	NWU Eagles

FB	15	Hopewell Ntshangase
RW	14	Andile Myeni
OC	13	Christiaan Vlok
IC	12	Kobus Janse Van Rensburg
LW	11	Muashe Dukudwa
FH	10	Divan du Toit
SH	9	Akha Mjawule
N8	8	Dillon Smith (c)
OF	7	Oelof de Meyer
BF	6	Abel Pretorius
RL	5	Duncan Blignaut
LL	4	David Engongo
TP	3	Jayd Austin
HK	2	Jean Fourie
LP	1	Buhle Mphaka
Replacements:
	16	Gustav van der Merwe
	17	Randy Muzungu
	18	Barnard Nortje
	19	Jacques Oberholzer
	20	Guvandre Moses
	21	Ignatius Jatjies
	22	Dennis Obi
	23	Van Reenen Kruger
Coach:
Dewey Swartbooi

FB	15	Luan van der Walt
RW	14	Luyolo Doyi
OC	13	Matthew Fortuin
IC	12	Leejay Peterson
LW	11	Logan Janeke
FH	10	MJ Mostert
SH	9	Zack Serfontein
N8	8	Sean Roulston
OF	7	Guhan du Bios
BF	6	Ricardo Fourie
RL	5	Rianiel Turner
LL	4	Stephan Krugel (c)
TP	3	Jason Oosthuizen
HK	2	Jordan McLoughlin
LP	1	Aletha Buthelezi
Replacements:
	16	Hanro Venter
	17	Bradley Stanfliet
	18	Jaco du Toit
	19	Zihan Bensch
	20	Schalk du Plessis
	21	Gary Otto
	22	Angelo Daniels
	23	Jamiane Dampies
Coach:
Burger van Westhuizen

Player of the Match:
Andile Myeni, UP Tuks

Assistant referees:
Paul Mente (South Africa), Jonathan Lottering (South Africa)
Television match official:
Jaco Pretorius (South Africa),Stephan Geldenhuys (South Africa)

=== Promotion and relegation ===
At the end of the Varsity Cup season, a promotion–relegation system determined the movement between the Varsity Cup and the Varsity Shield. The team that finished last in the Varsity Cup standings is automatically relegated to the Varsity Shield for the following season.

The winner of the Varsity Shield is automatically promoted to the Varsity Cup. In addition, the second-last placed Varsity Cup which was Emeris played a promotion–relegation playoff match against the Varsity Shield runner-up which was WSU All Blacks, with the winner earning a place in next season's Varsity Cup. Emeris came out on top and retained their place in the Varsity Cup for 2027.

6 May 2026
11:00 am

Emeris	47-12	WSU All Blacks
	Report

Varsity College, University of KwaZulu Natal

== Statistics ==
* Correct as at the end of regular season - 31 March 2026 (Round 7)

=== Points leaders ===
Rank	Player	University	Points
1	Alex Vermeulen	UCT Ikey Tigers	82
2	Jack Benade	UCT Ikey Tigers	51
3	Divan Du Toit	UP Tuks	48
4	Christiaan Van Heerden Smith	Maties	45
5	Edward Sigauke	Emeris	44
6	Jacobus Bezuidenhout	UFS Shimlas	40
7	MJ Mostert	NWU Eagles	36
T8	Erich Visser	UFS Shimlas	35
T8	Jean Fourie	UP Tuks	35
T8	CJ Erasmus	Maties	35

=== Tries leaders ===
Rank	Player	University	Tries
1	Jack Benade	UCT Ikey Tigers	9
T2	Jacobus Bezuidenhout	UFS Shimlas	8
T2	Edward Sigauke	Emeris	8
T4	CJ Erasmus	Maties	7
T4	Erich Visser	UFS Shimlas	7
T4	Jean Fourie	UP Tuks	7
T7	Ricardo Fourie	NWU Eagles	6
T7	Therlow Prins	NWU Eagles	6
T7	Andile Myeni	UP Tuks	6
T7	Jordan Mcloughlin	NWU Eagles	6

=== Conversion leaders ===
Rank	Player	University	Cons
1	Alex Vermeulen	UCT Ikey Tigers	32
2	Divan Du Toit	UP Tuks	18
T3	MJ Mostert	NWU Eagles	13
T3	Christiaan Van Heerden Smith	Maties	13
5	Ruan Van Willing	NWU Eagles	12
T6	Bradley Pierre Giddy	UFS Shimlas	9
T6	JT Kapank	UJ	9
8	Frederick Marx	Emeris	8
T9	Nicallen Gabrielsen	UJ	6
T9	Kehan Myburgh	CUT Ixias	6

=== Penalty leaders ===
Rank	Player	University	Pens
1	Kehan Myburgh	CUT Ixias	5
2	Divan Du Toit	UP Tuks	4
3	JT Kapank	UJ	3
T4	Bradley Pierre Giddy	UFS Shimlas	2
T4	Nicallen Gabrielsen	UJ	2
T4	Alex Vermeulen	UCT Ikey Tigers	2
T4	Ruan Van Willing	NWU Eagles	2
T4	Christiaan Van Heerden Smith	Maties	2
T9	Shaun Ray	UFS Shimlas	1
T9	Frederick Marx	Emeris	1

== Honours ==
The honour roll for the 2026 Varsity Cup was as follows:

2026 Varsity Cup Honours
Champions:	UP Tuks (6th title)
Player That Rocks:	Thabang Mphafi, UJ
Forward That Rocks:	Ricardo Fourie, NWU Pukke
Back That Rocks:	Matthew Fortuin, NWU Pukke
Rookie of the year:	Chijindu Okonta, Emeris
Top Try Scorer:	Jack Benade (9 tries), UCT Ikey Tigers
Top Points Scorer:	Alex Vermeulen (82 points), UCT Ikey Tigers

== Young Guns ==
=== 2026 Young Guns Log ===
The final log for the 2026 Young Guns was:

Group A Teams
Pos	Team	P	W	D	L	TS	PD	BP	PTS
1	UFS Shimlas Young Guns	6	6	0	0	32	91	6	30
2	UJ Young Guns	6	4	0	2	29	39	5	21
3	Emeris Young Guns	6	2	0	4	30	-34	4	12
4	CUT Young Guns	6	0	0	6	26	-96	6	6

Group B Teams
Pos	Team	P	W	D	L	TS	PD	BP	PTS
1	UCT Trojans	6	4	0	2	38	149	8	24
2	UP Tuks Young Guns	6	4	0	2	29	-8	6	22
3	NWU Pukke Young Guns	6	4	0	2	28	-2	5	21
4	Maties Juniors	6	0	0	6	18	-139	5	5
*Legend: Pos = Position, Pl = Played, W = Won, D = Drawn, L = Lost, PF = Points for, PA = Points against, PD = Points difference, TF = Tries for, TA = Tries against, TB = Try bonus points, LB = Losing bonus points, Pts = Log points Points breakdown: *4 points for a win *2 points for a draw *1 bonus point for a loss by seven points or less *1 bonus point for scoring four or more tries in a match Qualification: The top two teams from each group qualified for the semifinals.

Results

The following matches were played in the 2026 Young Guns Varsity Cup tournament:

=== Round 1 ===
23 February 2026

UCT Trojans	24-28	UP Tuks Young Guns
	Report

23 February 2026

NWU Pukke Young Guns	33-26	Maties Juniors
	Report

23 February 2026

UJ Young Guns	42-17	Emeris Young Guns
	Report

23 February 2026

UFS Shimlas Young Guns	36-20	CUT Young Guns
	Report

=== Round 2 ===
2 March 2026

UP Tuks Young Guns	43-25	Maties Juniors
	Report

2 March 2026

NWU Pukke Young Guns	31-40	UCT Trojans
	Report

2 March 2026

UFS Shimlas Young Guns	37-15	UJ Young Guns
	Report

2 March 2026

Emeris Young Guns	50-26	CUT Young Guns
	Report

=== Round 3 ===
9 March 2026

UCT Trojans	62-00	Maties Juniors
	Report

9 March 2026

Emeris Young Guns	27-39	UFS Shimlas Young Guns
	Report

9 March 2026

UJ Young Guns	55-31	CUT Young Guns
	Report

9 March 2026

UP Tuks Young Guns	19-50	NWU Pukke Young Guns
	Report

=== Round 4 ===
16 March 2026

UP Tuks Young Guns	29-24	UCT Trojans
	Report

16 March 2026

Maties Juniors	17-34	NWU Pukke Young Guns
	Report

16 March 2026

Emeris Young Guns	26-36	UJ Young Guns
	Report

16 March 2026

CUT Young Guns	00-28	UFS Shimlas Young Guns
	Report

=== Round 5 ===
23 March 2026

UCT Trojans	54-00	NWU Pukke Young Guns
	Report

23 March 2026

Maties Juniors	38-40	UP Tuks Young Guns
	Report

23 March 2026

CUT Young Guns	54-55	Emeris Young Guns
	Report

23 March 2026

UJ Young Guns	30-31	UFS Shimlas Young Guns
	Report

=== Round 6 ===
30 March 2026

NWU Pukke Young Guns	45-39	UP Tuks Young Guns
	Report

30 March 2026

Maties Juniors	03-36	UCT Trojans
	Report

30 March 2026

CUT Young Guns	38-41	UJ Young Guns
	Report

30 March 2026

UFS Shimlas Young Guns	45-33	Emeris Young Guns
	Report

=== Play-offs ===
The playoffs for the 2026 Young Guns Varsity Tournament was as follows:

Semi-finals
6 April 2026
UCT Trojans	50
UJ Young Guns	31
6 April 2026
UFS Shimlas Young Guns	46
UP Tuks Young Guns	40

Final
13 April 2026
UFS Shimlas Young Guns	29
UCT Trojans	42

=== Semi finals ===
6 April 2026

UCT Trojans	50-31	UJ Young Guns
	Report

6 April 2026

UFS Shimlas Young Guns	46-40	UP Tuks Young Guns
	Report

=== Finals ===
13 April 2026

UFS Shimlas Young Guns	29-42	UCT Trojans
	Report
