= LITE Regal International School =

Coordinates: 51.5098781°N 0.1445844°W

Location
- Berkeley Square House, Berkeley Square; London, W1J 6BR; England

Information
- Type: Private college Summer school
- Established: 1993
- Founder: Milan Lebloch
- Sister school: Exam Papers Practice (founded in 2021)
- Headteacher: Milan Lebloch
- Gender: Coeducational
- Website: litecollege.co.uk

LITE Regal International School is a group of British independent colleges and summer schools, with branches in London and Cambridge, offering EFL(English as a Foreign Language) at all levels, GCSE and A-Level courses.

== History ==
The school was formed in its current structure in 1993 by Milan Lebloch. It opened in September 1993 with a mission to give a creative education with unrivalled pastoral care, inclusivity and breadth of experience for its pupils. The school teaches in small groups (fewer than 8 students per class) to provide individual attention to the students. LRIS also offers Easter Revision courses for GCSE, AS and A level students from other schools.

== Accreditation ==
LRIS London is a member of the British Accreditation Council (BAC) and is inspected by the Independent Schools Inspectorate (ISI).

== Curriculum ==
The majority of students take A level courses. A small cohort each year take GCSE/IGCSE courses. The specialist preparation course is also available to the LRIS students applying to the Russel Group Universities and to competitive degree specialisms. One-year university foundation programmes for students in engineering, law, business, computers, mathematics and science stream.

== Locations ==
The school is located at Berkeley Square in Berkeley Square House in London. The other branch is located at Bridge Street in Cambridge.
