= PMSA =

PMSA may stand for:

- Pakistan Maritime Security Agency (PMSA)
- Port Said Medical Students' Association
- Presbyterian and Methodist Schools Association
- Primary Metropolitan Statistical Area (see: United States metropolitan area)
- Project Management South Africa (PMSA)
- Provincial Medical and Surgical Association
- Proviso Mathematics and Science Academy
- Public Monuments and Sculpture Association
