= The Independent Institute of Education =

Higher education organization in Johannesburg, South Africa

- Company type: Subsidiary
- Industry: Education
- Founded: 2005; 21 years ago
- Headquarters: 54 Wierda Valley Road, Sandton, South Africa
- Area served: South Africa
- Key people: Dr Felicity Coughlan (Director); Peter Kriel (General Manager)
- Parent: ADvTECH Group
- Subsidiaries: Rosebank College; Emeris
- Website: www.iie.ac.za

The Independent Institute of Education (IIE) is a private higher education institution in South Africa and is a wholly owned subsidiary of investment holding company ADvTECH Group Limited. The IIE confers a range of tertiary qualifications, through various faculties, via a number of academic institutions in South Africa, including Emeris (a unification of Vega, Varsity College, HSM, and MSA) and Rosebank College.

== History ==
The Independent Institute of Education was founded in 2004 as the academic leadership and governance body within the ADvTECH Group. It is responsible for overseeing all of the Group's academic campuses, and developing, assessing, certifying, and overseeing the delivery of curricula at its campuses.

In June 2015, ADvTECH reported that The IIE had 31,000 tertiary students, 25,000 of whom are full-time, enrolled across 20 campuses in South Africa. The IIE continues to be the largest private educational services provider on the African continent, due to its corporate attachment to the parent company, ADvTECH Group.

In 2026, Varsity College, Vega, MSA, and HSM (School of Hospitality & Service Management) all merged to become Emeris. The new name is derived from ephemeris (celestial trajectory/direction) and emeritus (earned success/merit).

== Naming practice ==
The IIE brand follows a strict standard practice of putting the acronym IIE in front of the name/s of its educational institutions to distinguish them from the intellectual property accident of globally similar names. For example, IIE Rosebank, IIE MSA serve to distinguish these educational institutions from others either in South Africa or elsewhere globally. Monash University's campus in South Africa was acquired by the IIE and ceased to be Monash but MSA (with M for Monash, and SA for South Africa). By default, the IIE does not hold intellectual property rights to the Australian educational heritage name Monash - so MSA is always abbreviated, whether mentioned in text or voice, and never mentioned in full as a name. Secondly, South Africa's private higher education landscape has a history of being prone to 'fly by night' or fake colleges which attract students by riding on the brand names of historically trusted brands such as those owned and operated by the IIE, so this abbreviation preceding the actual name is used as a brand protection innovation for discerning student clients, accreditation agencies and industry peers to differentiate.

== Divisions and structure ==
The IIE oversees a number of academic institutions in South Africa, including:

Institution	Founded	Area of focus	Campuses
IIE MSA	2001	Social Science, Business, Information Technology, Public Health	Roodepoort
Vega School	1999	Marketing, Business administration, Branding, Design	Cape Town, Durban, Pretoria, Johannesburg
Varsity College (including The Business School at Varsity College)	1991	General	Cape Town, Durban (North and West), Pretoria, Johannesburg (Midrand and Sandton), Pietermaritzburg, Port Elizabeth
The Design School Southern Africa (now incorporated into Vega)	1990	Design	Durban, Pretoria, Johannesburg
Rosebank College	1948	General	Limpopo (Polokwane), KwaZulu-Natal (Durban, Pietermaritzburg), Gauteng (Braamfontein, Pretoria CBD, Pretoria Sunnyside), Free State (Bloemfontein), Eastern Cape (Port Elizabeth), Western Cape (Cape Town)

The IIE confers a broad range of qualifications, covering a variety of NQF levels, organized across its various faculties. The Institute also operates a number of workshops and short courses, and offers distance education for some of its qualifications.

Tuition for other institutions such as Unisa, UFS, and IMM has also been available on some IIE campuses, but this provision is now being phased out in line with regulatory requirements.

== Accreditation ==
The IIE is registered with the Department of Higher Education and Training as a private higher education provider, under the Higher Education Act, 1997. The IIE is also accredited by the British Accreditation Council.
