= Varsity College (South Africa) =

South African private higher education provider

The IIE's Varsity College
- Motto: Creative Thinking. Critical Thinking. #NewWorldThinking
- Type: Private
- Established: 1991
- Director: Louise Wiseman
- Location: South Africa
- Campus: 8 Campuses across South Africa
- Owner: ADvTECH Group
- Colours: Medium Blue, Light Green, and White
- Website: www.varsitycollege.co.za

The IIE's Varsity College is an educational brand of The Independent Institute of Education (The IIE). The IIE is the most accredited private higher education provider in SA and it is registered with the Department of Higher Education and Training. In 2026, it merged with MSA (formerly known as Monash), HSM, and Vega to form Emeris.

== Qualifications ==
Postgraduate and undergraduate IIE degrees, diplomas, higher certificates and short learning programs are offered at The IIE's Varsity College. Focus is placed on small lecture groups, interactive lectures, and modern technology in the educational space. Modes of delivery include full-time, part-time, and distance education.

== Campuses ==
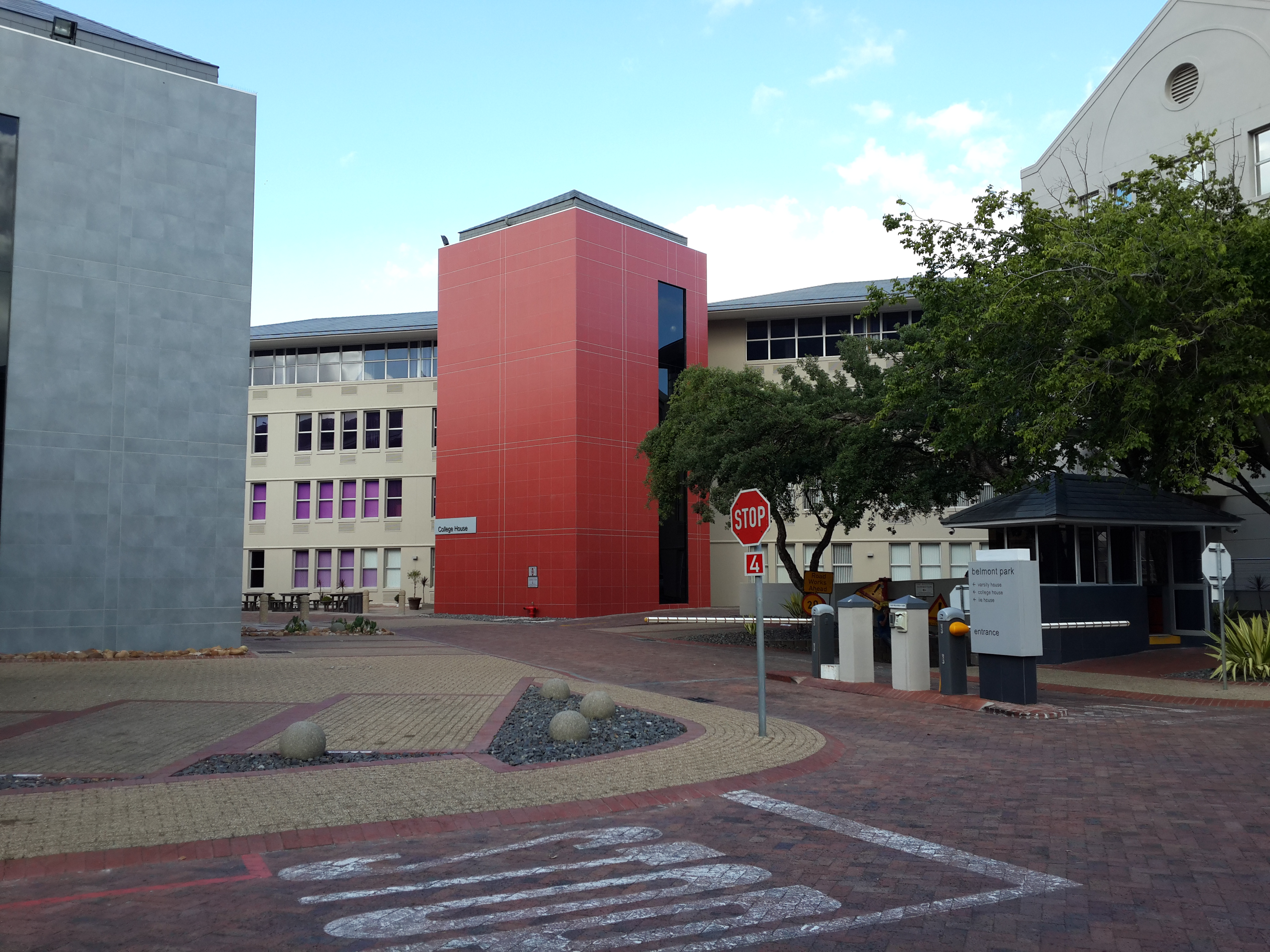
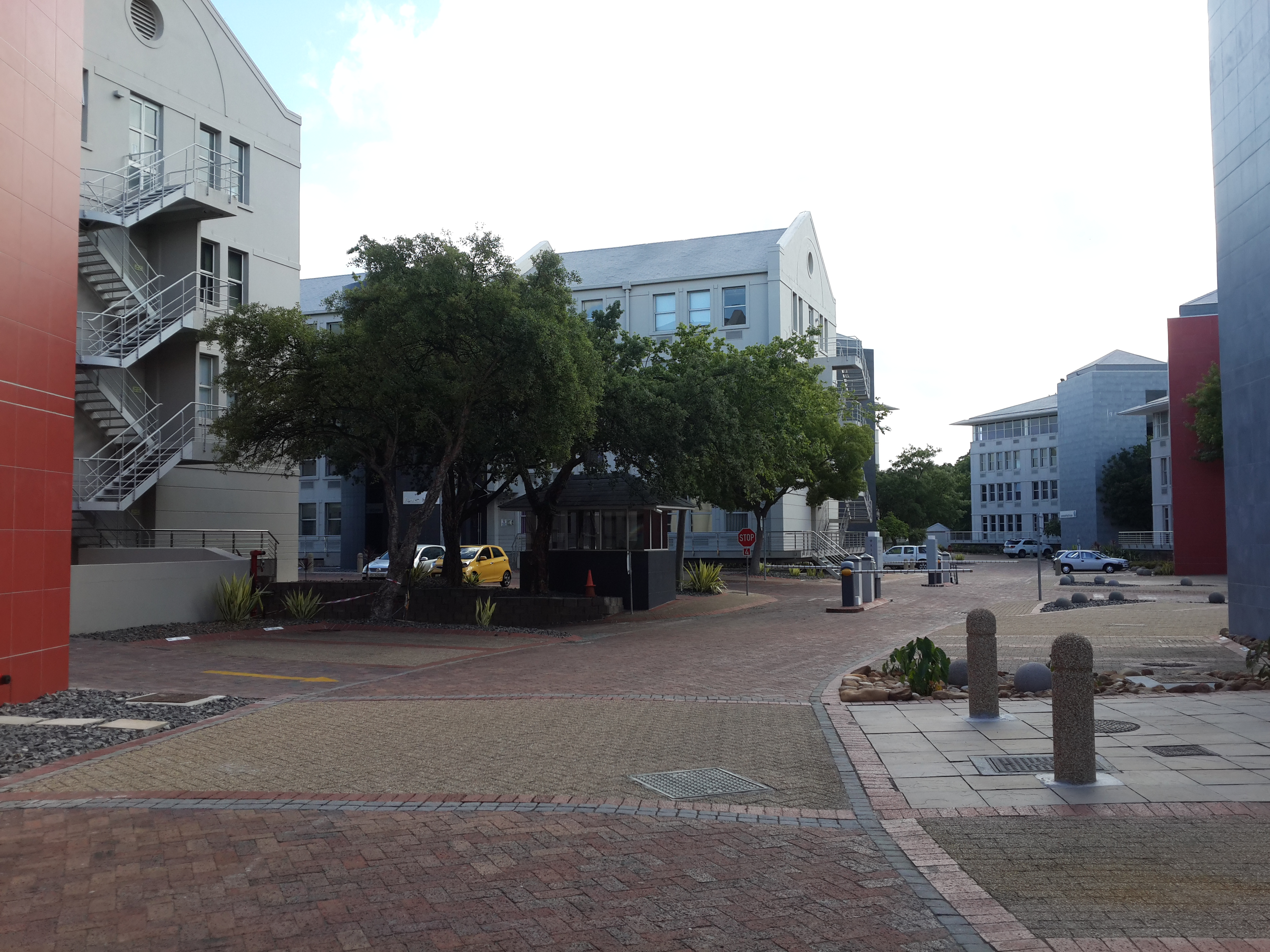
Buildings on the old Varsity College campus in Cape Town.

The IIE's Varsity College has eight campuses across South Africa, located in Cape Town, Durban (North and Westville), Pretoria, Waterfall-Midrand, Sandton, Pietermaritzburg, and Port Elizabeth.

== Organisation ==
The managing director of The IIE's Varsity College, Louise Wiseman, has the overall responsibility for the administration of the college. The academic departments of The IIE's Varsity College are divided into Schools of Excellence, each with its own head of school. Programmes are run by programme managers, at the campus level.

ADvTECH's academic leadership and governance system incorporates the AAC and Senate. The AAC, which includes external leaders in education and business, advises the ADvTECH Board, Senate, and IIE on academic matters. The Senate is responsible, either directly or through its committees, for the structure and curriculum of all programmes, teaching and learning, libraries, research, and student conduct.

== Student life ==
Learning goes beyond the lecture room with an offering that includes a variety of sports and social activities which vary between campuses.Varsity college also offers fun activities for students during meridian hour, where they can meet new people and join social committees

== Accreditation ==
The IIE is registered with the Department of Higher Education and Training as a private higher education provider, under the Higher Education Act, 1997. The IIE is also accredited by the British Accreditation Council.

== Associations and endorsements ==
The IIE has partnerships with and endorsements from a number of associations, including The Open University, Project Management South Africa (PMSA), and the South African Institute of Chartered Accountants (SAICA).
