= CITY College, University of York Europe Campus =

- Former names: CITY College, International Faculty of the University of Sheffield
- Motto: Greek: Καιρόν Γνώθι
- Motto in English: Know your opportunity
- Established: 1989
- Parent institution: University of York
- Location: Thessaloniki, Greece
- Campus: multiple sites
- Website: https://york.citycollege.eu

CITY College, University of York Europe Campus is an international institution, part of the University of York community, based in Thessaloniki, Greece with satellite activities in 7 countries.

== History ==
CITY College, University of York Europe Campus is an international institution based in Greece with satellite activities in 7 countries. Its first students enrolled in autumn 2021.

CITY College, University of York Europe Campus aims to embrace internationalisation while maintaining the same standards, curricula, and traditions of the British institution of the same name.

CITY's educational bases comprises students and faculty members from more than 60 countries, who speak over 20 languages.

== Organisation ==
Today CITY College consists of 4 academic departments:

- The Business Administration & Economics Department
- The Computer Science Department
- The Psychology Department
- The Humanities Department

== Courses offered in Thessaloniki ==
CITY College offers a variety of undergraduate and postgraduate courses in Thessaloniki.

=== Undergraduate studies ===
- BA (Hons) in Business Studies (Accounting and Finance)
- BA (Hons) in Business Studies (Management)
- BA (Hons) in Business Studies (Marketing)
- BA (Hons) in Business Studies (Hotel and Hospitality Management)
- BSc (Hons) in Computer Science
- BSc (Hons) in Computer Science (Artificial Intelligence and Data Science)
- BSc (Hons) in Computer Science (Business Informatics)
- BSc (Hons) in Computer Science (Web Technologies)
- BSc (Hons) in Psychology
- BA (Hons) in English Language, Linguistics and Literature

=== Postgraduate studies ===
- MSc in Business Analytics and Decision Sciences
- MA in Digital Marketing and Social Media
- MSc in Business Management and Technology
- MSc in Finance and Banking
- MSc in Finance and Risk Management
- MSc in management (General)
- MSc in management (Hotel and Tourism Management)
- MSc in management (Human Resource Management)
- MSc in management (Logistics and Supply Chain Management)
- MA in marketing, Advertising and Public Relations
- MSc in Neuromarketing
- MSc in Shipping, Port Management and Logistics
- MA in Clinical Neuropsychology
- MSc in Clinical Psychology
- MSc in Cognitive Neuropsychology
- MSc in Counselling & Psychotherapy
- MSc in Counselling Psychology
- MA in Counselling Psychology with a Practicum
- MSc in Artificial Intelligence and Data Science
- MSc in Software Development
- MSc in Software Development with Industry Placement
- MSc in Web and Mobile Development
- MA in Applied Linguistics with TESOL
- MA in International Relations and European Union Studies

=== Master of Business Administration (Executive MBA) ===
- MBA in General Management
- MBA in Marketing
- MBA in Finance
- MBA in Logistics and Supply Chain Management
- MBA in Healthcare Management
- MBA in Human Resource Management

=== Doctoral studies ===
- PhD studies can be pursued through the University of York Doctoral Programme supported by the South-East European Research Centre (SEERC).

== Courses offered in Southeastern Europe, Eastern Europe and the Caucasus region ==
Except for the programmes delivered at the main campus in Thessaloniki, Greece, CITY College offers a series of undergraduate and postgraduate programmes in other countries of Southeastern Europe, Eastern Europe and the Caucasus region.

=== Belgrade, Serbia ===
- Master of Business Administration (Executive MBA)

=== Sofia, Bulgaria ===
- BA in Business Studies (Accounting and Finance)
- BA in Business Studies (Management)
- BA in Business Studies (Marketing)
- BA in Business Studies (Hotel and Hospitality Management)
- BA in English Language and Professional Communication
- MA in Digital Marketing and Social Media
- MSc in Finance and Banking
- MA in marketing, Advertising & Public Relations
- MSc in Management of Business, Innovation and Technology
- MA in Clinical Neuropsychology
- MA in Cognitive Neuropsychology

=== Kyiv, Ukraine ===
- Master of Business Administration (Executive MBA)

=== Bucharest, Romania ===
- Master of Business Administration (Executive MBA)

=== Yerevan, Armenia ===
- Master of Business Administration (Executive MBA)

=== Baku, Azerbaijan ===
- Master of Business Administration (Executive MBA)

== Accreditation and recognition ==
CITY College University of York Europe Campus is accredited and recognised by a range of highly acclaimed professional international bodies and accrediting organizations:

- AMBA - Association of MBAs
- CMI - Chartered Management Institute
- BCS - British Computer Society
- BPS - British Psychological Society
- BAC - British Accreditation Council
- QAA - Quality Assurance Agency for Higher Education
