= Maties Women =

- Full name: Stellenbosch University Women's Rugby Union Team
- Nickname: "The Maroon Machines"
- Captain: (South Africa) Bianca Augustyn
- League: Women's Varsity Cup
- 2024: 2nd

The Stellenbosch University Women's Rugby union team, commonly known as Maties Women, is the women's rugby union club representing Stellenbosch University based in Stellenbosch, Western Cape who compete in the FNB Women's Varsity Cup.

== History ==
They won the inaugural FNB Women's Varsity Cup in 2023 defeating UJ Women 63–9 in the final.

In 2024, they were defeated by the UFH Baby Blues 37–31 in the final of the 2024 FNB Women's Varsity Cup.

They qualified for their third consecutive final after a 22–19 semi-final win over UJ Women.

== Honours ==
FNB Women's Varsity Cup: 2023 Runners-pp: 2024

== Records ==
Women's Varsity Cup record
Year	Round
2023	Champions
2024	Runners-up
2025	Champions
2026	6th
