= IIE MSA =

University in Johannesburg, South Africa

Coordinates: 26°05′00″S 27°52′37″E

- Former name: Monash South Africa
- Type: Private university
- Established: 2001
- Affiliations: Laureate International Universities, The Independent Institute of Education
- Administrative staff: 220 (80 academics)
- Students: 4,000
- Location: Ruimsig, Johannesburg, Gauteng, South Africa
- Colours: Red and black
- Website: www.iiemsa.co.za

The IIE MSA, formerly known as Monash South Africa, is a university located in Johannesburg, Gauteng, South Africa.

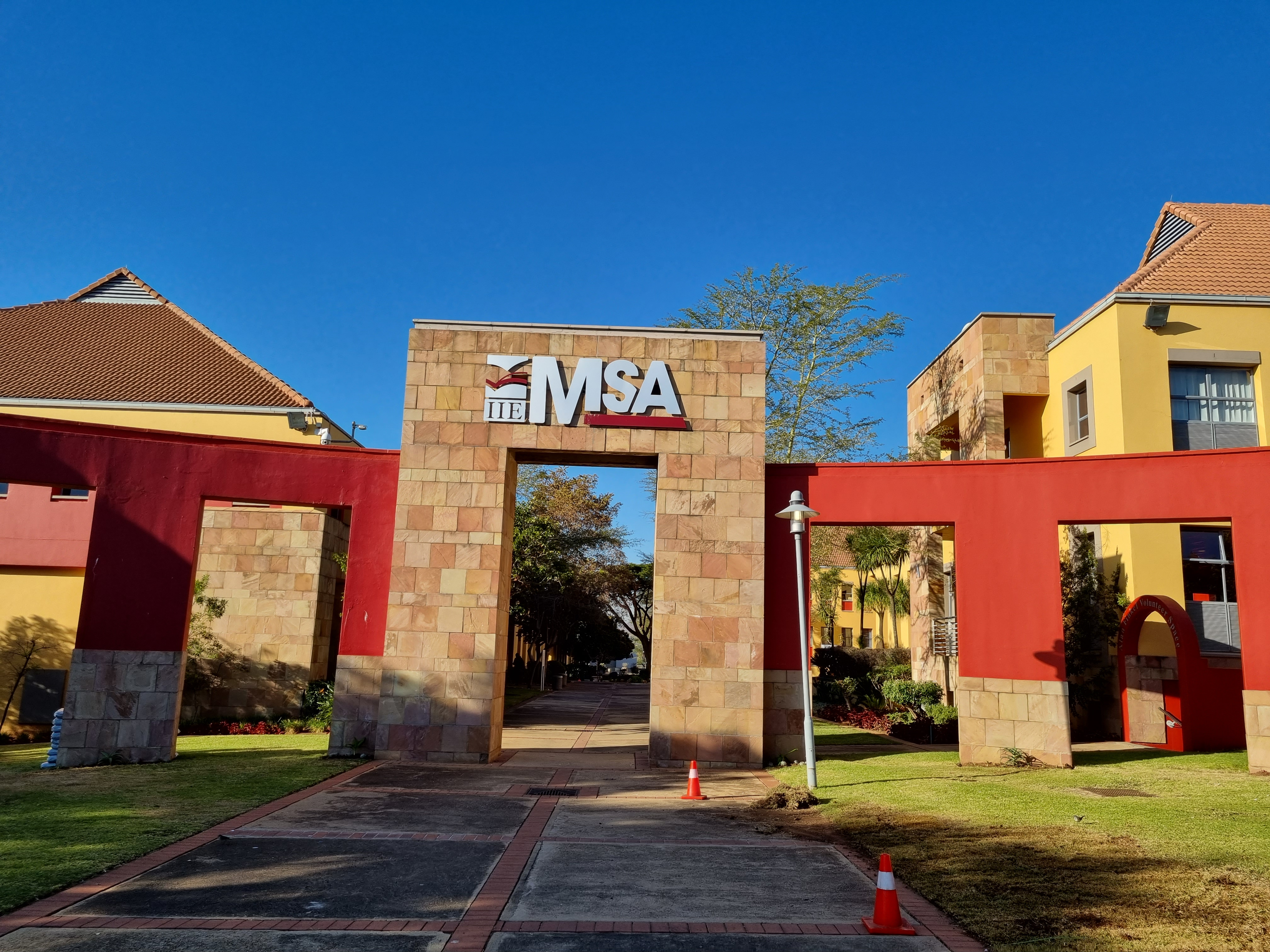
The IIE MSA campus.

== History ==
The IIE MSA was founded in 2001 as Monash South Africa by Monash University, an Australian university named after a civil engineer, John Monash.

The university was built on an agricultural land in Ruimsig, Roodeport. The first class intake at the IIE MSA was in geography and environmental sciences.

In 2019, it was renamed as IIE MSA after becoming part of The Independent Institute of Education.

In 2026, it merged with Varsity College, HSM, and Vega to form Emeris.

== Academia ==
The institution comprises two faculties, namely The Faculty of Business, Engineering, Technology, Mathematics and Statistics; and The Faculty of Social and Health Sciences.

The IIE MSA has produced celebrated academics in fields, such as engineering, medicine and actuarial science.

The IIE MSA offers undergraduate and postgraduate degrees, as well as short learning programs.
