= Abbotts Colleges =

Coordinates: 33.97571°S 18.47967°E

Abbotts College

Information
- Established: 1971
- Director: Horace Mpanza
- Grades: 8 - 12
- Education system: IEB
- Website: https://www.abbotts.co.za

Abbotts Colleges is part of the ADvTECH Group of private schools. Catering for students from Grade 8 – 12, Abbotts College High School guarantees academic success and excellence in a non-traditional but structured environment where individuality is valued.

The core philosophy of the College is a belief in the individual worth of each student. Abbotts College allows students to express this individuality in an environment where teachers and students alike strive for the best results

== History ==
The school was established in 1971 as a single campus in Observatory, Cape Town. It now operates five campuses in the Western Cape and Gauteng.
