= Women's Varsity Cup =

University rugby competition

- Current season or competition: 2026 Women's Varsity Cup
- Sport: Rugby union
- Instituted: 2023; 3 years ago
- Inaugural season: 2023
- Number of teams: 6
- Country: South Africa
- Holders: Maties Women
- Most titles: Maties Women (2 title)
- Website: www.varsitycup.co.za

Women's Varsity Cup, also known as FNB Varsity Cup Women, is a South African women's university rugby union competition. It is one of seven sports in the Varsity Sports series. The annual tournament involves the top women's rugby playing universities in the country, which belong to the University Sports Company. The tournament is managed by Advent Sport Entertainment and Media (ASEM) on behalf of the University Sports Company (USC), and is endorsed by University Sport South Africa.

== History ==
The inaugural tournament was held in 2023 with six universities taking part namely: Maties Women, UJ Women, UFH Baby Blues, Tuks Women, UKZN Women, and UWC Women. Maties Women won the first edition with a 63–9 win over UJ Women in the final.

In 2024 the UFH Baby Blues defeated the defending champions Maties Women 37–31 to win the title.

== Champions ==
A list of past champions and runners-ups.

Year	Champion	Runners-up
2023	Maties Women	UJ Women
2024	UFH Baby Blues	Maties Women
2025	Maties Women	TUK Women
2026	UFH Baby Blues	UWC Women

=== Team records ===
Team	Champions	Runners-up
Maties Women	2 (2023, 2025)	1 (2024)
UFH Baby Blues	2 (2024, 2026)	
UJ Women		1 (2023)
TUK Women		1 (2025)
UWC Women		1 (2026)
