= UJ Women =

- Full name: University of Johannesburg Women's Rugby Union Team
- Nickname(s): "Orange Army"
- Ground(s): UJ Stadium
- Director of Rugby: Tumi Leseke
- Coach(es): (South Africa) Bongiwe Nhleko
- Captain(s): (South Africa) Prescilla Sithole
- League(s): Women's Varsity Cup; Castle Lager Pirates Grand Challenge
- 2024: 5th

The University of Johannesburg Women's Rugby union team, commonly known as UJ Women, is the women's rugby union club representing the University of Johannesburg based in Auckland Park, Gauteng who compete in the FNB Women's Varsity Cup and the Castle Lager Pirates Grand Challenge.

== Rugby 15's ==
They were runners-up in the inaugural FNB Women's Varsity Cup after a 63-9 defeat to Maties Women.

UJ Women's Rugby 7s
- Full name: University of Johannesburg Women's Rugby Sevens Team
- Nickname(s): Orange Army Imbokodo
- Ground(s): UJ Stadium
- Director of Rugby: Tumi Leseke
- Coach(es): Mbuyiselo Siqebengu
- League(s): Women's Varsity 7's

The team plays also competes in the Castle Lager Pirates Grand Challenge.

== Rugby 7's ==
UJ Women's Rugby Sevens team, also UJ Women's 7s, is the rugby sevens club representing the University of Johannesburg based in Johannesburg, Gauteng.

They were crowned the 2022 Varsity Women’s 7s champions after defeating the University of Fort Hare 17-5 in the final.

== Technical team ==
The current coaching staff:

Position	Name
Head Coach	(South Africa) Bongiwe Nhleko
Head Coach 7's	(South Africa) Mbuyiselo Siqebengu
Conditioning Coach	(South Africa) Liphiwe Nxasana
Team Manager	(South Africa) Tumi Leseke

== Honours ==
- FNB Women's Varsity Cup: Runners-Up:2023
- Varsity Women's 7s: 2022
