= UFH Baby Blues =

- Full name: University of Fort Hare Women's Rugy Union Team
- Coach: (South Africa) Ntyatyambo Mkhafu
- Captain: (South Africa) Sivuyiseko Makhomazi
- League: Women's Varsity Cup
- 2026: 1st

The University of Fort Hare Women's Rugby union team, commonly known as the UFH Baby Blues, is the women's rugby union club representing the University of Fort Hare based in Alice, Eastern Cape. They compete in the FNB Women's Varsity Cup.

== History ==
In the inaugural Women's Varsity Cup season they lost 33-7 to eventual winners Maties Women in the semi-finals.

In 2024 they won their semi-final against Tuks Women 47–12 to reach the final. They defeated defending champions Maties Women 37–31 to be crowned 2024 FNB Women's Varsity Cup champions.

== Honours ==
- FNB Women's Varsity Cup: 2024

== Notable players ==
=== National team call up ===
Players who have received a Junior Springbok Women call up while playing for the university:

- Nolusindiso Booi
- Sindisiwe Mbonja
- Zintle Mpupha
- Unam Tose
- Lilitha Vakalisa
