= Cornwall Hill College =

- Cornwall Hill College school crest

Location
- Nellmapius Drive, Irene; Centurion, Gauteng 0062; South Africa; 25°52′24″S 28°14′02″E

Information
- School type: Private & Boarding
- Motto: Singuli Omnes (One and All)
- Religious affiliation: Christianity
- Established: 11 June 1998; 28 years ago
- Rector: Greg Theron
- Exam board: IEB
- Grades: 0000–12
- Gender: Boys & Girls
- Enrollment: 1 800 pupils
- Language: English
- Schedule: 07:40 - 14:00
- Campus: Urban Campus
- Campus type: Suburban
- Houses: Boarding Houses; Hill House (Boys); Tintagel House (Girls); Day Houses; Bodmin; Penzance; Camborne; Truro
- Colours: Blue; Red; White
- Mascot: Jerry
- School fees: R90,000 (boarding); R107,000 (tuition)
- Principals: College Principal: Keith Viljoen Prepatatory School Principal: Maurice Dicks
- Website: https://cornwall.co.za/

Cornwall Hill College is a private, boarding English medium co-educational preparatory and college in the suburb in Irene in Centurion in the Gauteng province of South Africa.

== Controversies ==
In June 2021, the school was accused of racism and discrimination in the form of comments made by staff members and negative attitudes shown towards students of colour. Parents and students accused the school of rejecting transformation calls after failing to follow through on promises of racial transformation at the school.

On January 30, 2026, Cornwall Hill College hosted the group JBM (Jaco Booyens Ministries) which sparked controversy amongst the parents due to the political nature of this presentation being directed to the students. This collaboration appalled many parents and students, due to controversial topic of politics and religion as well as mentioning the support of Donald Trump who is alleged in being included in the undertaking of the child abductions on Little Saint James island, Epstein Files. Many parents saw this as hypocritical due to the intended subject of preventing child trafficking, as well as criticizing the of South African Government.

== Notable alumni ==
Cornwall Hill College matriculants include:

- Brandon Stone (Class of 2011) South African professional golfer.
- Andrie Steyn (Class of 2015) South African professional cricketer.
- Onthatile Zulu (Class of 2018) South African professional hockey player
- Pieter Coetze (Class of 2022) South African professional swimmer
- Lhuan-dre Pretorius (Class of 2023) South African professional cricketer
