= 2025 Varsity Cup =

South African college rugby competition

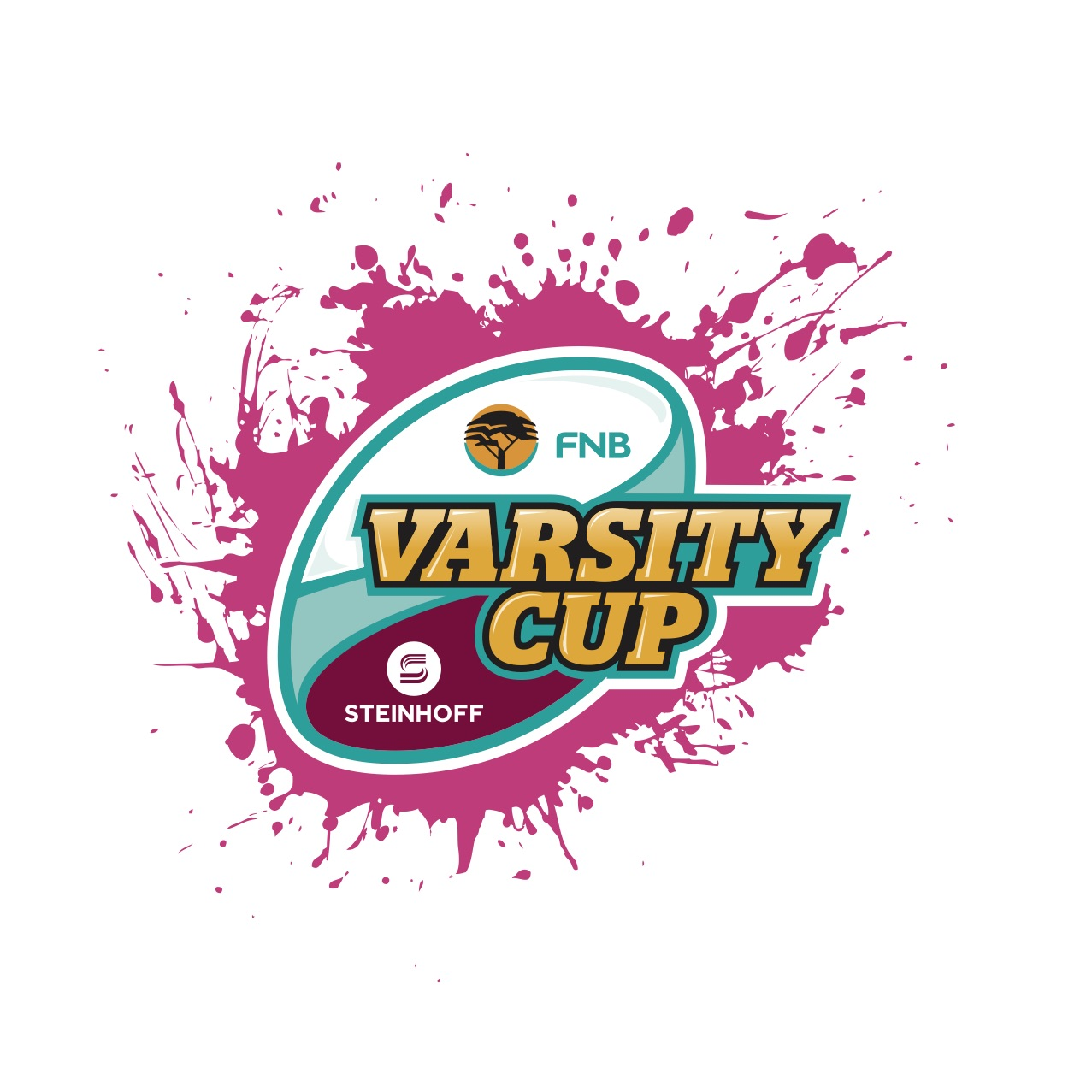
- Countries: South Africa
- Date: 17 February – 24 April 2025
- Champions: UCT Ikey Tigers (3rd title)
- Runners-up: Maties
- Promoted: Emeris (Varsity College)
- Relegated: Wits
- Matches played: 59
- Top point scorer: Ntokozo Makaza (118)

Official website
- varsitycup.co.za

The 2025 Varsity Cup was the 18th season of the Varsity Cup, the top competition in the annual Varsity Rugby series in men's rugby union. It was played between 17 February and 14 April 2025 and featured eight university teams.

One of the key storylines of the season was the UP Tuks resurgence, securing a place in the semifinals following a crucial 29‑19 victory over Stellenbosch's Maties in late March. In the championship match at the Danie Craven Stadium, Stellenbosch in Stellenbosch, the UCT Ikey Tigers captured the title with an emphatic 44‑21 win over MatMaties, claiming their third Varsity Cup crown. The final was played in front of a packed stadium, highlighting the continued growth in popularity of university rugby in South Africa.

== Competition rules and information ==
There were eight participating university teams in the 2025 Varsity Cup. They played each other once during the pool stage, either at home or away. Teams received four points for a win and two points for a draw. Bonus points were awarded to teams that scored four or more tries in a game, as well as to teams that lost a match by seven points or less. Teams were ranked by log points, then points difference (points scored less points conceded).

The top four teams after the pool stage qualified for the semifinals, which were followed by a final.

== Teams ==
Location of teams in the 2025 Varsity Cup
Western Cape

The teams that played in the 2025 Varsity Cup are:

2025 Varsity Cup teams
Team name	University	Stadium
NWU Eagles	North-West University	Fanie du Toit Sport Ground, Potchefstroom
Maties	Stellenbosch University	Danie Craven Stadium, Stellenbosch
UFS Shimlas	University of the Free State	Shimla Park, Bloemfontein
UCT Ikey Tigers	University of Cape Town	UCT Rugby Fields, Cape Town
Wits	University of the Witwatersrand	Wits Rugby Stadium, Johannesburg
UJ	University of Johannesburg	UJ Stadium, Johannesburg
CUT Ixias	Central University of Technology	CUT Stadium, Bloemfontein
UP Tuks	University of Pretoria	UP Tuks Stadium

== Standings ==
=== 2025 Varsity Cup Log ===
The final log for the 2025 Varsity Cup was:

2025 Varsity Cup log
Pos	Team	P	W	D	L	PF	PA	PD	TB	LB	Pts
1	Maties	7	6	0	1	248	131	+115	5	1	30
2	UP Tuks	7	5	0	2	254	183	+71	5	1	27
3	UCT Ikey Tigers	7	5	0	2	273	180	+93	4	2	26
4	UFS Shimlas	7	4	0	3	249	258	−9	4	2	22
5	NWU Eagles	7	4	0	3	324	161	+175	4	1	21
6	CUT Ixias	7	3	0	4	140	300	−170	2	1	11
7	UJ	7	1	0	6	164	265	−103	4	1	9
8	Wits	7	0	0	7	147	321	−172	1	2	5

Legend and competition rules
Legend:
Qualified for the semifinals.	P = Games played, W = Games won, D = Games drawn, L = Games lost, PF = Points for, PA = Points against, PD = Points difference, TF = Tries for, TA = Tries against, TB = Try bonus points, LB = Losing bonus points, Pts = Log points
Competition rules:
Qualification: The top four teams qualified for the semifinals. Points breakdown: * 4 points for a win * 2 points for a draw * 1 bonus point for a loss by seven points or less * 1 bonus point for scoring four or more tries in a match

=== Round-by-round ===
Team Progression – 2025 Varsity Cup
Team	R1	R2	R3	R4	R5	R6	R7	Semi	Final
UCT Ikey Tigers	4 (4th)	5 (4th)	10 (4th)	15 (3rd)	16 (3rd)	21 (3rd)	25 (2nd)	Won	Won
Maties	5 (3rd)	10 (2nd)	15 (1st)	20 (1st)	25 (1st)	25 (2nd)	30 (1st)	Won	Lost
UFS Shimlas	2 (5th)	7 (3rd)	12 (2nd)	12 (4th)	16 (4th)	17 (4th)	22 (4th)	Lost	—N/a
UP Tuks	5 (1st)	10 (1st)	12 (3rd)	17 (2nd)	21 (2nd)	26 (1st)	27 (2nd)	Lost	—N/a
UJ	0 (7th)	1 (7th)	3 (7th)	3 (7th)	8 (6th)	8 (7th)	9 (7th)	—N/a	—N/a
CUT Ixias	5 (2nd)	4 (5th)	4 (6th)	5 (6th)	6 (7th)	11 (6th)	11 (6th)	—N/a	—N/a
NWU Eagles	0 (6th)	1 (6th)	6 (5th)	11 (5th)	11 (5th)	16 (5th)	21 (5th)	—N/a	—N/a
Wits	0 (8th)	1 (8th)	2 (8th)	2 (8th)	3 (8th)	5 (8th)	5 (8th)	—N/a	—N/a
The table above shows a team's progression throughout the season. For each round, their cumulative points total is shown with the overall log position in brackets.
Key:	win	draw	loss						

== Pool stage ==
Matches

The following matches were played in the 2025 Varsity Cup:

=== Round one ===
17 February 2025	Maties	41–37	UFS Shimlas	Danie Craven Stadium, Stellenbosch
17:00		Report

17 February 2025	UJ	13–29	CUT Ixias	UJ Stadium, Johannesburg
17:00		Report

17 February 2025	Wits	8–35	UP Tuks	Wits Rugby Stadium, Johannesburg
17:00		Report

18 February 2025	UCT Ikey Tigers	32–23	NWU Eagles	UCT Rugby Fields, Cape Town
10:00		Report

=== Round two ===
24 February 2025	UP Tuks	37–29	UJ	LC de Villiers Stadium, Pretoria
14:45		Report

24 February 2025	CUT Stadium, Bloemfontein	23–19	UCT Ikey Tigers	CUT Stadium, Bloemfontein
17:00		Report

24 February 2025	NWU Eagles	27–29	Maties	Fanie du Toit Sport Ground, Potchefstroom
17:00		Report

24 February 2025	UFS Shimlas	59–29	Wits	Shimla Park, Bloemfontein
17:00		Report

=== Round three ===
3 March 2025	UFS Shimlas	49–45	UJ	Shimla Park, Bloemfontein
14:45		Report

3 March 2025	Maties	54–0	CUT Ixias	Danie Craven Stadium, Stellenbosch
17:00		Report

3 March 2025	UCT Ikey Tigers	36–29	UP Tuks	UCT Rugby Fields, Cape Town
17:00		Report

3 March 2025	Wits	34–39	NWU Eagles	Wits Rugby Stadium, Johannesburg
17:00		Report

=== Round four ===
10 March 2025	CUT Ixias	26–63	UP Tuks	CUT Stadium, Bloemfontein
14:45		Report

10 March 2025	NWU Eagles	59–14	UFS Shimlas	Fanie du Toit Sport Ground, Potchefstroom
17:00		Report

10 March 2025	UCT Ikey Tigers	73–17	Wits	UCT Rugby Fields, Cape Town
17:00		Report

10 March 2025	UJ	7–25	Maties	UJ Stadium, Johannesburg
17:00		Report

=== Round five ===
17 March 2025	Wits	24–32	UJ	Wits Rugby Stadium, Johannesburg
14:45		Report

17 March 2025	Maties	31–24	UCT Ikey Tigers	Danie Craven Stadium, Stellenbosch
17:00		Report

17 March 2025	UFS Shimlas	16–9	CUT Ixias	Shimla Park, Bloemfontein
17:00		Report

17 March 2025	UP Tuks	26–17	NWU Eagles	LC de Villiers Stadium, Pretoria
17:00		Report

=== Round six ===
24 March 2025	UCT Ikey Tigers	40–26	UFS Shimlas	UCT Rugby Fields, Cape Town
14:45		Report

24 March 2025	CUT Ixias	34–28	Wits	CUT Stadium, Bloemfontein
17:00		Report

24 March 2025	Maties	19–29	UP Tuks	Danie Craven Stadium, Stellenbosch
17:00		Report

24 March 2025	NWU Eagles	52–7	UJ	Fanie du Toit Sport Ground, Potchefstroom
17:00		Report

=== Round seven ===
31 March 2025	UJ	31–49	UCT Ikey Tigers	UJ Stadium, Johannesburg
14:45		Report

31 March 2025	NWU Eagles	107–19	CUT Ixias	Fanie du Toit Sport Ground, Potchefstroom
17:00		Report

31 March 2025	UP Tuks	35–48	UFS Shimlas	LC de Villiers Stadium, Pretoria
17:00		Report

31 March 2025
17:00

Wits	7–49	Maties
Try: Khosa	Report	Try: Erasmus (3); De Jager (2); Volmoer; Van der Merwe

Wits Rugby Stadium, Johannesburg
Player that Rocks - Carel van der Merwe, Maties

== Play-offs ==
Semi-finals
7 April 2025
UP Tuks	35
UCT Ikey Tigers	48
7 April 2025
Maties	19
UFS Shimlas	7

Final
14 April 2025
Maties	21
UCT Ikey Tigers	44

=== Semi-finals ===
7 April 2025
14:45

UP Tuks	35–48	UCT Ikey Tigers
Try: Nel 39'; Myeni 41'; February 64'; Louw 74'; Con: Burger 42', 75'; Pen: Burger (12 p), (20 p), (24 p); Cards: Manuel (yellow card) 28'	Report	Try: Nel 7', 43'; Burger 10'; Nyali 38'; Blanckenberg 56'; Con: Makhaza 7', 11', 39', 43', 57'; Pen: Makhaza (22 p), (26 p), (77 p); Cards: Dyonase (yellow card) 33'; Koevort (yellow card) 68'

LC de Villiers Stadium, Pretoria
FNB Player That Rocks - Keagan Blanckenberg, UCT Ikey Tigers

7 April 2025
17:00

Maties	19-07	UFS Shimlas
Try: De Jager 48'; Con: Van Heerden Smith 48'; Pen: Van Heerden Smith (2 p), (6 p), (12 p), (69 p); Cards: Lubbe (yellow card) 28'; Botha (yellow card) 29'; Makula (yellow card) 80'	Report	Try: penalty try 28'

Danie Craven Stadium, Stellenbosch
Referee: Hanru van Rooyen
FNB Player that Rocks - Carel Van Der Merwe, Maties

=== Final ===
14 April 2025
17:00

Maties	21–44	UCT Ikey Tigers
Try: Manuel 10'; Leotlela 66'; Con: Van Heerden Smith 67'; Pen: Van Heerden Smith (5 p), (27 p), (49 p)	Report	Try: Makhaza 2', 12'; Koevort 63'; Daars 74'; Con: Makhaza 3', 13', 64', 75'; Pen: Makhaza (55 p), (71 p), (77 p)

Danie Craven Stadium, Stellenbosch
Referee: Sean Muller

Maties	UCT

FB	15	Eldridge Jack
RW	14	Joel Leotlela
OC	13	Ryan Manuel
IC	12	CJ Marx
LW	11	Grant De Jager
FH	10	Christiaan van Heerden Smith
SH	9	Ezekiel Ngobeni (c)
N8	8	Ethan Snyman
OF	7	Luan Botha
BF	6	Fortune Mpofu
RL	5	Carel Van Der Merwe
LL	4	Zuko Poswa
TP	3	Herman Lubbe
HK	2	Armand Combrink
LP	1	Prince Mulea
Replacements:
HK	16	CJ Erasmus
PR	17	Janu Basson
PR	18	Jason Johnson
LK	19	Michael Chettoa
LF	20	Reuben Kruger
SH	21	Mckyle Volmoer
CE	22	Samuel Badenhorst
FB	23	Dylan Miller
Coach:
Kabamba Floors

FB	15	Duran Rayn Koevort
RW	14	Rethabile Louw
OC	13	Thomas Nel
IC	12	Luke Burger
LW	11	Ntokozo Makhaza
FH	10	Alex vermeulen
SH	9	Monray Daars
N8	8	Xola Nyali
OF	7	Connor Jack Gordon
BF	6	Siphomezo Dyonase (c)
RL	5	Danio Botha
LL	4	Enos Ndiao
TP	3	Zachary Porthen
HK	2	Keagan Blanckenberg
LP	1	Matthew Beckett
Replacements:
HK	16	J Lombard
PR	17	M Khuzwayo
PR	18	J Okonkwo
LK	19	K Mills
N8	20	A Da Costa
SH	21	J Miller
FH	22	K Davis
CE	23	A Norris
Coach:
Robbie Fleck

Player of the Match:
Keagan Blanckenberg UCT Ikey Tigers

Assistant referees:
Hanru van Rooyen (South Africa), Jonathan Lottering (South Africa)
Television match official:
Egon Seconds (South Africa)

== Honours ==
The honour roll for the 2025 Varsity Cup was as follows:

2025 Varsity Cup Honours
Champions:	UCT Ikey Tigers (3rd title)
Player That Rocks:	Ntokozo Makhaza, UCT Ikey Tigers
Forward That Rocks:	Carel van der Merwe, Maties
Back That Rocks:	Ntokozo Makhaza, UCT Ikey Tigers
Rookie of the year:	Alzeadon Felix, UJ
Top Points Scorer:	Ntokozo Makhaza, UCT Ikey Tigers (118)

== Young Guns ==
Results

The following matches were played in the 2025 Young Guns Varsity Cup tournament:

=== Round 1 ===
24 February 2025

Maties Juniors	12-11	Wits Young Guns

24 February 2025

UCT Trojans	52-12	CUT Young Guns

24 February 2025

NWU Pukke Young Guns	36-31	UP Tuks Young Guns

24 February 2025

UFS Shimlas Young Guns	55-31	UJ Young Guns

=== Round 2 ===
3 March 2025

UFS Shimlas Young Guns	94-20	CUT Young Guns

3 March 2025

NWU Pukke Young Guns	21-15	Wits Young Guns

3 March 2025

Maties Juniors	62-39	UP Tuks Young Guns

3 March 2025

UCT Trojans	26-11	UJ Young Guns

=== Round 3 ===
10 March 2025

UCT Trojans	48-43	UFS Shimlas Young Guns

10 March 2025

Wits Young Guns	33-29	UP Tuks Young Guns

10 March 2025

CUT Young Guns	31-55	UJ Young Guns

10 March 2025

NWU Pukke Young Guns	33-31	Maties Juniors

=== Round 4 ===
17 March 2025

Wits Young Guns	27-19	Maties Juniors

17 March 2025

UJ Young Guns	54-35	UFS Shimlas Young Guns

17 March 2025

CUT Young Guns	19-64	UCT Trojans

17 March 2025

UP Tuks Young Guns	31-26	NWU Pukke Young Guns

=== Round 5 ===
24 March 2025

CUT Young Guns	14-112	UFS Shimlas Young Guns

24 March 2025

NWU Pukke Young Guns	27-08	Wits Young Guns

24 March 2025

UP Tuks Young Guns	47-26	Maties Juniors

24 March 2025

UJ Young Guns	27-30	UCT Trojans

=== Round 6 ===
31 March 2025

Maties Juniors	21-24	NWU Pukke Young Guns

31 March 2025

UP Tuks Young Guns	26-52	Wits Young Guns

31 March 2025

UCT Trojans	29-33	UFS Shimlas Young Guns

31 March 2025

UJ Young Guns	41-38	CUT Young Guns

=== Semi finals ===
7 April 2025

UFS Shimlas Young Guns	26-29	Wits Young Guns

7 April 2025

UCT Trojans	47-46	NWU Pukke Young Guns

=== Finals ===
14 April 2025

UFS Shimlas Young Guns	18-03	UCT Trojans
