= Project Management South Africa =

- Founded: 1997
- Type: Professional Association
- Purpose: Project management
- Region served: South Africa
- Method: Industry standards, Conferences, Publications
- Members: 1500+
- Website: Official Website

PMSA is a not-for-profit professional association that is governed by a Board of Directors, and managed and administered by a National Office. Certain strategic activities are executed by a volunteer National Executive Committee. PMSA aims to advance professional project management in South Africa. It is distinct from the South African chapter of the Project Management Institute(PMI). It was formed as an independent National Association to represent project management professionals across all sectors in South Africa.

== History ==
Project Management South Africa (currently known as PMSA) was formed in 1997. PMSA was created to fulfill the need for a cross sector forum for practitioners to meet and work together and for a national body to work with local organisations and the South African government in developing effective project management within South Africa.

Due to imperatives for the formation of an autonomous local body, the PMI South Africa Chapter (chartered in 1981 PMI Chapters) encouraged the formation of PMSA in 1997 and committed to an ongoing working relationship between the two organisations.

PMSA has existed autonomously for more than fifteen years and has also maintained a co-operative agreement directly with PMI's USA-based global office, which encourages reciprocity in a number of areas consistent with the relationships PMI has with other autonomous bodies around the world.

== Membership ==
PMSA membership currently stands at more than 1500 members, who are drawn from a diverse cross section of industries and ethnic groups.
