= ADvTECH Group =

South African private tertiary education holding company

Advtech
- Type: Public
- Traded as: JSE: ADH
- ISIN: ZAE000031035
- Industry: Education; Recruitment
- Founded: 1978; 48 years ago
- Headquarters: Johannesburg, South Africa
- Area served: Africa
- Key people: Alexandra Watson (Chairperson); Geoff Whyte (CEO)
- Services: Tertiary education
- Revenue: ▲ R8.52 billion (2024)
- Operating income: ▲ R1.79 billion (2024)
- Net income: ▲ R1.10 billion (2024)
- Total assets: ▲ R10.77 billion (2024)
- Total equity: ▲ R6.17 billion (2024)
- Website: advtech.co.za

Advtech is a South African private tertiary education company, with operations across Africa. In late 2024, the company operated 8 universities and 110 colleges and schools. In the same year, the group reported 105,710 total enrolments, with roughly 60% of those being for tertiary-level qualifications.

== History ==
Advtech is Africa's largest private education provider and the holding company of the Independent Institute of Education which operates tertiary education brands including Emeris,, Rosebank College, Rosebank International University College, Capsicum Culinary Studio, and Waterfall School of Business.

The group operates a schools division with brands including Crawford International, Trinityhouse Schools, Abbotts Colleges, Pinnacle Colleges, Maragon Schools, Junior Colleges and Makini Schools.

The independent Centurus Colleges group which established three independent schools, including: Southdowns College in Centurion, Tyger Valley College in Pretoria and Pecanwood college in Hartbeespoort, was acquired by AdvTech on 16 September 2014 with a cash cost of R712 million. The three independent schools continued to run alongside the other educational brands run by AdvTech with each school retaining their individual characters.

In late 2017 the company discovered fraud by a financial manager in its schools division. That year, it began working on a new school in Nairobi, in the special economic zone Tatu City. In 2017, the company ran 90 schools in South Africa and Botswana across 47 campuses. It had 27,000 students enrolled under seven brands. It also owned nine tertiary education brands, and was listed on the Johannesburg Stock Exchange. Its CEO was Roy Douglas.

In 2018, it was expanding in Kenya and Uganda, purchasing a majority stake in the education group Scholé Ltd. Also in 2018, it acquired Monash South Africa (MSA) in Johannesburg. It had also recently acquired Capsicum Culinary Studio, The Private Hotel School and Oxbridge Academy. It acquired a 71% stake in the Makini Schools in 2018. By 2021, its stake was 94%.

The CEO of the AdvTtech Group in 2024 was Geoff Whyte. He succeeded Roy Douglas, who retired from the position as of February 2024. Chairman in 2024 was Chris Boulle. In 2014, Advtech bought 100% of Flipper International School in Addis Ababa, Ethiopia. The deal was for US$7.5 million. In April 2024, it was reported that Advtech would be expanding into health education, particularly nursing.

For AdvTech's strategic push and expansion of its footprint and growth of its corporate identity, in 2026 it was announced that the Southdowns College, Tyger Valley College and Pecanwood College schools originally founded by the Centurus Colleges educational group will each be transitioned into school brands already run by AdvTech. Southdowns College will join the Crawford International family and will be known as Crawford International Southdowns. Tyger Valley College will join the Trinityhouse family and will be known as Trinityhouse Tyger Valley. Pecanwood College will join the Pinnacle College family and be known as Pinnacle College Pecanwood. As well as Glenwood House in George being rebranded as Trinityhouse Glenwood and Greenwood Bay College in Plattenburg Bay being rebranded as Pinnacle College Greenwood. The Crawford International, Trinityhouse and Pinnacle College educational brands are already owned and operated under the Advtech Group so the transitions are to unify Advtech's administration and branding. These changes will begin effective 1 January 2027.
