= British Accreditation Council =

The British Accreditation Council (BAC), also known as The British Accreditation Council for Independent Further and Higher Education, is an educational accreditation agency recognised by the British Government for international students entering the United Kingdom on student visitor visas. The British Accreditation Council was established in 1984, making it the oldest national independent accrediting body for non-EFL independent further and higher education providers in the UK.

== Affiliations ==
The British Accreditation Council has been a member of Enqua since 2015, became a member of INQAAHE in 2006 and has a memorandum of agreement with the Quality Assurance Agency. The Chief Executive of the BAC is a member of the British Council’s Accreditation Scheme Advisory Committee. The British Accreditation Council is a stakeholder of the Federation of Awarding Bodies. It also a onto the European Quality Assurance Register for Higher Education (EQAR) since 2015.

== Charitable objectives ==
The charitable objectives of the organisation are:

- To improve and enhance the standards of independent further and higher educational institutions by the establishment of a system of accreditation of such institutions and bodies administering schemes for such institutions and by the provision of an advisory and consultancy service in the field of independent further and higher education;
- To define the eligibility of institutions and bodies to apply for such accreditation and to establish the criteria and standards to be observed by institutions and bodies applying for such accreditation;
- To arrange for inspection of institutions and bodies applying for such accreditation and to prescribe fees payable therefore;
- To act as the national accrediting authority for independent further and higher education.

== Research and development activities ==
As well as assisting law enforcement in cases of potential fraud, the British Accreditation Council has provided evidence on the private sector to the UK parliament. In 2008, the charity undertook a research project on private further and higher education in Kosovo, as requested by the British Council and the Kosovo Government. The findings of that project were published in a report in July 2008, which was fully endorsed by the Kosovo Government.

In 2012 the organisation was commissioned along with CFE by the Department for Business, Innovation and Skills to provide a comprehensive picture of provision by privately funded institutions operating in the UK higher education (HE) sector.

== Inspection and accreditation ==
The British Accreditation Council inspects and accredits around 250 organisations within the UK and overseas. An inspection of a private college assesses four main areas:

- Management, staffing and administration
- Teaching, learning and assessment
- Student welfare
- Premises and facilities.

As well as private colleges such as Hult International Business School, the charity inspects training providers such as Crown Agents. In October 2012, it announced that it would also inspect and accredit online colleges.

Non-UK institutions accredited by the organisation include, City College (international faculty of the University of Sheffield), AKMI Athens Metropolitan College, AKTO (Art & Design), American University of Culture & Education (AUCE), BCA (Business College Athens), HTMi, Hotel & Tourism Management Institute, IMI University Centre, Independent Science & Technology (IST) Studies, International University College, Sofia, Mediterranean College - Athens, Mediterranean College - Thessaloniki, New York College, Athens-SBS, New York College, Thessaloniki, Rushmore Business School, Texila American University (Zambia), University of New York in Prague and VUZF University. Until October 2012, colleges outside the UK were only eligible for BAC accreditation if they offered higher education courses and had a formal validation agreement or other link with a UK higher education institution, awarding body or BAC-accredited college. In October 2012, a new accreditation scheme was launched for certain overseas institutions that did not meet these criteria.

Inspection reports are considered by the Accreditation Committee, which includes representatives from the British Council and the Council of Validating Universities.
