= 2023 Liga Națională de Rugby season =

2023 Liga Națională de Rugby
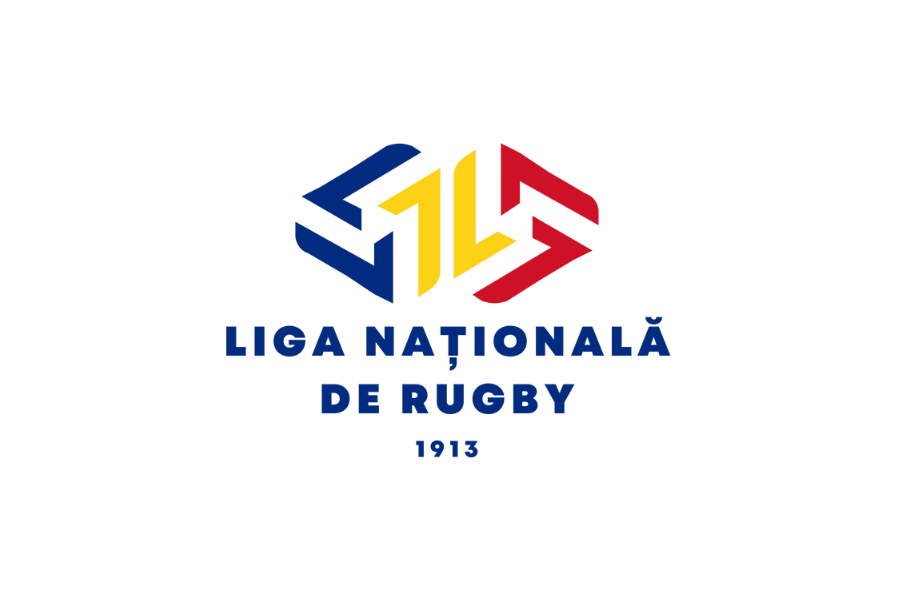
- Countries: Romania
- Date: 1 April 2023 – 9 December 2023

Official website
- rugbyromania.ro

The 2023 Liga Națională de Rugby is the 105th season of the top Romanian rugby union competition operated by the Romanian Rugby Federation. The season started on 31 March 2023 and was set to end on 9 December 2023, with its final to be disputed on the Arcul de Triumf National Stadium. Dinamo București won the title by defeating Știința Baia Mare 17–13.

== Teams ==
Fourteen clubs will compete in the 2023 Liga Națională de Rugby season, in three different groups.

Locations of teams in the 2022 Liga Națională de Rugby.

Team	Manager	Captain	Stadium	Capacity
Dinamo București	(New Zealand) Sosene Anesi	(Romania) Ovidiu Cojocaru	Stadionul Arcul de Triumf	8,207
Steaua București	(Romania) Stefan Acsinte	(Fiji) Eseria Vueti	Stadionul Steaua	31,254
Știința Baia Mare	(Romania) Eugen Apjok	(South Africa) Nicolaas Immelman	Arena Zimbrilor	2,300
Timișoara Rugby	(Romania) Valentin Calafeteanu	(Romania) Eugen Căpățână	Stadionul Gheorghe Rășcanu	1,000
CS Năvodari	(Romania) Virgil Năstase	(Romania) Onal Agiacai	Stadionul Flacăra	5,000
Universitatea Cluj-Napoca	(Romania) Cristian Săuan	(South Africa) Kuselo Moyake	Stadionul Iuliu Hațieganu	500
RC Grivița București	(Romania) Alexandru Marin	(Romania) Damian Ispas	Stadionul Arcul de Triumf	8,207
Știința Petroșani	(Romania) Emanuel Alexandru Lupu	(Romania) Alin Ghiarasim	Stadionul Știința	4,000
Politehnica Iași	(Romania) Cosmin Rațiu	(Romania) Sergiu Michiduță	Stadionul Tepro	1,000
CSM Galați	(Romania) Emanuel Alexandru Lupu	(Romania) Gabriel Dănăilă	Stadionul Nicolae Rainea	23,000
RC Bârlad	(Romania) Ioan Harnagea	(Romania) Constantin Cristaoan	Stadionul Rulmentul	2,000
CSM Suceava	(Romania) Mihai-Marcel Crețuleac	(Romania) Lucian Preutescu	Stadionul Areni	7,000
RC Gura Humorului	(Romania) Andrei Varvaroi	(Romania) Claudiu Cuciureanu	Stadionul Tineretului	2,000
CSM Constanța	(Romania) Radu Mocanu	(Romania) Mario Arvinte	Stadionul Callatis	5,000

== Fixtures & results ==
=== Phase 1 ===
==== Round 1 ====
31 March 2023
19:45

Steaua București	63–6	Universitatea Cluj-Napoca
	Report

Stadionul Steaua
Attendance: 400
Referee: Nicolae Fratila

1 April 2023
11:00

SCM Timișoara	22–3	Dinamo București
	Report

Stadionul Gheorghe Rășcanu
Attendance: 300
Referee: Cristian Serban

1 April 2023
11:00

Politehnica Iași	28–14	CSM Galați
	Report

Stadionul Tepro
Attendance: 200
Referee: Robert Diaconescu

1 April 2023
11:00

CS Năvodari	32–23	RC Grivița București
	Report

Stadionul Flacăra
Attendance: 300
Referee: Alexandru Ionescu

2 April 2023
12:00

RC Gura Humorului	32–15	CSM Suceava
	Report

Stadionul Tineretului
Attendance: 250
Referee: Vlad Iordachescu

3 June 2023
11:00

RC Bârlad	15-16	CSM Constanța
	Report

Stadionul Rulmentul
Attendance: 100

==== Round 2 ====
7 April 2023
13:00

Știința Baia Mare	14–20	Steaua București
	Report

Arena Zimbrilor
Attendance: 500
Referee: Robert Diaconescu

8 April 2023
11:00

Universitatea Cluj-Napoca	20–31	Dinamo București
	Report

Stadionul Iuliu Hatieganu
Attendance: 300
Referee: Vlad Iordăchescu

8 April 2023
11:00

RC Grivița București	5–18	Politehnica Iași
	Report

Parcul Copilului
Attendance: 100
Referee: Alexandru Nițulescu

8 April 2023
11:00

Știința Petroșani	24–12	CS Năvodari
	Report

Stadionul Știința
Attendance: 300
Referee: Radu Petrescu

8 April 2023
13:00

RC Bârlad	42–20	RC Gura Humorului
	Report

Stadionul Rulmentul
Attendance: 250
Referee: Alexandru Ionescu

10 June 2023
11:00

CSM Suceava	15-64	CSM Constanța
	Report

Stadionul Tineretului

==== Round 3 ====
13 April 2023
11:00

SCM Timișoara	47–10	Universitatea Cluj-Napoca
	Report

Stadionul Gheorghe Rășcanu
Attendance: 500
Referee: Andrei Gheorghe

13 April 2023
20:00

Dinamo București	31–17	Știința Baia Mare
	Report

Stadionul Arcul de Triumf
Attendance: 500
Referee: Alexandru Ionescu

22 April 2023
11:00

Politehnica Iași	19–18	Știința Petroșani
	Report

Tepro
Attendance: 200
Referee: Nicolae Fratila

22 April 2023
14:00

CSM Galați	14–10	RC Grivița București
	Report

Stadionul Municipal
Attendance: 200
Referee: Razvan Vasiliu

22 April 2023
13:00

CSM Suceava	18-66	RC Bârlad
	Report

Stadionul Unirea
Attendance: 250
Referee: Radu Petrescu

28 May 2023
11:00

RC Gura Humorului	9-28	CSM Constanța
	Report

Stadionul Tineretului
Attendance: 200
Referee: Vlad Iordachescu

==== Round 4 ====
21 April 2023
19:45

Steaua București	25–14	Dinamo București
	Report

Stadionul Steaua
Attendance: 500
Referee: Vlad Iordachescu

22 April 2023
11:00

SCM Timișoara	22-14	Știința Baia Mare
	Report

Stadionul Gheorghe Rășcanu
Attendance: 300
Referee: Cristian Serban

29 April 2023
11:00

CS Năvodari	5–18	Politehnica Iași
	Report

Stadionul Flacăra
Attendance: 300
Referee: Cristian Serban

29 April 2023
11:00

Știința Petroșani	24–12	CSM Galați
	Report

Stadionul Știința
Attendance: 300
Referee: Vlad Iordachescu

30 April 2023
13:00

CSM Suceava	3–55	RC Gura Humorului
	Report

Stadionul Rulmentul
Attendance: 250
Referee: Andrei Gheorghe

24 June 2023
11:00

CSM Constanța	34-24	RC Bârlad
	Report

Stadionul Callatis

==== Round 5 ====
28 April 2023
19:45

Steaua București	31–28	SCM Timișoara
	Report

Stadionul Steaua
Attendance: 500
Referee: Radu Petrescu

29 April 2023
15:00

Universitatea Cluj-Napoca	7–71	Știința Baia Mare
	Report

Iuliu Hatieganu
Attendance: 300
Referee: Robert Diaconescu

6 May 2023
11:00

RC Grivița București	24–20	Știința Petroșani
	Report

Parcul Copilului
Attendance: 150

6 May 2023
11:00

CSM Galați	28–19	CS Năvodari
	Report

Stadionul Municipal
Attendance: 200

6 May 2023
11:00

RC Gura Humorului	25-18	RC Bârlad
	Report

Stadionul Tineretului
Attendance: 250
Referee: Radu Petrescu

2 July 2023
11:00

CSM Constanța	78-8	CSM Suceava
	Report

Stadionul Callatis

==== Round 6 ====
5 May 2023
19:30

Dinamo București	20–17	SCM Timișoara
	Report

Stadionul Arcul de Triumf
Attendance: 600
Referee: Robert Diaconescu

6 May 2023
11:00

Universitatea Cluj-Napoca	23-45	Steaua București
	Report

Parcul Iuliu Hațieganu
Attendance: 300
Referee: Cristian Serban

13 May 2023
11:00

RC Grivița București	43–31	CS Năvodari
	Report

Stadionul Flacăra
Attendance: 300

13 May 2023
11:00

CSM Galați	11–17	Politehnica Iași
	Report

Stadionul Municipal
Attendance: 100

30 April 2023
13:00

RC Bârlad	72–18	CSM Suceava
	Report

Stadionul Rulmentul
Attendance: 150

24 June 2023
11:00

CSM Constanța	5-0 (forfait)	RC Gura Humorului
	Report

Stadionul Callatis
Attendance: n/a

==== Round 7 ====
12 May 2023
19:45

Steaua București	28–52	Știința Baia Mare
	Report

Stadionul Steaua
Attendance: 500
Referee: Nicolae Fratila

13 May 2023
11:00

Dinamo București	5-0 (forfait)	Universitatea Cluj-Napoca
	Report

Stadionul Arcul de Triumf
Attendance: n/a
Referee: n/a

20 May 2023
11:00

Politehnica Iași	25–10	RC Grivița București
	Report

Stadionul Tepro
Attendance: 200

20 May 2023
11:00

CS Năvodari	32–23	Știința Petroșani
	Report

Stadionul Flacăra
Attendance: 300

==== Round 8 ====
20 May 2023
11:00

Știința Baia Mare	36–27	Dinamo București
	Report

Arena Zimbrilor
Attendance: 600
Referee: Robert Diaconescu

20 May 2023
13:00

Universitatea Cluj-Napoca	20-55	SCM Timișoara
	Report

Parcul Iuliu Hațieganu
Attendance: 300
Referee: Vlad Iordachescu

27 May 2023
11:00

RC Grivița București	0–5 (forfait)	CSM Galați
	Report

Parcul Copilului

28 May 2023
11:00

Știința Petroșani	14–15	Politehnica Iași
	Report

Stadionul Municipal
Attendance: 300

==== Round 9 ====
26 May 2023
20:00

Dinamo București	29–25	Steaua București
	Report

Stadionul Arcul de Triumf
Attendance: 1000
Referee: Robert Diaconescu

27 May 2023
11:00

Știința Baia Mare	40-10	SCM Timișoara
	Report

Arena Zimbrilor
Attendance: 1000
Referee: Vlad Iordachescu

3 June 2023
11:00

Politehnica Iași	25–31	CS Năvodari
	Report

Stadionul Tepro
Attendance: 200
Referee: Andrei Gheorghe

3 June 2023
11:00

CSM Galați	11–48	Știința Petroșani
	Report

Stadionul Municipal
Attendance: 100
Referee: Alexandru Ionescu

==== Round 10 ====
3 June 2023
11:00

SCM Timișoara	27-20	Steaua București
	Report

Arena Zimbrilor
Attendance: 300
Referee: Robert Diaconescu

3 June 2023
13:30

Știința Baia Mare	56-25	Universitatea Cluj-Napoca
	Report

Parcul Iuliu Hațieganu
Attendance: 500
Referee: Vlad Iordachescu

10 June 2023
11:00

CS Năvodari	17-32	CSM Galați
	Report

Stadionul Flacăra
Attendance: 200

10 June 2023
11:00

Știința Petroșani	27-24	RC Grivița București
	Report

Stadionul Stiinta
Attendance: 200

=== Phase 2 ===
==== Round 1 ====
12 August 2023
11:00

Politehnica Iași	40–14	RC Gura Humorului
	Report

Stadionul Tepro
Attendance: 200

12 August 2023
11:00

Știința Petroșani	35-34	RC Bârlad
	Report

Stadionul Stiinta
Attendance: 200

12 August 2023
11:00

CSM Galați	10–43	CSM Constanța
	Report

Stadionul Municipal
Attendance: 100

12 August 2023
11:00

Universitatea Cluj-Napoca	82-17	CSM Suceava
	Report

Parcul Iuliu Hațieganu
Attendance: 100

12 August 2023
11:00

Dinamo București	66–16	CS Rapid București
	Report

Stadionul Florea Dumitrache
Attendance: 200

12 August 2023
14:00

CS Năvodari	31-14	RC Grivița București
	Report

Stadionul Flacăra
Attendance: 200

==== Round 2 ====
19 August 2023
11:00

RC Gura Humorului	58-5	Știința Petroșani
	Report

Stadionul Tineretului
Attendance: 200
Referee: Vlad Iordachescu

19 August 2023
11:00

Știința Baia Mare	68-3	Politehnica Iași
	Report

Arena Zimbrilor
Attendance: 200

19 August 2023
11:00

CSM Suceava	9-27	CSM Galați
	Report

Stadionul Municipal
Attendance: 100

19 August 2023
11:00

Steaua București	66-21	Universitatea Cluj-Napoca
	Report

Stadionul Ghencea
Attendance: 100

19 August 2023
11:00

SCM Timișoara	45–50	Dinamo București
	Report

Stadionul Gheorghe Rășcanu
Attendance: 300

19 August 2023
11:00

CS Rapid Bucuresti	52-25	CS Năvodari
	Report

Stadionul Olimpia
Attendance: 200

==== Round 3 ====
26 August 2023
13:30

CS Năvodari	0-92	SCM Timișoara
	Report

Stadionul Flacara
Attendance: 200

26 August 2023
11:30

Știința Petroșani	3-66	Știința Baia Mare
	Report

Stadionul Stiinta
Attendance: 200
Referee: Alexandru Ionescu

26 August 2023
11:00

CSM Galați	6–70	Steaua București
	Report

Stadionul Municipal
Attendance: 100

27 August 2023
11:00

CSM Constanța	120-3	CSM Suceava
	Report

Stadionul Flacara
Attendance: 100

26 August 2023
11:00

RC Grivița București	15-14	CS Rapid București
	Report

Parcul Copilului
Attendance: 200

==== Round 4 ====
2 September 2023
11:00

Steaua București	29-29	CSM Constanța
	Report

Stadionul Ghencea
Attendance: 250

2 September 2023
11:00

Știința Baia Mare	90-9	RC Bârlad
	Report

Arena Zimbrilor
Attendance: 200
Referee: Andrei Ballok

2 September 2023
11:30

Știința Petroșani	7-50	Politehnica Iași
	Report

Stadionul Stiinta
Attendance: 200
Referee: Alexandru Nitulescu

2 September 2023
11:00

Universitatea Cluj-Napoca	64-7	CSM Galați
	Report

Parcul Iuliu Hațieganu
Attendance: 100
Referee: Alexandru Ionescu

2 September 2023
11:00

SCM Timișoara	5-0 (forfait)	RC Grivița București
	Report

Stadionul Gheorghe Rășcanu
Attendance: 0

2 September 2023
11:00

Dinamo București	5–0 (forfait)	CS Năvodari
	Report

Stadionul Florea Dumitrache
Attendance: 0

==== Round 5 ====
16 September 2023
11:00

RC Bârlad	23-31	Politehnica Iași
	Report

Stadionul Rulmentul
Attendance: 200

16 September 2023
11:30

RC Gura Humorului	9-83	Știința Baia Mare
	Report

Stadionul Tineretului
Attendance: 200

16 September 2023
11:00

CSM Suceava	0–102	Steaua București
	Report

Stadionul Municipal
Attendance: 100

16 September 2023
11:00

CSM Constanța	13-49	Universitatea Cluj-Napoca
	Report

Stadionul Flacara
Attendance: 250

16 September 2023
11:00

RC Grivița București	3-84	Dinamo București
	Report

Parcul Copilului
Attendance: 200

==== Round 6 ====
23 September 2023
11:00

RC Gura Humorului	20-17	Politehnica Iași
	Report

Stadionul Tineretului
Attendance: 200

23 September 2023
11:00

RC Bârlad	27-12	Știința Petroșani
	Report

Stadionul Rulmentul
Attendance: 200

23 September 2023
09:45

CSM Constanța	56-17	CSM Galați
	Report

Stadionul Flacara
Attendance: 100

21 October 2023
11:00

CSM Suceava	7-68	Universitatea Cluj-Napoca
	Report

Stadionul Municipal
Attendance: 100

23 September 2023
11:00

RC Grivița București	28-31	CS Năvodari
	Report

Parcul Copilului
Attendance: 100

23 September 2023
11:00

CS Rapid Bucuresti	12-57	Dinamo București
	Report

Stadionul Olimpia
Attendance: 200

==== Round 7 ====
22 October 2023
11:00

Știința Petroșani	5-0 (forfait)	RC Gura Humorului
	Report

Stadionul Stiinta
Attendance: 0

29 September 2023
17:00

Politehnica Iași	3-85	Știința Baia Mare
	Report

Stadionul Tepro
Attendance: 200

29 September 2023
11:00

Universitatea Cluj-Napoca	28–39	Steaua București
	Report

Iuliu Hatieganu
Attendance: 250

29 September 2023
11:00

CSM Galați	5-0 (forfait)	CSM Suceava
	Report

Stadionul Municipal
Attendance: 0

30 September 2023
12:15

Dinamo București	23-20	SCM Timișoara
	Report

Stadionul Florea Dumitrache
Attendance: 200

30 September 2023
16:00

CS Năvodari	21-22	CS Rapid Bucuresti
	Report

Stadionul Flacara
Attendance: 200

==== Round 8 ====
7 October 2023
11:00

RC Gura Humorului	17-51	RC Bârlad
	Report

Stadionul Tineretului
Attendance: 200

7 October 2023
11:00

Știința Baia Mare	97-7	Știința Petroșani
	Report

Arena Zimbrilor
Attendance: 300

7 October 2023
14:00

Steaua București	77-3	CSM Galați
	Report

Stadionul Ghencea
Attendance: 200

7 October 2023
11:00

CSM Suceava	6-100	CSM Constanța
	Report

Stadionul Municipal
Attendance: 100

7 October 2023
11:00

SCM Timișoara	5-0 (forfait)	CS Năvodari
	Report

Parcul Copilului
Attendance: 0

==== Round 9 ====
1 October 2023
11:00

RC Bârlad	0-102	Știința Baia Mare
	Report

Stadionul Rulmentul
Attendance: 200

18 November 2023
11:00

Politehnica Iași	13-0	Știința Petroșani
	Report

Stadionul Tepro
Attendance: 200

18 November 2023
11:00

CS Năvodari	10-72	Dinamo București
	Report

Iuliu Hatieganu
Attendance: 250

18 November 2023
11:00

CSM Galați	10-31	Universitatea Cluj-Napoca
	Report

Stadionul Municipal
Attendance: 0

==== Round 10 ====
25 November 2023
11:00

Universitatea Cluj-Napoca	34-20	CSM Constanța
	Report

Iuliu Hatieganu
Attendance: 100

25 November 2023
11:00

Politehnica Iași	32-5	RC Bârlad
	Report

Stadionul Tepro
Attendance: 150

=== Finals ===
==== 5th place ====
9 December 2023
11:00

Universitatea Cluj-Napoca (5)	41-9	Politehnica Iași (6)
	Report

Iuliu Hatieganu
Attendance: 250
Referee: Alexandru Nitulescu

==== 3rd place ====
9 December 2023
11:00

Steaua București (4)	8-26	SCM Timișoara (3)
	Report

Stadionul Ghencea
Attendance: 300
Referee: Nicolae Fratila

==== 1st-2nd places ====
9 December 2023
13:00

Baia Mare (2)	13–17	(1) Dinamo
Try: Lămboiu 60'; Con: Popoaia (1/1) 61'; Pen: Popoaia (2/2) 20', 36'	Report	Try: Graure 75' c Pen: Williams (4/6) 7', 14', 56', 80'

Stadionul Arcul de Triumf, Bucharest
Attendance: 1,200
Referee: Cristian Serban

FB	15	(Romania) Paul Popoaia
RW	14	(Romania) Mihai Lămboiu
OC	13	(Fiji) Abele Atuinasa
IC	12	(Romania) Sione Fakaʻosilea
LW	11	(South Africa) Kefentse Mahlo
FH	10	(New Zealand) Nikau McGregor
SH	9	(Romania) Vlăduț Bocăneț
N8	8	(Georgia (country)) Beka Bitsadze
OF	7	(Romania) Nicolaas Immelman (c)
BF	6	(Romania) Alexandru Alexe
RL	5	(Romania) Ștefan Iancu
LL	4	(Georgia (country)) Mate Dardzulidze
TP	3	(Georgia (country)) Revazi Dugladze
HK	2	(Georgia (country)) Levan Papidze
LP	1	(South Africa) James Scott
Substitutions:
HK	16	(Romania) Robert Irimescu
PR	17	(Romania) Mihai Dico
PR	18	(Georgia (country)) Sandro Zubashvili
FL	19	(Georgia (country)) Nugzar Gelashvili
FH	20	(Romania) Alexandru Harasim
SH	21	(Romania) Alexandru Țiglă
CE	26	(Romania) Jason Tomane
LK	23	(Romania) Florian Roșu
Coach:
(Romania) Eugen Apjok

FB	15	(Namibia) TC Kisting
RW	14	(South Africa) Dylan Schwartz
OC	13	(Romania) Gabriel Pop
IC	12	(Romania) Mihai Graure
LW	11	(Samoa) Joe Perez
FH	10	(Romania) Tudor Boldor
SH	9	(South Africa) Jondré Williams
N8	8	(Romania) Cristi Chirică
OF	7	(South Africa) Keanan Murray
BF	6	(Romania) Kamil Sobota
RL	5	(Romania) Johan van Heerden
LL	4	(Romania) Marcel Rusu
TP	3	(South Africa) Jean Smith
HK	2	(Romania) Ovidiu Cojocaru (c)
LP	1	(Romania) Alexandru Gordaș
Substitutions:
HK	16	(Romania) Sergiu Puescu
PR	17	(Romania) Bogdan Neacșu
PR	18	(Romania) Dorin Tică
FL	19	(South Africa) Etienne Terblanche
WG	20	(South Africa) Damian Bonaparte
FL	21	(Romania) Eduard Cioroabă
LK	22	(Fiji) Sailasa Turagaluvu
FB	23	(Romania) Ovidiu Neagu
Coach:
(New Zealand) Sosene Anesi
