= 2022 Liga Națională de Rugby season =

104th season of the Romanian Rugby Federation's top rugby union competition

2022 Liga Națională de Rugby
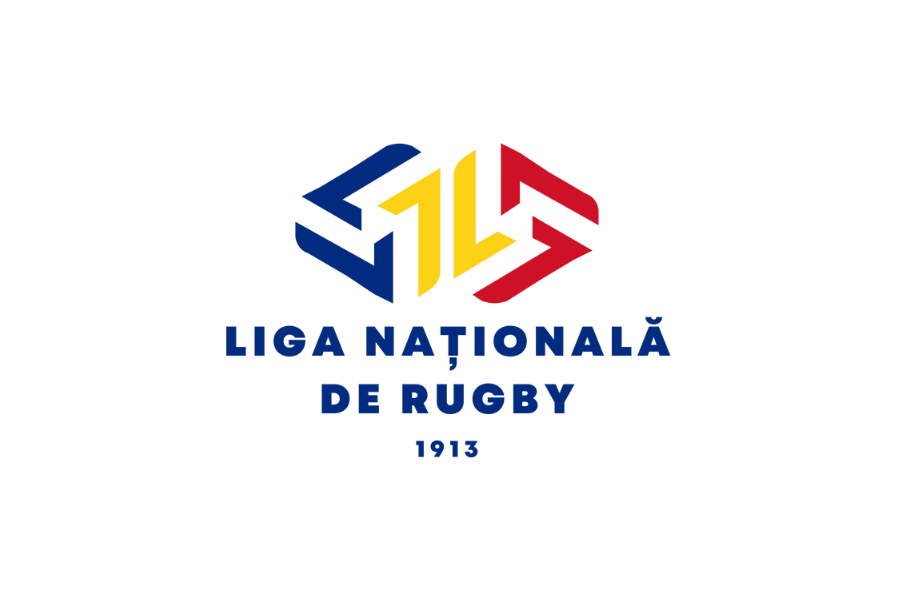
- Countries: Romania
- Date: 16 April 2022 – 4 December 2022
- Champions: Știința Baia Mare
- Runners-up: Steaua București

The 2022 Liga Națională de Rugby is the 104th season of the top Romanian rugby union competition operated by the Romanian Rugby Federation.

== Teams ==
Fourteen clubs will compete in the 2022 Liga Națională de Rugby season, nine of them joining the competition from the now defunct Divizia Națională de Seniori, formerly the second division of domestic Romanian rugby, while another five teams join the competition from the also defunct CEC Bank SuperLiga, formerly the first division of domestic Romanian rugby.

Locations of teams in the 2022 Liga Națională de Rugby.

| Team | Manager | Captain | Stadium | Capacity |
|---|---|---|---|---|
| Dinamo București | (New Zealand) Sosene Anesi | (Romania) Alexandru Mitu | Stadionul Arcul de Triumf | 8,207 |
| Steaua București | (Romania) Stefan Acsinte | (Fiji) Eseria Vueti | Stadionul Steaua | 31,254 |
| Știința Baia Mare | (Romania) Eugen Apjok | (Romania) Ovidiu Cojocaru | Arena Zimbrilor | 2,300 |
| Timișoara Rugby | (Romania) Valentin Calafeteanu | (Romania) Eugen Căpățână | Stadionul Gheorghe Rășcanu | 1,000 |
| CS Năvodari | (Romania) Virgil Năstase | (Romania) Onal Agiacai | Stadionul Flacăra | 5,000 |
| Universitatea Cluj-Napoca | (Romania) Cristian Săuan | (South Africa) Kuselo Moyake | Stadionul Iuliu Hațieganu | 500 |
| RC Grivița București | (Romania) Alexandru Marin | (Romania) Damian Ispas | Stadionul Arcul de Triumf | 8,207 |
| Știința Petroșani | (Romania) Emanuel Alexandru Lupu | (Romania) Alin Ghiarasim | Stadionul Știința | 4,000 |
| Politehnica Iași | (Romania) Cosmin Rațiu | (Romania) Sergiu Michiduță | Stadionul Tepro | 1,000 |
| CSM Galați | (Romania) Emanuel Alexandru Lupu | (Romania) Gabriel Dănăilă | Stadionul Nicolae Rainea | 23,000 |
| RC Bârlad | (Romania) Ioan Harnagea | (Romania) Constantin Cristaoan | Stadionul Rulmentul | 2,000 |
| CSM Suceava | (Romania) Mihai-Marcel Crețuleac | (Romania) Lucian Preutescu | Stadionul Areni | 7,000 |
| RC Gura Humorului | (Romania) Andrei Varvaroi | (Romania) Claudiu Cuciureanu | Stadionul Tineretului | 2,000 |
| CSU Alba Iulia | (Romania) Marius-Florin Ștefănescu | (Romania) Florin Mureșan Coge | Stadionul Cetate | 18,000 |

== Table ==
=== Group A ===
Key to colours
| Advances to play-offs |
| Advances to play-outs |

Regular Table
| | Club | Played | Won | Drawn | Lost | Points for | Points against | Points difference | Bonus points | Points |
| 1 | SCM Rugby Timișoara | 6 | 6 | 0 | 0 | 492 | 56 | +436 | 6 | 30 |
| 2 | Știința Baia Mare | 6 | 5 | 0 | 1 | 409 | 62 | +347 | 5 | 25 |
| 3 | Universitatea Cluj | 6 | 4 | 0 | 2 | 339 | 151 | +188 | 4 | 20 |
| 4 | Știința Petroșani | 6 | 3 | 0 | 3 | 231 | 193 | +38 | 3 | 15 |
| 5 | RC Gura Humorului | 6 | 2 | 0 | 4 | 74 | 325 | -251 | 0 | 8 |
| 6 | CSM Suceava | 6 | 1 | 0 | 5 | 68 | 221 | -467 | 1 | 5 |
| 7 | CSU Alba Iulia | 6 | 0 | 0 | 6 | 50 | 409 | -359 | 1 | 1 |

=== Group B ===
Key to colours
| Advances to play-offs |
| Advances to play-outs |

Regular Table
| | Club | Played | Won | Drawn | Lost | Points for | Points against | Points difference | Bonus points | Points |
| 1 | Steaua București | 6 | 5 | 1 | 0 | 501 | 57 | +444 | 5 | 27 |
| 2 | Dinamo București | 6 | 5 | 1 | 0 | 496 | 59 | +437 | 5 | 27 |
| 3 | CS Năvodari | 6 | 3 | 0 | 3 | 141 | 308 | -167 | 1 | 13 |
| 4 | RC Grivița București | 6 | 3 | 0 | 3 | 119 | 297 | -178 | 1 | 13 |
| 5 | Politehnica Iași | 6 | 2 | 0 | 4 | 114 | 198 | -84 | 3 | 11 |
| 6 | CSM Galați | 6 | 2 | 0 | 4 | 120 | -253 | -133 | 2 | 10 |
| 7 | RC Bârlad | 6 | 0 | 0 | 6 | 71 | -390 | -319 | 1 | 1 |

=== Playoffs ===
Key to colours
| Home semifinal |
| Away semifinal |

Playoff Table
| | Club | Played | Won | Drawn | Lost | Points for | Points against | Points difference | Bonus points | Points |
| 1 | Știința Baia Mare | 4 | 3 | 0 | 1 | 95 | 82 | +13 | 12 | 14 |
| 2 | Dinamo București | 4 | 3 | 0 | 1 | 86 | 71 | +15 | 12 | 13 |
| 3 | Steaua București | 4 | 1 | 0 | 3 | 91 | 82 | +9 | 4 | 8 |
| 4 | SCM Rugby Timișoara | 4 | 1 | 0 | 3 | 68 | 105 | -37 | 4 | 4 |

== Fixtures & results ==
=== Round 1 ===
16 April 2022
11:00

| SCM Timișoara | 96–6 | CSU Alba Iulia |
| | Report |

Stadionul Gheorghe Rășcanu
Attendance: 200

16 April 2022
11:00

| Universitatea Cluj-Napoca | 133–6 | CSM Suceava |
| | Report |

Iuliu Hatieganu
Attendance: 250
Referee: Vlad Iordăchescu

17 April 2022
11:00

| Știința Petroșani | 46–12 | RC Gura Humorului |
| | Report |

Stadionul Știința
Attendance: 200

16 April 2022
12:00

| CS Năvodari | 44–37 | RC Grivița București |
| | Report |

Stadionul Flacăra
Attendance: 350

16 April 2022
12:00

| RC Bârlad | 7–30 | CSM Galați |
| | Report |

Stadionul Rulmentul
Attendance: 250

17 April 2022
11:30

| Dinamo București | 62–0 | Politehnica Iași |
| | Report |

Stadionul Arcul de Triumf
Attendance: 200

=== Round 2 ===
30 April 2022
11:00

| CSU Alba Iulia | 0-88 | Universitatea Cluj-Napoca |
| | Report |

Stadionul Cetate
Attendance: 150

30 April 2022
13:30

| Știința Baia Mare | 13-31 | SCM Timișoara |
| | Report |

Arena Zimbrilor
Attendance: 800

30 April 2022
11:00

| Politehnica Iași | 17–20 | CS Năvodari |
| | Report |

Stadionul Tepro-Tineretului
Attendance: 200
Referee: Vlad Iordachescu

30 April 2022
12:00

| RC Grivița București | 22-20 | RC Bârlad |
| | Report |

Stadionul Arcul de Triumf
Attendance: 550

1 May 2022
18:00

| Steaua București | 23–23 | Dinamo București |
| | Report |

Stadionul Steaua
Attendance: 600
Referee: Radu Petrescu

1 May 2022
11:00

| CSM Suceava | 18–66 | Știința Petroșani |
| | Report |

Stadionul Unirea
Attendance: 200

=== Round 3 ===
22 April 2022
11:00

| RC Gura Humorului | 22–11 | CSM Suceava |
| | Report |

Stadionul Tineretului
Attendance: 200

7 May 2022
11:00

| Știința Petroșani | 76–14 | CSU Alba Iulia |
| | Report |

Stadionul Stiinta
Attendance: 400
Referee: David Popa

7 May 2022
11:00

| RC Bârlad | 7–52 | Politehnica Iași |
| | Report |

Stadionul Rulmentul
Attendance: 200
Referee: Alexandru Ionescu

7 May 2022
14:30

| CSM Galați | 12–27 | RC Grivița București |
| | Report |

Stadionul Municipal
Attendance: 200
Referee: Vlad Iordachescu

8 May 2022
12:00

| CS Năvodari | 7–30 | Steaua București |
| | Report |

Stadionul Flacara
Attendance: 400
Referee: Robert Diaconescu

8 May 2022
15:00

| Universitatea Cluj-Napoca | 13–35 | Știința Baia Mare |
| | Report |

Iuliu Hatieganu
Attendance: 300
Referee: Cristian Serban

=== Round 4 ===
14 May 2022
11:00

| Steaua București | 125–9 | RC Bârlad |
| | Report |

Stadionul Ghencea II
Attendance: 200
Referee: Madalin Girbau

14 May 2022
14:30

| Politehnica Iași | 26–23 | CSM Galați |
| | Report |

Stadionul Tepro-Tineretului
Attendance: 200

14 May 2022
11:00

| Știința Baia Mare | 54–15 | Știința Petroșani |
| | Report |

Arena Zimbrilor
Attendance: 400
Referee: Nicolae Fratila

14 May 2022
12:00

| Dinamo București | 95–12 | CS Năvodari |
| | Report |

Stadionul Arcul de Triumf
Attendance: 300
Referee: Vlad Iordachescu

15 May 2022
11:30

| SCM Rugby Timișoara | 80–17 | Universitatea Cluj |
| | Report |

Stadionul Gheorghe Rășcanu
Attendance: 300
Referee: Calin Cojocnean

29 May 2022
11:00

| CSU Alba Iulia | 33–14 | RC Gura Humorului |
| | Report |

Stadionul Cetate
Attendance: 200
Referee: Vlad Iordachescu

=== Round 5 ===
21 May 2022
11:00

| CSM Suceava | 33–14 | CSU Alba Iulia |
| | Report |

Stadionul Municipal
Attendance: 200
Referee: Vlad Iordachescu

21 May 2022
14:00

| Știința Petroșani | 14–62 | SCM Rugby Timișoara |
| | Report |

Stadionul Știința
Attendance: 300

21 May 2022
11:00

| CSM Galați | 3–74 | Steaua București |
| | Report |

Stadionul Municipal
Attendance: 200

21 May 2022
12:00

| RC Grivița București | 17–10 | Politehnica Iași |
| | Report |

Stadionul Arcul de Triumf
Attendance: 450

=== Round 6 ===
29 May 2022
11:00

| Știința Baia Mare | 95–0 | CSM Suceava |
| | Report |

Arena Zimbrilor
Attendance: 300
Referee: Florin Bonea

29 May 2022
17:00

| Universitatea Cluj | 33–14 | Știința Petroșani |
| | Report |

Iuliu Hatieganu
Attendance: 100
Referee: Robert Diaconescu

28 May 2022
11:00

| Steaua București | 113–10 | RC Grivița București |
| | Report |

Stadionul Ghencea II
Attendance: 150

28 May 2022
12:00

| Dinamo București | 97–12 | CSM Galați |
| | Report |

Stadionul Arcul de Triumf
Attendance: 250
Referee: Alexandru Nitulescu

28 May 2022
11:00

| CS Năvodari | 40–22 | RC Bârlad |
| | Report |

Stadionul Flacara
Attendance: 200

=== Round 7 ===
4 June 2022
11:00

| CSM Suceava | 0-137 | SCM Rugby Timișoara |
| | Report |

Stadionul Municipal
Attendance: 200
Referee: Romica Dumitriu

4 June 2022
12:00

| RC Gura Humorului | 16–55 | Universitatea Cluj |
| | Report |

Stadionul Tineretului
Attendance: 400
Referee: Mihai Vacaru

4 June 2022
11:00

| CSM Galați | 40–22 | CS Năvodari |
| | Report |

Stadionul Municipal
Attendance: 150
Referee: Alexandru Ionescu

4 June 2022
16:00

| CSU Alba Iulia | 3–98 | Știința Baia Mare |
| | Report |

Stadionul Cetate
Attendance: 200
Referee: Teodor Buzatu

4 June 2022
11:00

| Politehnica Iași | 9–69 | Steaua București |
| | Report |

Stadionul Tepro
Attendance: 300
Referee: Dragos Bargaoanu

4 June 2022
11:00

| RC Grivița București | 6–98 | Dinamo București |
| | Report |

Stadionul Arcul de Triumf
Attendance: 450
Referee: Alexandru Nitulescu

== Playoffs ==
=== Round 1 ===
13 August 2022
11:00

| SCM Rugby Timișoara | 21–15 | Dinamo București |
| | Report |

Stadionul Gheorghe Rascanu
Attendance: 300
Referee: Robert Diaconescu

13 August 2022
13:15

| Steaua București | 24–30 | Știința Baia Mare |
| | Report |

Stadionul Ghencea
Attendance: 400
Referee: Alexandru Ionescu

=== Round 2 ===
20 August 2022
11:00

| SCM Rugby Timișoara | 14–32 | Steaua București |
| | Report |

Stadionul Gheorghe Rascanu
Attendance: 300
Referee: Cristian Serban

20 August 2022
12:30

| Dinamo București | 23–17 | Știința Baia Mare |
| | Report |

Stadionul Dinamo
Attendance: 300
Referee: Vlad Iordachescu

=== Round 3 ===
26 August 2022
19:45

| Steaua București | 27–28 | Dinamo București |
| | Report |

Stadionul Steaua
Attendance: 1,100
Referee: Cristian Serban

27 August 2022
11:00

| Știința Baia Mare | 38–27 | SCM Rugby Timișoara |
| | Report |

Arena Zimbrilor
Attendance: 500
Referee: Radu Petrescu

=== Round 4 ===
3 September 2022
11:00

| Știința Baia Mare | 10-8 | Steaua București |
| | Report |

Arena Zimbrilor
Attendance: 1000

3 September 2022
12:45

| Dinamo București | 20-6 | SCM Rugby Timișoara |
| | Report |

Stadionul Dinamo
Attendance: 500

=== Round 5 ===
1 October 2022
11:00

| Știința Baia Mare | 18-16 | Dinamo București |
| | Report |

Arena Zimbrilor
Attendance: 800

1 October 2022
13:00

| Steaua București | 52-5 | SCM Rugby Timișoara |
| | Report |

Stadionul Steaua
Attendance: 1000

=== Round 6 ===
7 October 2022
18:15

| Steaua București | 22-23 | Dinamo București |
| | Report |

Arena Zimbrilor
Attendance: 1000

8 October 2022
11:00

| SCM Rugby Timișoara | 29-15 | Știința Baia Mare |
| | Report |

Stadionul Gheorghe Rascanu
Attendance: 500

== Finals ==
=== Semifinals ===
27 November 2022
11:00

| Știința Baia Mare | 12-9 | SCM Rugby Timișoara |
| | Report |

Arena Zimbrilor
Attendance: 1000
Referee: Vlad Iordachescu

27 November 2022
16:30

| Steaua București | 25-15 | Dinamo București |
| | Report |

Stadionul Arcul de Triumf
Attendance: 1200
Referee: Robert Diaconescu

=== 3rd place match ===
4 December 2022
11:30

| SCM Rugby Timișoara | 18-44 | Dinamo București |
| | Report |

Stadionul Arcul de Triumf
Attendance: 1000
Referee: Vlad Iordachescu

=== Final ===
4 December 2022
14:30

| Steaua București | 15–22 | Știința Baia Mare |
| | Report |

Stadionul Arcul de Triumf
Attendance: 1500
Referee: Alexandru Ionescu
