= Ștefan Iancu (rugby union) =

Romania rugby union player (born 1998)

- Full name: Ștefan Iancu
- Born: 1 July 1998 (age 28)
- Height: 205 cm (6 ft 9 in)
- Weight: 130 kg (287 lb; 20 st 7 lb)

Rugby union career
- Position: Lock
- Current team: CSM Știința Baia Mare, Romanian Wolves
Youth career
- RC Bârlad
Senior career
Years	Team	Apps	(Points)
2017-2019	CSM București	22	(0)
2019-2020	SCM Gloria Buzău	6	(0)
2020-2021	CSM Știința Baia Mare	4	(0)
2021-2022	Chinnor R.F.C.	??	(??)
2022-	CSM Știința Baia Mare	9	(5)
2022-	Romanian Wolves	2	(0)
- Correct as of 19 August 2023
International career
Years	Team	Apps	(Points)
2016	Romania under-18	??	(??)
2018	Romania under-20	??	(??)
2020	Romania under-23	??	(??)
2022-	Romania	5	(0)
2023	Romania A	1	(0)
- Correct as of 19 August 2023

Ștefan Iancu (born 1 July 1998) is a Romanian rugby union player who plays at CSM Știința Baia Mare in the Liga Națională de Rugby and for the Romanian Wolves in the Rugby Europe Super Cup.

== Club career ==
Iancu began his senior career at CSM București playing for 2 seasons before moving to SCM Gloria Buzău for a season then moving to Liga Națională de Rugby champions CSM Știința Baia Mare.

In 2021 he moved to English National One side Chinnor RFC spending a season in England before moving back to CSM Știința Baia Mare.

In 2022 he was named in the Romanian Wolves squad for the Rugby Europe Super Cup.

== International career ==
He played age grade rugby for Romania, including playing in the 2018 World Rugby Under 20 Trophy. He made his senior debut coming off the bench in a 22–30 win over Uruguay. Iancu was named in the Romanian squad for the 2023 Rugby World Cup.

He has also featured for the Romania A squad in a match against Italy A.

== Honors ==
=== CSM București ===
- Cupa României: 2017, 2018
- Cupa Regelui: 2017

=== CSM Știința Baia Mare ===
- Liga Națională de Rugby: 2021, 2022
- Cupa României: 2020
