= Alin Conache =

Romanian rugby union player

- Full name: Alin Conache
- Born: 7 May 2002 (age 24) Suceava, Romania
- Height: 170 cm (5 ft 7 in)
- Weight: 72 kg (159 lb; 11 st 5 lb)
- Notable relative(s): Vasile Conache (father); Tiberiu Conache (brother); Gabriel Conache (brother)

Rugby union career
- Position: Scrum-half
- Current team: SCM Rugby Timișoara, Romanian Wolves
Youth career
- 2009-2016: CSM Suceava
- 2016-2020: RC Gura Humorului
Senior career
Years	Team	Apps	(Points)
2020-2021	RC Gura Humorului	8	(0)
2021-	SCM Rugby Timișoara	47	(200)
2022-	Romanian Wolves	4	(16)
- Correct as of 17 July 2024
International career
Years	Team	Apps	(Points)
2023-	Romania	16	(38)
- Correct as of 17 July 2024

Alin Conache (born 7 May 2002) is a Romanian rugby union player who plays for SCM Rugby Timișoara in the Liga Națională de Rugby and for the Romanian Wolves in the Rugby Europe Super Cup.

== Club career ==
=== CSM Suceva ===
Concache began playing rugby at CSM Suceva where his father coached at the time.

=== RC Gura Humorului ===
In 2016 he joined RC Gura Humorului where he won three national champion titles at Under 15, Under 16 and Under 17 levels. He made his debut for the senior side in 2020 making 8 appearances before being signed by Liga Națională de Rugby side SCM Rugby Timișoara. French side USA Perpignan offered him a contract after he had a three-week trial there however he declined.

=== SCM Rugby Timișoara ===
Concache made 11 appearances in his first season, debuting against his former club RC Gura Humorului. In the next season he went on the score 39 points in only 9 appearances.

=== Romanian Wolves ===
In 2022 he joined the Romanian Wolves squad for their inaugural Rugby Europe Super Cup season.

== International career ==
He made his debut for the Romania national team in the first round of the 2023 Rugby Europe Championship, coming off the bench in their win over Poland. He was named in the squad for the 2023 Rugby World Cup.
