= AFC Săgeata Năvodari =

Romanian football club

Săgeata Năvodari
- Full name: AFC Săgeata Năvodari
- Founded: 2010
- Dissolved: 2015
- Ground: Flacăra
- Capacity: 5,000
- 2014–15: Liga II, Seria I, 12th (relegated)
- Website: www.sageata-navodari.ro
Home colours	Away colours

Săgeata Năvodari was a Romanian professional football club from Năvodari, Constanța County, Romania, founded in 2010 and dissolved in 2015.

== History ==
At the end of July 2010 the investors of AS Săgeata Stejaru decided to leave Stejaru and founded a new club in Năvodari, named AFC Săgeata Năvodari. Thus continuing the football tradition in Năvodari after the dissolution of CS Năvodari, former Midia Năvodari.

Săgeata finished 2nd in the series the first half of the 2010–11 Liga II season, and was in the battle for the promotion with Ceahlăul Piatra Neamț and Concordia Chiajna. By the end of the season Săgeata targeted the first two places but failed to reach them and finished the championship 3rd. But all was not lost, because FRF decided that a play-off round will be played between Voința Sibiu and Săgeata Năvodari for the last vacant place in the 2011–12 Liga I.

Săgeata lost the play-off round against Voința Sibiu with aggregate score of 0–2.

Săgeata started fairly well the 2011–12 Liga II, ranking 3rd in the table after 11 rounds, just 4 points behind 2nd placed FC Delta Tulcea. The battle for promotion was fierce, with FC Viitorul Constanţa and FC Delta Tulcea as opponents. In the end CSMS Iaşi won the series, Săgeata ranking 4th, 12 points behind 2nd placed FC Viitorul Constanţa.

The objective for the 2012–13 season is once again the promotion to the Liga I, this time the main opponents being CS Otopeni, Sportul Studențesc București and Delta Tulcea.

The team finally promoted to the Liga I in 2013, after it finished 2nd in the series, 7 points behind FC Botoșani.

The objective for the 2013–14 Liga I season was to avoid relegation, but the club failed to achieve it. It started in the season in the Liga II, but during the winter break, it went bankrupt and was dissolved.

== Stadium ==
In the Liga II Săgeata played its home matches on the Petromidia Stadium, but after the promotion to the Liga I it had to move to nearby Farul Stadium, because its own stadium did not met the Liga I requirements.

== Honours ==
- Liga II
  - Runners-up (1): 2012–13

== Former managers ==
- (Romania) Constantin Gache (14 July 2011 – 11 April 2012)
- (Romania) Constantin Funda (interim) (11 April 2012 – 20 April 2012)
- (Romania) Aurel Șunda (20 April 2012 – 23 January 2013)
- (Romania) Constantin Gache (25 January 2013 – 25 April 2013)
- (Romania) Mihai Guliu (interim) (25 April 2013 – 17 June 2013)
- (Romania) Tibor Selymes (17 June 2013 – 10 December 2013)
- (Romania) Gheorghe Butoiu (interim) (10 December 2013 – 20 December 2013)
- (Romania) Cătălin Anghel (20 December 2013 – 2014)
