= CSM Constanța (rugby union) =

Romanian rugby union team

- Full name: CSM Constanța
- Founded: 2021; 5 years ago
- Location: Constanța, Romania
- President: Constantin Gheară
- Coach: Radu Mocanu
- League: Liga Națională de Rugby

Official website
- www.csmconstanta.ro/echipe/rugby/

CSM Constanța is a rugby union team based in Constanța, Romania. It was funded in 2021 and is set to debut in the 2023 season of the top Romanian competition, Liga Națională de Rugby. The team succeeds RCJ Farul Constanța, one of the most successful Romanian rugby union teams, and is currently managed by Constantin Gheară.

== History ==
CSM Constanța made its debut in the Liga Națională de Rugby on 27 May 2023, with an away match victory against RC Gura Humorului, the final score being 9-28.

In the same 2023 season, CSM Constanța won the national U20 championship, defeating Dinamo by 32-20.

== Current squad ==
CSM Constanța Liga Națională de Rugby squad
**Props**: (Romania) Alexandru Popa Petre; (Romania) Hristu Puiu; (Romania) Alexandru Calin; (Romania) George Motrea; (Romania) Valentin Mihai Popa; (Romania) Gabriel Potirniche; **Hookers**: (Romania) Marian Bodonir; (Romania) Valentin Spiridon; **Locks**: (Romania) Nicolaie Ursu; (Romania) Stefan Motrea; (Romania) Ionut Ispilat	**Back row**: (Romania) Vasile Plotuna; (Romania) Nicolae Naziru; (Romania) Cristian Stoian; (Romania) Daniel Chirica; (Romania) Mario Arvinte (c); (Romania) Sebastian Sîrbu; **Scrum-halves**: (Romania) Alexandru Sava; (Romania) Marian Sandu; **Fly-halves**: (Romania) Ionut Sava	**Centres**: (Romania) Cristian Bumbac; (Romania) Emanuel Sandu; (Romania) Alexandru Neagu; **Wings**: (Romania) Alin Luca; (Romania) Razvan Calin; (Romania) Iulian Manole; **Fullbacks**: (Romania) Marian Muntianu
(c) denotes the team captain, **Bold** denotes internationally capped players.^{*} denotes players qualified to play for Romania on residency or dual nationality.
