= CS Năvodari =

Romanian football club

- Full name: Clubul Sportiv Năvodari
- Nicknames: Pescarii (The Fishermen)
- Short name: Năvodari
- Founded: 1993; 33 years ago as Midia Năvodari; 2015; 11 years ago as CS Năvodari
- Ground: Flacăra
- Capacity: 5,000
- Owner: Năvodari Town
- Chairman: Gavrilă Stoian
- Manager: Constantin Funda
- League: Liga IV
- 2025–26: Liga IV, Constanța, 4th of 16
- Website: www.clubsportivnavodari.ro
Home colours	Away colours

Clubul Sportiv Năvodari, commonly known as CS Năvodari, or simply as Năvodari, is a Romanian amateur football club based in Năvodari, Constanța County founded in 1993 under the name of Midia Năvodari and re-founded in 2015 in its current version.

The club did not achieve much in its short existence, but was a solid club, playing in the Liga II for almost a decade, being involved in the promotion battle almost every season. Its best standing was runner-up at the end of the 1999–2000 Divizia B and the 2004–05 Divizia B.

== History ==
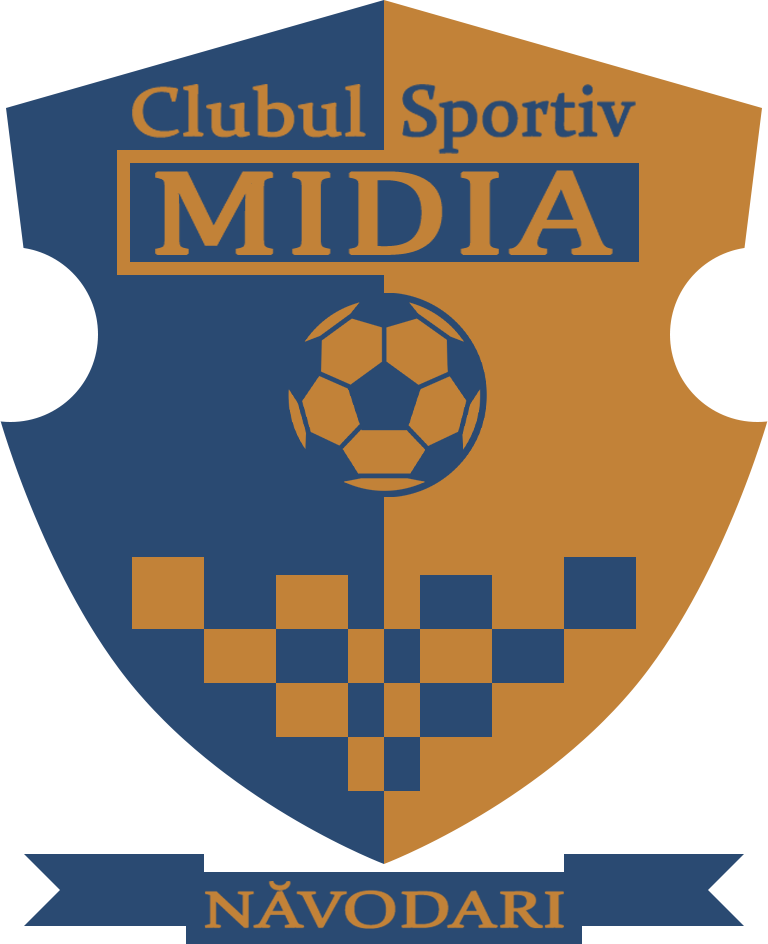
Former logo, as Midia Năvodari.

The club was originally founded in 1993, under the name of Midia Năvodari.

In the summer of 1995, the club bought the place of Petrochimistul CFR Constanța in Divizia C and finished 3rd in the 1995–96 season.

Midia Năvodari promoted to Divizia B at the end of the 1996–97 season, winning the second series of Divizia C four points ahead of Cimentul Fieni.

Until its contract expiration in April 2003 the head coach of the team was Leonida Nedelcu and later on in 2003 it was Ionel Melenco. The withdrawal of the club's main sponsor Petromidia, led to its dissolution in 2008.

In the summer of 2010 the city had once again a team in the Liga II after Săgeata Stejaru moved to Năvodari and was renamed Săgeata Năvodari.

In the summer of 2015, after the dissolution of Săgeata Năvodari, CS Năvodari re-founded the football department.

== Honours ==
Liga II

- Runners-up (2): 1999–00, 2004–05

Liga III

- Winners (1): 1996–97

Liga IV – Constanța County

- Runners-up (1): 2019–20

Liga V – Constanța County

- Winners (1): 2015–16

== Notable former players ==
The footballers mentioned below have played at least 1 season for CS Năvodari and also played in Liga I for another team.

- (Romania) Ionuț Dragomir
- (Romania) Costel Lazăr
- (Romania) Gheorghe Leahu
- (Romania) Florin Lungu
- (Romania) Bogdan Miron
- (Romania) Norbert Niță
- (Romania) Iulian Ștefan
- (Romania) Eusebiu Tudor
- (Romania) Răzvan Țârlea
- (Romania) Dorel Zaharia

== Former managers ==
- (Romania) Virgil Dridea (1997–1999)
- (Romania) Silviu Dumitrescu (2000)
- (Romania) Ioan Sdrobiș (2000)
- (Romania) Virgil Dridea (2000–2001)
- (Romania) Leonida Nedelcu (2002–2003)
- (Romania) Radu Troi
- (Romania) Gabriel Zahiu
- (Romania) Adrian Ionescu
- (Romania) Ionel Melenco
- (Romania) Daniel Rădulescu
