= 1984–85 Romania rugby union tour of England =

- Manager: Viorel Morariu
- Tour captain: Mircea Paraschiv
Summary
| P | W | D | L |
Total
| 3 | 0 | 0 | 3 |
Test match
| 1 | 0 | 0 | 1 |
Opponent
| P | W | D | L |
England
| 1 | 0 | 0 | 1 |

The 1984–85 Romania rugby union tour of England was a series of three matches played by the Romania national rugby union team in England in December 1984 and January 1985. The Romanian team lost all three of their tour matches including the single international against the England national rugby union team.

It was the first official match between England and Romania, at that time the best European team outside the Five Nations tournament.

== Results ==
29 December 1984

| Northern Division, England | 17–8 | Romania XV |

Birkenhead

1 January 1985

| South & S West of England | 15–3 | Romania XV |

Kingsholm, Gloucester

5 January 1985

| England | 22–15 | Romania |

Twickenham, London
