= Altıntepe (disambiguation) =

Altıntepe is a Urartian fortress and temple archaeological site, Turkey .

Altıntepe, Altyntepe, Altyn Tepe, Altyntepe, Altintepe, Altindepe, etc., meaning Golden Hill in Turkic languages, may also refer to:

== Populated places in Turkey ==
- Altıntepe, Eyyübiye, a township and neighborhood (mahalle) in Eyyübiye district, Şanlıurfa Province, Turkey
- Altıntepe, Haliliye, a township and neighborhood in Haliliye district, Şanlıurfa Province, Turkey
- Altıntepe, Maltepe, a neighborhood (mahalle) in Maltepe district, Istanbul, Turkey
- Altıntepe, Menderes, a township and neighborhood in Menderes district, İzmir Province, Turkey
- Altıntepe, Sarayköy, a village in Sarayköy district, Denizli Province, Turkey
- Altıntepe, Tuşba, a township and neighborhood in Tusba district, Van Province, Turkey
- Altıntepe, Yakutiye, a township and neighborhood in Yakutiye district, Erzurum Province, Turkey

== Other ==
- Altın Tepe Mound, an archaeological site in İzmir Province, Turkey
- Altyndepe, a Bronze Age (BMAC) archaeological site in Turkmenistan

== See also ==
- Altân Tepe mine, Romania
- Altyntobe, Kazakhstan
- kk:Алтынтөбе
