= Divizia Națională (disambiguation) =

Divizia Naţională (Romanian: National Division), may refer to:

- Moldovan National Division, association football
- SuperLiga (rugby), former name of Romania's main rugby union competition
