= Octavian Morariu =

Romanian rugby union player and coach

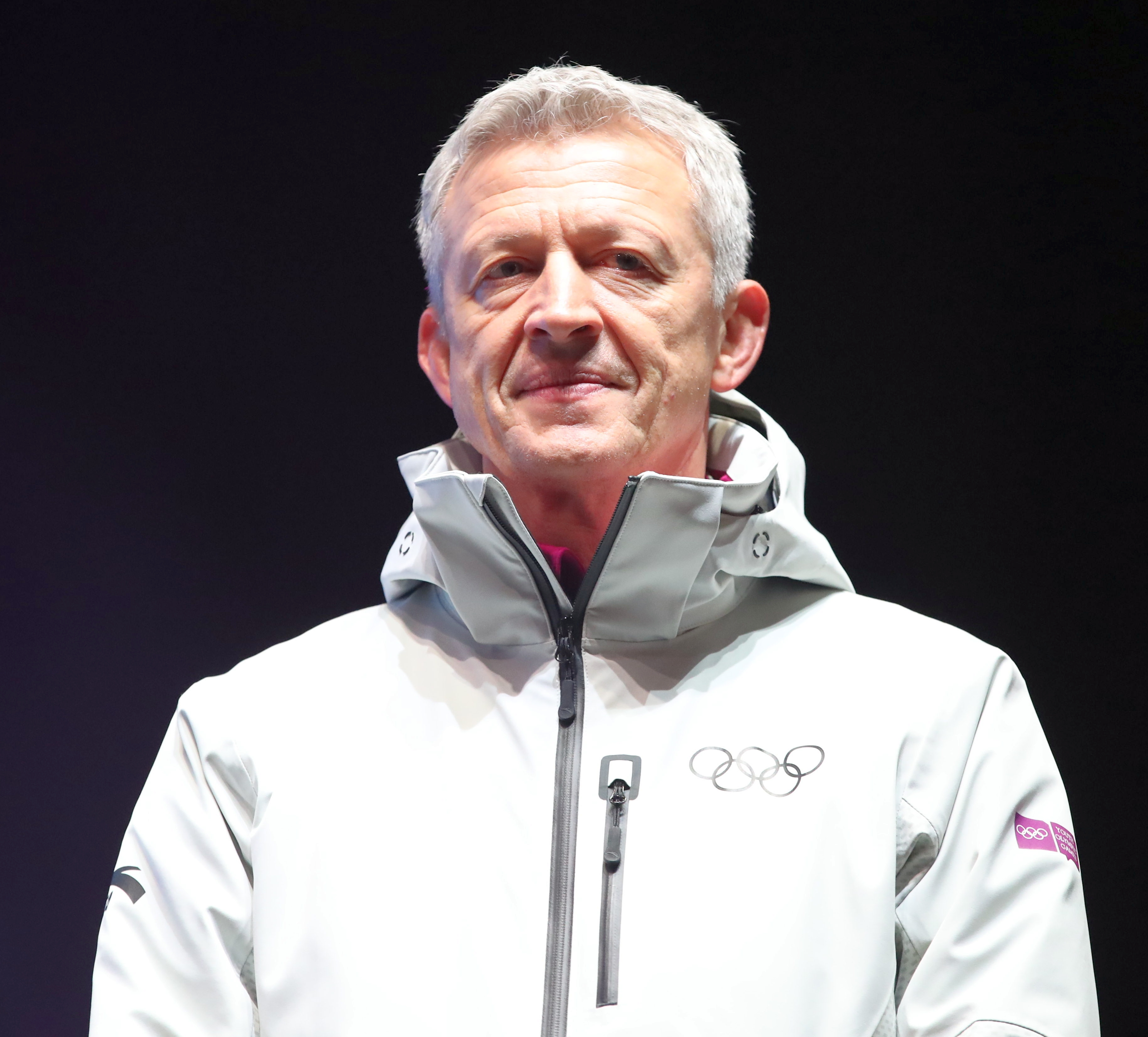
- Morariu at the 2020 Winter Youth Olympics
- Born: Octavian Morariu; 7 August 1961 (age 65) Bucharest, Romania
- Height: 1.93 m (6 ft 4 in)
- School: Gheorghe Lazăr National College
- University: Facultatea de Căi ferate, Drumuri și Poduri
- Notable relative: Viorel Morariu (father)

Rugby union career
- Position: Flanker
Youth career
- 1974–1980: RC Grivița București
Senior career
Years	Team	Apps	(Points)
1980–1987	Grivița București		
1987–1990	ASPTT Paris		
1987	Barbarians		
International career
Years	Team	Apps	(Points)
1984–1985	Romania	2	(0)
Coaching career
- Years: Team
- 1991–1993: Paris Saint-Germain

Octavian Morariu (born 7 August 1961 in Bucharest) is a Romanian former rugby union player, former president of Rugby Europe, and member of the International Olympic Committee's executive board.

== Career ==
He is the son of former Romania rugby union international Viorel Morariu and Cornelia Timoșanu, a former Romanian international volleyball player whose team finished second at the 1956 FIVB Volleyball World Championship in France. Morariu began his rugby career with local club Grivița București, playing as a flanker, before moving to France to play for ASPTT Paris. He earned two caps for Romania between 1984 and 1985.

He was the first Romanian to represent the Barbarians, playing against Swansea during the 1987 Easter tour. After retiring as a player in the 1990s, Morariu briefly coached and began transitioning into sports administration.

From 2001 to 2003, he served as president of the Romanian Rugby Federation, and from 2004 to 2014, he led the Romanian Olympic and Sports Committee. Since 2012, he has been president of Rugby Europe, the governing body for rugby union in Europe, and was unanimously re-elected for a second term in 2016.

Morariu joined the International Olympic Committee (IOC) in 2013. He served on the International Relations Commission from 2014 to 2015 and has been serving on the Public Affairs and Social Development through Sport Commission since 2015.

In March 2025, he was elected to the International Olympic Committee's executive board.

== Orders ==
- Order of the Star of Romania with the rank of Knight: 2012
- Chevalier of the Ordre national du Mérite: 2014
