= Stadionul Steaua =

Stadionul Steaua may refer to either of two football stadiums in Bucharest, Romania:

- Stadionul Steaua (1974), the original stadium, demolished in 2018
- Stadionul Steaua (2021), its replacement
