= Stadionul Flacăra (Năvodari) =

Romanian sports venue

Coordinates: 44.3249°N 28.6185°E

- Interactive map of Stadionul Flacăra
- Former names: Petromidia
- Location: Năvodari, Romania
- Owner: Năvodari Municipality
- Operator: CS Năvodari
- Capacity: 5,000
- Surface: grass

Construction
- Opened: 1960
- Renovated: 2014

Tenants
- Midia Năvodari (1993–2008); CS Năvodari (rugby union) (2007–present); Săgeata Năvodari (2010–2015); CS Năvodari (2015–present)

Flacăra Stadium is a multi-use stadium in Năvodari. It currently is the home ground of CS Năvodari. It holds 5,000 people.
