= Stadionul Săgeata =

Multi-purpose stadium in Romania

- Location: Stejaru, Romania
- Owner: Stejaru City Hall
- Operator: Săgeata Stejaru
- Capacity: 3,000
- Surface: Grass

Tenant
- Săgeata Stejaru

Săgeata Stadium is a multi-purpose stadium in Stejaru, Romania. It is currently used mostly for football matches and is the home ground of Săgeata Stejaru. The stadium holds 3,000 people.
