= ACS Săgeata Stejaru =

Romanian football club

Săgeata Stejaru
- Full name: Asociația Club Sportiv Săgeata Stejaru
- Nickname(s): Alb-albaștrii (The White and Blues)
- Short name: Săgeata
- Founded: 1960; 2021
- Dissolved: 2022
- Ground: Săgeata
- Capacity: 3,000
Home colours	Away colours

ACS Săgeata Stejaru was a Romanian football club based in Stejaru, Tulcea County, Romania, founded in 1960 and dissolved in 2022.

== History ==
The club played its entire history in the lower leagues of the Romanian football system, recently achieving some performances. At the end of the 2007–08 season of the Liga IV they promoted for the first time in history to the Liga III. The first season in the third league level of the Romanian football system, meant a reasonable performance, finishing 5th in the 2nd series.

In July 2009, it was announced by the Buftea mayor that CS Buftea sold its Liga II place to Săgeata Stejaru for 500,000 €.

Săgeata had a reasonable start in its first Liga II season in history, finishing 4th at the end of the first half of the championship. By the end of the season Săgeata targeted the first two places but failed to reach them and finished the championship 6th.

At the end of July 2010 the investors of AS Săgeata Stejaru decided to leave Stejaru and founded a new club in Năvodari, named AFC Săgeata Năvodari. Thus Săgeata Stejaru ended its Liga II spell and was registered in the Liga IV.

== Honours ==
Liga IV – Tulcea County

- Winners (4): 1986–87, 1995–96, 1996–97, 2007–08
- Runners-up (2): 2011–12, 2021–22
