= Leonida Nedelcu =

Romanian footballer

Personal information
- Full name: Leonida Marian Nedelcu
- Date of birth: 14 August 1952 (age 74)
- Place of birth: Râmnicu Sărat, Romania
- Height: 1.85 m (6 ft 1 in)
- Position: Striker

Youth career
- Gloria Buzău

Senior career*
| Years | Team | Apps | (Gls) |
| 1972–1974 | Gloria Buzău | 36 | (0) |
| 1974–1975 | FC Galați | 21 | (8) |
| 1975–1976 | Universitatea Craiova | 21 | (6) |
| 1976–1979 | UTA Arad | 57 | (20) |
| 1979–1982 | Politehnica Timișoara | 84 | (34) |
| 1982–1984 | Bihor Oradea | 37 | (9) |
| 1985–1986 | Strungul Arad | ? | (?) |
| 1987 | CFR Timișoara | ? | (?) |
| Total | | 256 | (77) |

International career^{‡}
| 1972–1973 | Romania U-21 | 1 | (0) |
| 1977 | Romania B | 26 | (1) |
| 1977 | Romania | 1 | (0) |

Managerial career
- 1984: Bihor Oradea (assistant)
- 1985–1986: Strungul Arad
- 1987: CFR Timișoara
- 1993–1997: Ceahlaul Piatra Neamt
- 1997–1998: Hutteen Latakia
- 1998: WAF
- 1998–1999: Al-Majd
- 2000: Politehnica Iași
- 2001–2002: Syria U-20
- 2002: Laminorul Roman
- 2002–2003: Midia Năvodari
- 2003: Altay Constanța
- 2003–2004: Al-Hazem
- 2004: Gloria Buzău
- 2005–2006: FCM Târgoviște
- 2006: New Radiant
- 2007: Arieșul Turda
- 2008–2009: Najran (assistant)
- 2011–2012: Senegal Football Academy
- 2012–2013: ABC Stoicescu
- 2013–2014: Zwegabin United
- 2015–2016: Zakho (assistant)
- 2018–: WOSPAC Palestine (Academy)
- * Club domestic league appearances and goals as of 24 March 2018 ‡ National team caps and goals as of 24 March 2018

Leonida "Loni" Nedelcu (also known as Leonida Nedelcu II; born 14 August 1952) is a Romanian former professional footballer who played as a striker, currently the manager of WOSPAC Palestina. In his career "Loni" Nedelcu played for various Romanian teams such as: Gloria Buzău, Universitatea Craiova, UTA Arad, Politehnica Timișoara or Bihor Oradea, among others. In the late years of his player career, Nedelcu started also to coach at Strungul Arad and CFR Timișoara. As a coach he is recognized as a true globe-trotter, managing very successfully teams from Romania, Syria, Morocco, Myanmar, Maldives, Iraq, Saudi Arabia and most recently Palestine.

== International career ==
Leonida Nedelcu played in 30 matches for Romania and in other 4 matches for Romania U-21 and Romania B.

== Personal life ==
His daughter is married to the former Gloria Buzău goalkeeper Antoniu Stoian.
