= Alexandru Marin (rugby union) =

Romania international rugby union player

- Born: Alexandru Marin Bucătaru; September 28, 1957 (age 69) Bucharest, Romania
- Height: 1.83 m (6 ft 0 in)
- Weight: 76 kg (12 st 0 lb)
- School: public Alimentation
- University: management Turism/Artifex-Bucaharest
- Occupation: manager R.C.Grivita

Rugby union career
- Position(s): Fullback, Wing
Youth career
- 1971-1976: Clubul Sportiv Școlar
Senior career
Years	Team	Apps	(Points)
1976-1989	R.C. Grivița		
International career
Years	Team	Apps	(Points)
1977–1987	Romania	13	(0)
Coaching career
- Years: Team
- 1989-2005: R.C. Grivița (youth team)
- 2002-2006: Romania U-19
- 2006-: Romania B
- 2007: Romania A
- 2008: R.C. Grivița
- 2012: Agronomia (women's sevens)

Alexandru Marin (born 28 November 1957 in Bucharest), also known as Sandu the Chef, is a former Romanian rugby union football player and currently coach. He played as fullback and as wing.

== Career ==
In his career, Marin played for R.C. Grivița.

Cariera antrenor

România U-20 , 2009

== International career ==
Marin was first capped in the match against Czechoslovakia, in Bucharest, on 9 April 1978. He also played the 1987 Rugby World Cup, with his only match in the tournament, against Zimbabwe, being also the last of his international career.

== Honours ==
R.C. Grivița

FIRA U-19 1976 Vice Campion

- Cupa României: 1982–83, 1984–85, 1985–86

Romania

- FIRA Trophy: 1980-81
