= Costel Lazăr =

Romanian footballer

Personal information
- Date of birth: 19 June 1962 (age 64)
- Place of birth: Ploiești, Romania
- Height: 1.78 m (5 ft 10 in)
- Positions: Midfielder; central defender

Senior career*
Years	Team	Apps	(Gls)
1984–1988	Steaua Mizil		
1989–1992	Petrolul Ploiești (Note: The statistics for the 1988–89 Divizia B season are unavailable.)	94	(39)
1993	Hapoel Tel Aviv	25	(7)
1993–1994	Shimshon Tel Aviv		
1994–1995	Steaua Mizil	13	(5)
1995–1996	Poiana Câmpina	33	(8)
1996	Danubiana Ploiești	16	(6)
1997–1998	Midia Năvodari (Note: The statistics for the 1996–97 Divizia C season are unavailable.)	15	(1)
Total		196	(66)

International career
1991	Romania	2	(0)

Managerial career
- 2001: Petrolul Ploiești
- 2023–: Focșani (executive president)
- * Club domestic league appearances and goals

Costel Lazăr (born 19 June 1962) is a Romanian former footballer who played as a midfielder. After ending his playing career, he worked as a sports director at Astra Giurgiu and Petrolul Ploiești, also coaching the latter for a few Divizia A rounds in 2001.

== International career ==
Costel Lazăr played two friendly games at international level for Romania against Egypt.

== Honours ==
Petrolul Ploiești

- Divizia B: 1988–89

Midia Năvodari

- Divizia C: 1996–97
