= Sean Morrell =

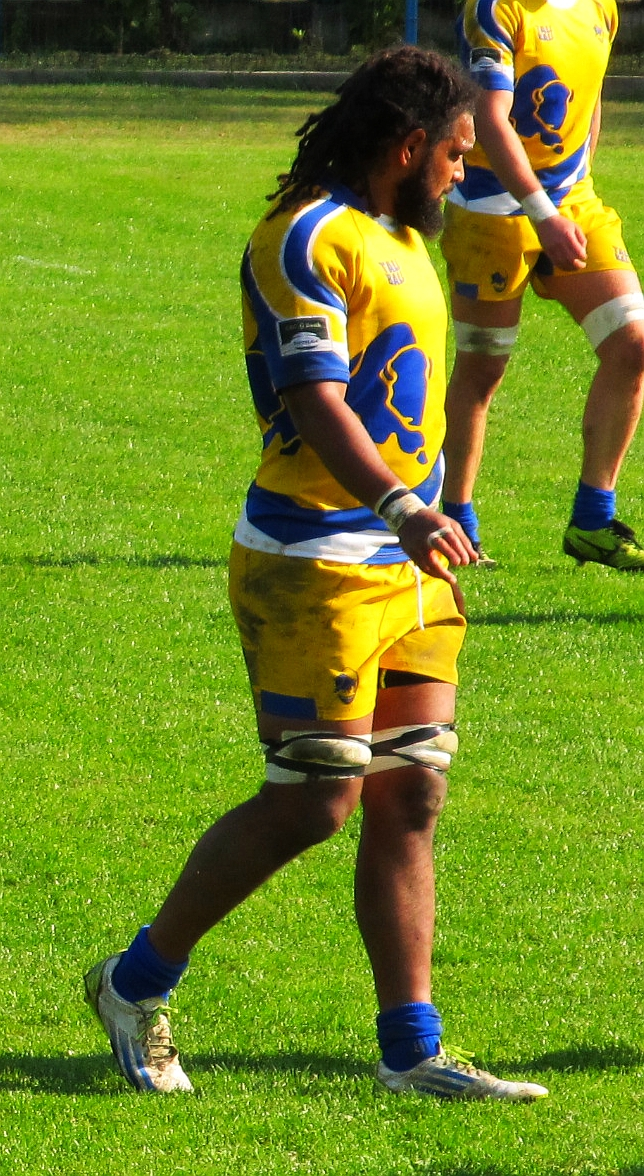
- Sean Morrell during a SuperLiga match in 2015
- Born: 23 August 1986 (age 40) Fiji
- Height: 1.89 m (6 ft 2 in)
- Weight: 99 kg (15 st 8 lb)
- School: Mount Albert Grammar School

Rugby union career
- Position: Flanker
Senior career
Years	Team	Apps	(Points)
- Ponsonby RFC
- King Country
2011-	CSM Baia Mare		
International career
Years	Team	Apps	(Points)
2009	Fiji	1	(0)
National sevens team
Years	Team		Comps
2009	Fiji		1

Sean Morrell (born 23 August 1986) is a Fijian international rugby union player.

He played with the Ponsonby RFC winning the Gallaher Shield and also for King Country in the Heartland Championship. In 2011 he joined Romanian club CSM Baia Mare.

He won only one cap for Fiji, against Japan in the Pacific Nations Cup in June 2009. Next month he was selected for the Fiji sevens team and won gold at the 2009 World Games.

In September 2026, Morrell joined Kavallieri Rugby Club, on the island of Malta.
