= CSU Alba Iulia (rugby union) =

Romanian men's rugby team

- Full name: CSU Alba Iulia
- Founded: 2007; 19 years ago
- Location: Alba Iulia, Romania
- Ground: Cetate (Capacity: 18,000)
- Chairman: Marius Rotar
- Coach(es): Veaceslav Titica, Oleg Istratii
- Captain: Florin Muresan Coge
- League: 2024 Divizia Națională de Seniori

Clubul Sportiv Universitatea Alba Iulia, also known as CS Universitatea Alba Iulia, or simply as CSU Rugby Alba Iulia, is a Romanian men's rugby team currently playing in the Divizia Națională de Seniori, the second division of Romanian rugby. It was founded in 2007. In March 2019 the team was reactivated by Marius Rotar (historian and researcher at the „1 Decembrie 1918” University of Alba Iulia) together with some volunteers from Alba Iulia.

The team represents the men's rugby section of the multi-sport club CSU Alba Iulia, which also include athletics, women's basketball, men's football and powerlifting sections.

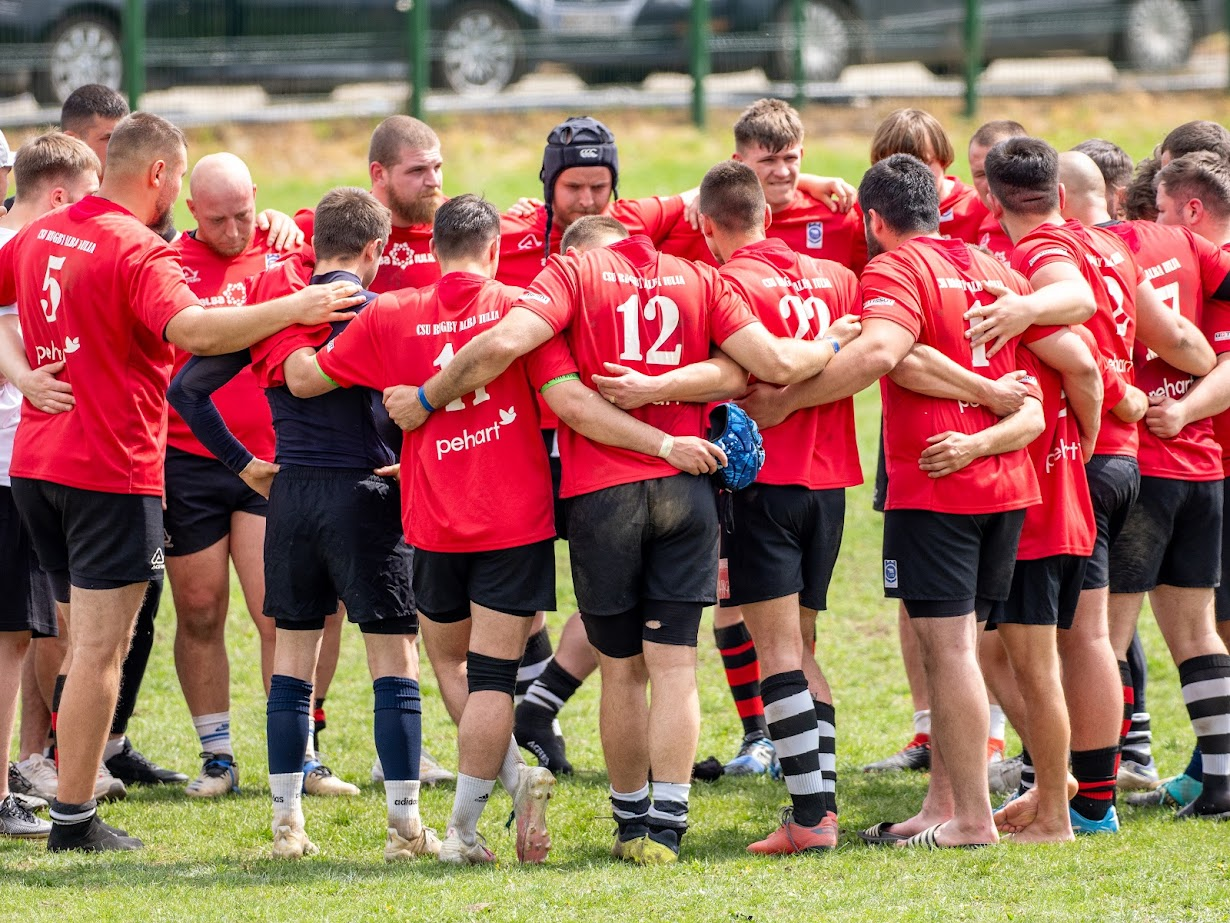
The team after a match in April 2024

CSU Alba Iulia has also played in the last three seasons in the Romanian Sevens League, its best performance being in 2021, the 7th place (from 10 teams) and 2023, the 10th place (from 14 teams).
