= CS Năvodari (rugby union) =

(Romania) CS Năvodari
- Full name: Club Sportiv Năvodari
- Founded: 2007; 18 years ago
- Location: Năvodari, Romania
- Ground: Stadionul Flacara (Capacity: 5,000)
- President: Constantin Dinicu
- Coach(es): Virgil Năstase, Suciu Cornel, Husea Cristian
- League: Liga Națională de Rugby

CS Năvodari is a Romanian rugby union club based in Năvodari, Romania. It was founded in 2007 and is currently playing in the Liga Națională de Rugby. Before entering the new league format, Navodari won in 2019 the Romanian second tier league, the Divizia Nationala de Seniori.
