= Stadionul Central (Mangalia) =

Multi-use stadium in Mangalia, Romania

Central Stadium was a multi-use stadium in Mangalia. It was the home ground of Callatis Mangalia. It had the capacity to hold 5,000 people. It was demolished in 2021.
