= Știința Petroșani =

(Romania) Știința Petroșani
- Full name: Clubul Sportiv Stiinta din Petrosani
- Founded: 1948; 78 years ago
- Location: Petrosani, Romania
- Ground: Stadionul Știința (Capacity: 2 000)
- President: Radu Sorin Mihai
- Coach: Alexandru Lupu
- Captain: Alin Ghiarasim
- League: Liga Națională de Rugby

Știința Petroșani is a Romanian rugby union club currently playing in the Liga Națională de Rugby. It was founded in 1948 and won the Romanian Cup in 1983, 1991 and 1993.

== Honours ==
- Cupa României
  - Winners (5): 1983, 1991, 1993
