= Vlad Iordăchescu =

Romanian rugby referee

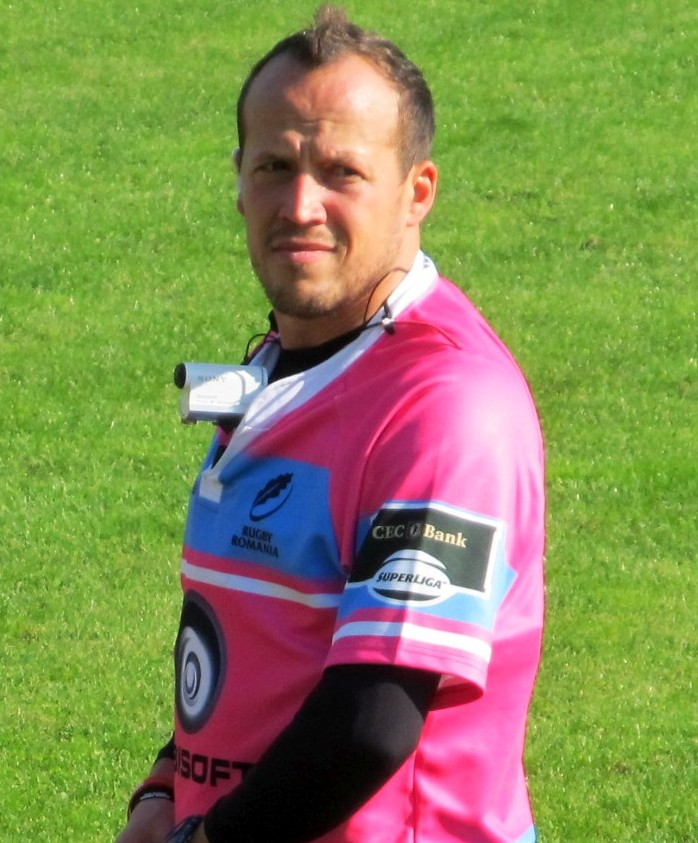
- Vlad Iordăchescu officiating in Romanian SuperLiga in 2015
- Born: Vlad Călin Iordăchescu; 9 September 1984 (age 42) Bucharest, Romania
- Occupation: pharmaceutics sales representative

Rugby union career
Refereeing career
| Years | Competition | Apps |
| - | SuperLiga | |
| - | Rugby Pro D2 | |
| - | World Rugby Tbilisi Cup | |
| 2014 | 2014 IRB Junior World Championship | |
| 2014 | British and Irish Cup | |
| - | European Rugby Challenge Cup | |
| - | World Rugby Nations Cup | |
| - | European Rugby Continental Shield | |
| - | Test Matches | |

Vlad Iordăchescu (born 9 September 1984) is a Romanian rugby referee who mainly referees club rugby in such tournaments as the Romanian SuperLiga.

== Career ==
Iordăchescu is considered by many the most valuable referee in Romanian Rugby.

Iordăchescu refereed 3 matches at the 2014 IRB Junior World Championship in New Zealand: Australia v Italy, France v Fiji and the 11th place game Fiji v Italy.

He refereed international Rugby union tests as early as 2009.

He also refereed the Belgium vs Tunisia test match in 2013.

Besides officiating in Romanian SuperLiga, Iordăchescu has been called to officiate in other European and International competitions such as: Rugby Pro D2, World Rugby Tbilisi Cup, British and Irish Cup, European Rugby Challenge Cup, World Rugby Nations Cup, European Rugby Continental Shield.

Following the controversial game between Belgium and Spain, where Iordăchescu made 23 suspicious decisions favoring Belgium, resulting in the qualification, then revoked, of Romania for the 2019 World Cup, the Rugby Romanian Federation was forced to withdraw him to refer the 1/4 final of the Champion Cup of Rugby between Pau - Stade Français due to happen the 30 March 2018
