= Altân Tepe mine =

Copper mine in Romania

- Location within Romania
- Location: Stejaru, Tulcea County, Romania; 44°47′27.67″N 28°33′55.98″E
- Products: Copper
- Opened: 1898
- Closed: 2003
- Company: Minbucovina

The Altân Tepe mine (from Turkish "altın tepe", "golden hill") was a large mine in the east of Romania in Tulcea County, 63 km southwest of Tulcea and 215 km north-east of the capital, Bucharest. Altân Tepe represents the third largest copper reserve in Romania having estimated reserves of 200 million tonnes of ore grading 0.4% copper. After operation for 105 years, it was closed and conserved in 2003 due to nonprofitability. It had also problems with water contamination.
