= CSM Galați (rugby union) =

Romanian rugby union club

(Romania) CSM Galați
- Full name: Clubul Sportiv Municipal Galați
- Founded: 2018; 8 years ago
- Location: Galați, Romania
- Ground: Stadionul Municipal (Capacity: 1000)
- President: Claudiu Stoian
- Coach: Marius Secuianu
- League: Liga Națională de Rugby

CSM Galați is an amateur Romanian rugby union club founded in 2018. As of 2022, it is the youngest club playing in the top-tier Romanian Liga Națională de Rugby.
