= Stejaru, Tulcea =

Stejaru
- Commune
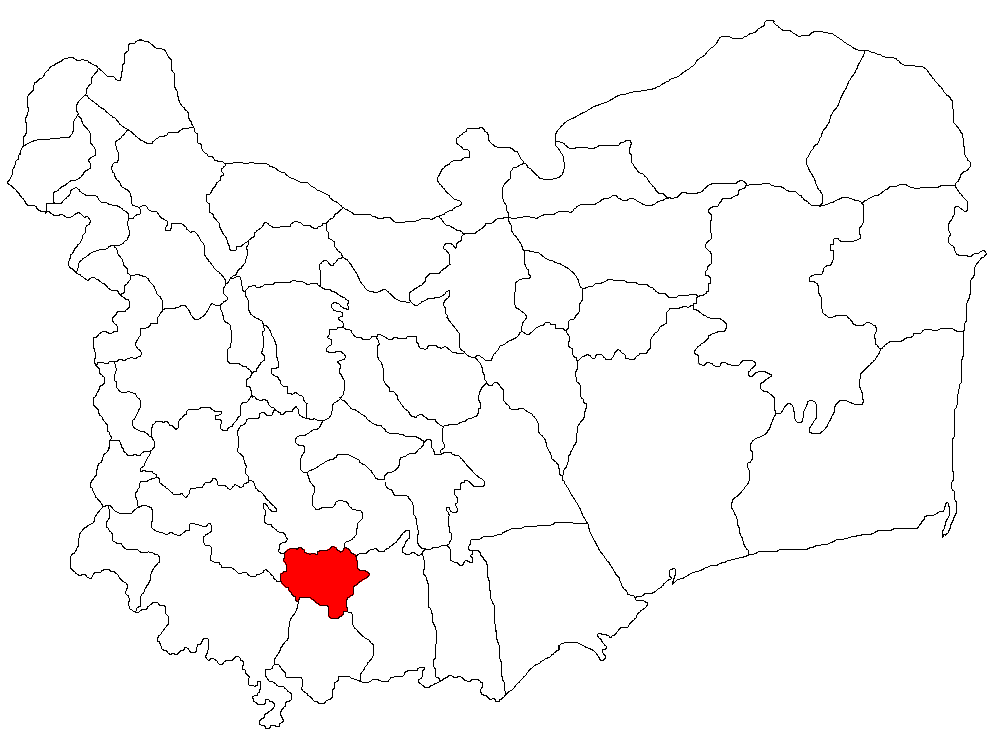
- Location in Tulcea County

- Location in Romania
- Coordinates: 44°46′N 28°33′E
- Country: Romania
- County: Tulcea
- Subdivisions: Mina Altân Tepe, Stejaru, Vasile Alecsandri

Government
  - Mayor (2020–2024): Enache Dumitru (PNL)
- Area: 48.29 km^{2} (18.64 sq mi)
- Elevation: 190 m (620 ft)
- Population (2021-12-01): 1,242
  - Density: 25.72/km^{2} (66.61/sq mi)
- Time zone: UTC+02:00 (EET)
  - Summer (DST): UTC+03:00 (EEST)
- Postal code: 827215
- Area code: +40 x40
- Vehicle reg.: TL
- Website: primaria-stejaru.ro

Stejaru is a commune in Tulcea County, Northern Dobruja, Romania. It is composed of three villages: Mina Altân Tepe, Stejaru (historical names: Eschibaba, Karapelit), and Vasile Alecsandri.

The commune is located in the south-central part of the county, 53 km (33 mi) south of the county seat, Tulcea, and 95 km (59 mi) north of Constanța, the largest port on the Black Sea.

Historical population
Year	Pop.	±%
2002	2,294	—
2011	1,570	−31.6%
2021	1,242	−20.9%
Source: Census data

In Stejaru there is the most compact Aromanian community of Romania. The Aromanian language is taught in the schools of the commune.

The Altân Tepe copper mine is situated on the territory of the commune; after operating for 105 years, the mine was closed in 2003 due to non-profitability.

Stadionul Săgeata is a multi-purpose stadium in Stejaru; built in 1960, this is the home ground of the football club Săgeata Stejaru.
