= Viorel Morariu =

Romania international rugby union player & coach

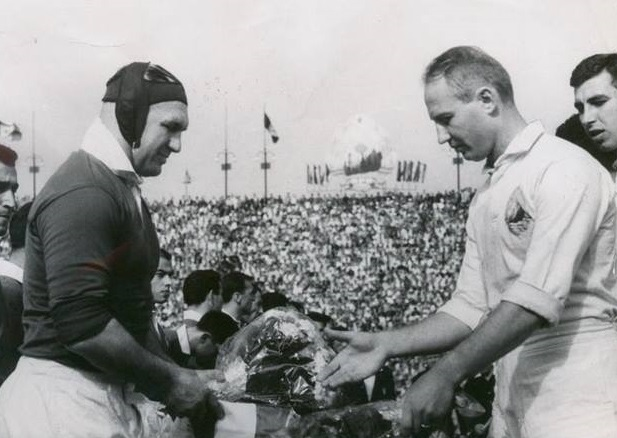
- Morariu (right) and Sergio Lanfranchi in 1962.
- Born: Viorel Morariu; 18 October 1931 Cuciulata, Romania
- Died: 23 May 2017 (aged 85) Bucharest, Romania
- Notable relative: Octavian Morariu (son)

Rugby union career
- Position: Flanker
Senior career
Years	Team	Apps	(Points)
1947-1964	RC Grivița București		
International career
Years	Team	Apps	(Points)
1952-1964	Romania	22	(3)

Viorel Morariu (18 October 1931 – 23 May 2017) was a Romanian rugby union flanker. He was one of the best Romanian rugby players of his generation.

His son, Octavian, was also a rugby player, and both served as presidents of the Romanian Rugby Federation.

== International career ==
Morariu was a consistent member of the Romanian national team throughout the 1950s and 1960s and was a former captain of the team.

== Awards ==
In 2012, he received the Vernon Pugh Award for Distinguished Service for his contributions to rugby.

== Death ==
Morariu died on 23 May 2017 at the age of 85.

== Gallery ==
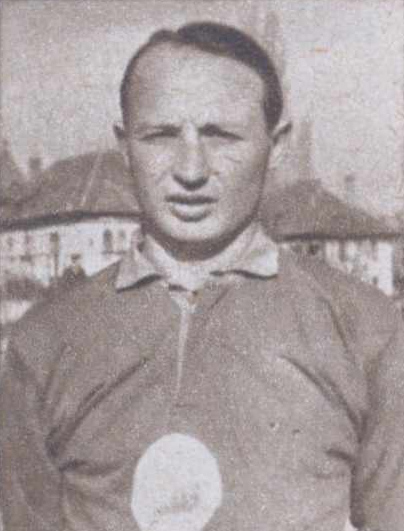
Morariu with the Romania national team in December 1963

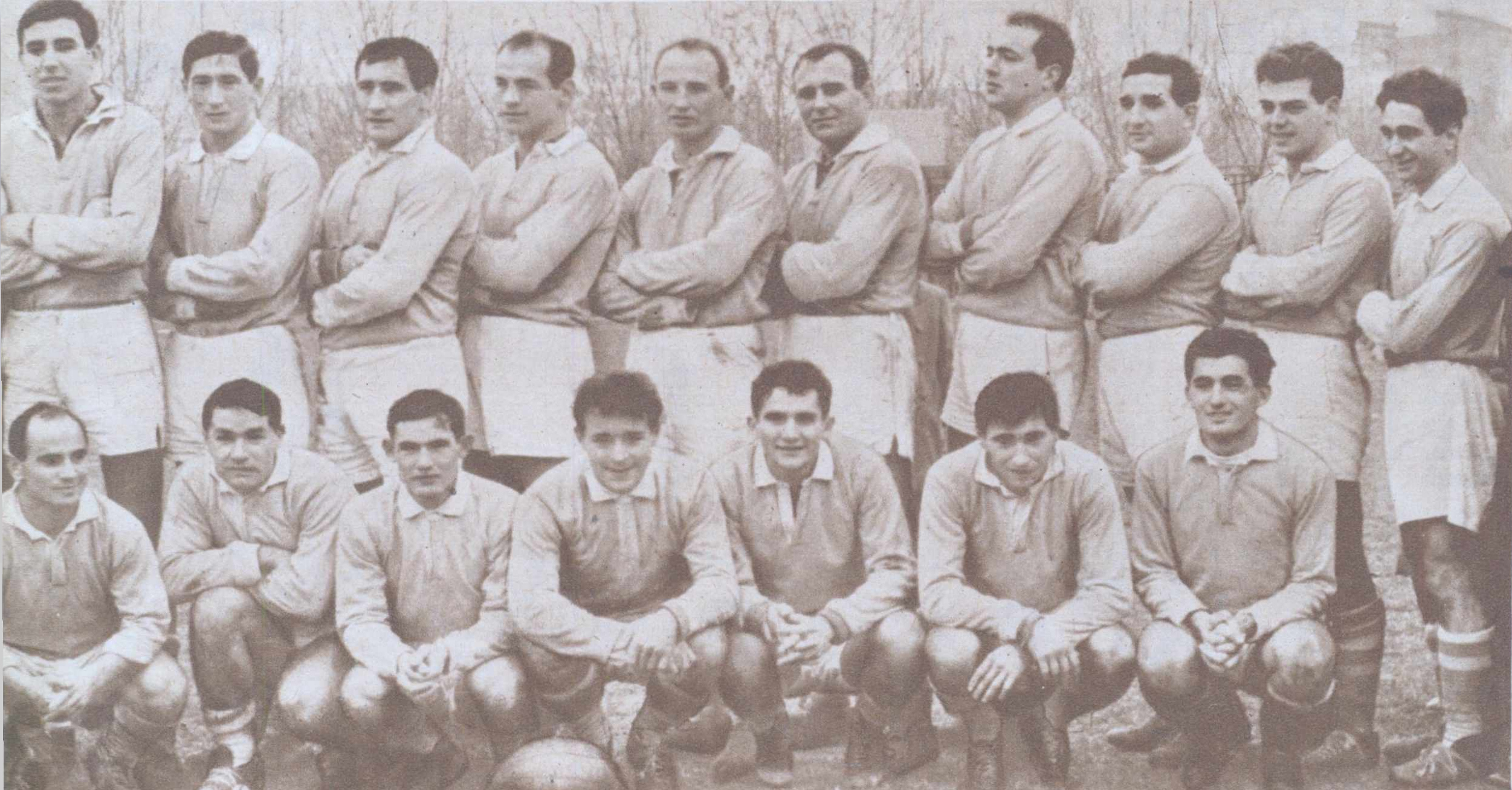
Morariu (back row, center) with Grivița București in 1963

== See also ==
- List of Romania national rugby union players
