= RC Bârlad =

Romanian rugby union club, based in Bârlad

(Romania) RC Bârlad
- Full name: Club de Drept Public Rugby Club Bârlad
- Founded: 1958; 68 years ago
- Location: Bârlad, Romania
- Ground: Stadionul Rulmentul (Capacity: 2,000)
- President: Bogdan Dumitriu
- Coach: Ioan Harnagea
- League: Liga Națională de Rugby

Official website
- rcbarlad.ro

RC Bârlad is a Romanian rugby union club currently playing in the Liga Națională de Rugby. It was founded in 1958 and won the Romanian Cup in 1986 and 1987.
