= Cristian Săuan =

Romania international rugby union player

- Born: 18 March 1974 (age 52) Cluj-Napoca, Romania
- Height: 6 ft 0 in (1.83 m)
- Weight: 209 lb (95 kg)

Rugby union career
- Position: Wing
Senior career
Years	Team	Apps	(Points)
1992–2001	U Cluj		
2001–2007	Rovigo		
2007–2009	Mogliano		
2009–2014	U Cluj		
International career
Years	Team	Apps	(Points)
1999–2007	Romania	37	(70)

Cristian Daniel Săuan (born 18 March 1974 in Cluj-Napoca) is a former Romanian rugby union player. He played as a wing.

Săuan played for U Cluj, in Romania, from 1992/93 to 2000/01. He was runners-up of the National Championship in 2000/01, his best result at the team. He moved to become a professional in Rugby Rovigo Delta, in Italy, where he played from 2001/02 to 2006/07. He was runners-up to the Cup of Italy in 2006. He moved afterwards to San Marco Rugby Club, playing there from 2007/08 to 2008/09. He returned to Universitatea Cluj in 2009/10, where he finished his career in 2013/14.

He had 37 caps for Romania, from 1999 to 2007, scoring 14 tries, 70 points on aggregate. He won three titles of the European Nations Cup, in 2000, 2001/02 and 2005/06. He was called for the 1999 Rugby World Cup, playing in three games and scoring a try, and for the 2003 Rugby World Cup, playing in four games and scoring another try.

Since 2020, Săuan is the current coach of U Cluj Rugby, which plays in the Romanian SuperLiga.
