= Sosene Anesi =

NZ international rugby union player

- Full name: Sosene Raymond Anesi
- Born: 3 June 1981 (age 45) Apia, Samoa
- Height: 187 cm (6 ft 2 in)
- Weight: 90 kg (198 lb; 14 st 2 lb)
- School: St Joseph's College, Samoa.

Rugby union career
- Position(s): Wing, Fullback
- Current team: CS Dinamo București
Senior career
Years	Team	Apps	(Points)
2003–2010	Waikato	91	(165)
2005–2009	Chiefs	41	(60)
2010–2011	Waratahs	21	(15)
2011–2012	NTT Shining Arcs	8	(10)
2013	Parramatta Two Blues	8	(15)
2014–2016	Timișoara Saracens	12	(5)
- Correct as of 10 June 2019
International career
Years	Team	Apps	(Points)
2005	New Zealand	1	(0)
2005–2006	Junior All Blacks	6	(0)
2008	Barbarian F.C.	1	(0)
- Correct as of 10 June 2019
National sevens teams
Years	Team		Comps
1999–2000	Samoa		
2004–2006	New Zealand		
- Correct as of 10 June 2019
Coaching career
- Years: Team
- 2018–2021: Timișoara Saracens
- 2021–: Dinamo București
- Correct as of 10 May 2021
Medal record
Men's rugby sevens
Representing New Zealand
Commonwealth Games
Gold medal – first place	2006 Melbourne	Team competition

Sosene Raymond Anesi (born 3 June 1981 in Apia, Samoa) is a former rugby union footballer who played as a fullback and wing and currently the head coach of Romania's current champions CS Dinamo București.

== Career ==
Anesi came from Samoa to New Zealand in 2000 on a rugby scholarship arranged between St Joseph's College in Apia and St John's College in Hamilton. He made his National Provincial Championship debut for Waikato in 2003. He played for the Chiefs in the Super 14 up until 2007. He made his All Blacks debut from the bench in 2005 against Fiji at Albany, but did not play any further tests. In 2010 and 2011, he played for the Waratahs in the Super Rugby competition, in 2012 played for NTT Communications Shining Arcs Japan's Top League and the NSW Shute Shield competition for the Parramatta Two Blues Rugby club. He now plays for RCM MVT Timișoara, 2012 and 2013 SuperLiga Champion from Romania.

In November 2007 Anesi was charged with assault. He was given diversion.

=== Sevens ===
He was a member of the New Zealand sevens team in 2004 and again in the team that won gold at the 2006 Commonwealth Games in Melbourne.

=== 2007 neck injury ===
Anesi fractured his neck in the second round Super 14 match against the Wellington Hurricanes at Waikato Stadium on 9 February 2007. A strong tackle from Hurricanes winger Ma'a Nonu resulted in the injury which rules Anesi out for season 2007. Immediate surgery was not required, but he needed to go through a rehabilitation period. Anesi returned in the second season of the Air New Zealand Cup.

=== 2013 Superliga Champions ===
Anesi now plays for RCM MVT Timișoara and was a member of the premiership winning team of 2013. Anesi is the first ever All Black and one of the first ever Super Rugby players to play in the SuperLiga. His debut in the Superliga against Farul Constanţa was on 13 July 2013 in Stadionul de Rugby Mihai Naca|Constanța. He was not the only Super Rugby player to debut, with Nathan Eyres-Brown the former Queensland Reds player debuting for Farul Constanţa.
