= RC Grivița București =

Romanian rugby union club, based in Bucharest

RC Grivița
- Full name: RC Grivița - UNEFS București
- Founded: 1932; 94 years ago
- Location: Bucharest, Romania
- Ground: Stadionul Arcul de Triumf (Capacity: 8,207)
- President: Claudiu Alexandru
- Coach: Alexandru Marin
- Captain: Damian Ispas
- League: Liga Națională de Rugby

RC Grivița București is a Romanian rugby union club currently playing in the Liga Națională de Rugby. They have won the Liga Națională de Rugby 12 times and the European Rugby Champions Cup in 1964.

== History ==
Grivița Rugby Club is a Romanian rugby team with a storied history spanning over 80 years. It holds a prominent place among the most distinguished rugby teams in Romanian history. Throughout its existence, the club has been associated with some of the most well known players in Romanian rugby, including renowned players such as Gheorghe Pârcălăbescu, Constantin Titi Cocor, Dumitru "Bombi" Zamfir, Viorel Morariu, Mihai Wusek, Mihai Tibuleac, Valeriu Irimescu, Costel Stănescu, Radu Demian, Constantin Dinu, Cornel Scarlat, and many other players who have significantly contributed to the sport's growth in Romania. Notably, these players often formed the nucleus of the Romanian national rugby team during its periods of prominence.

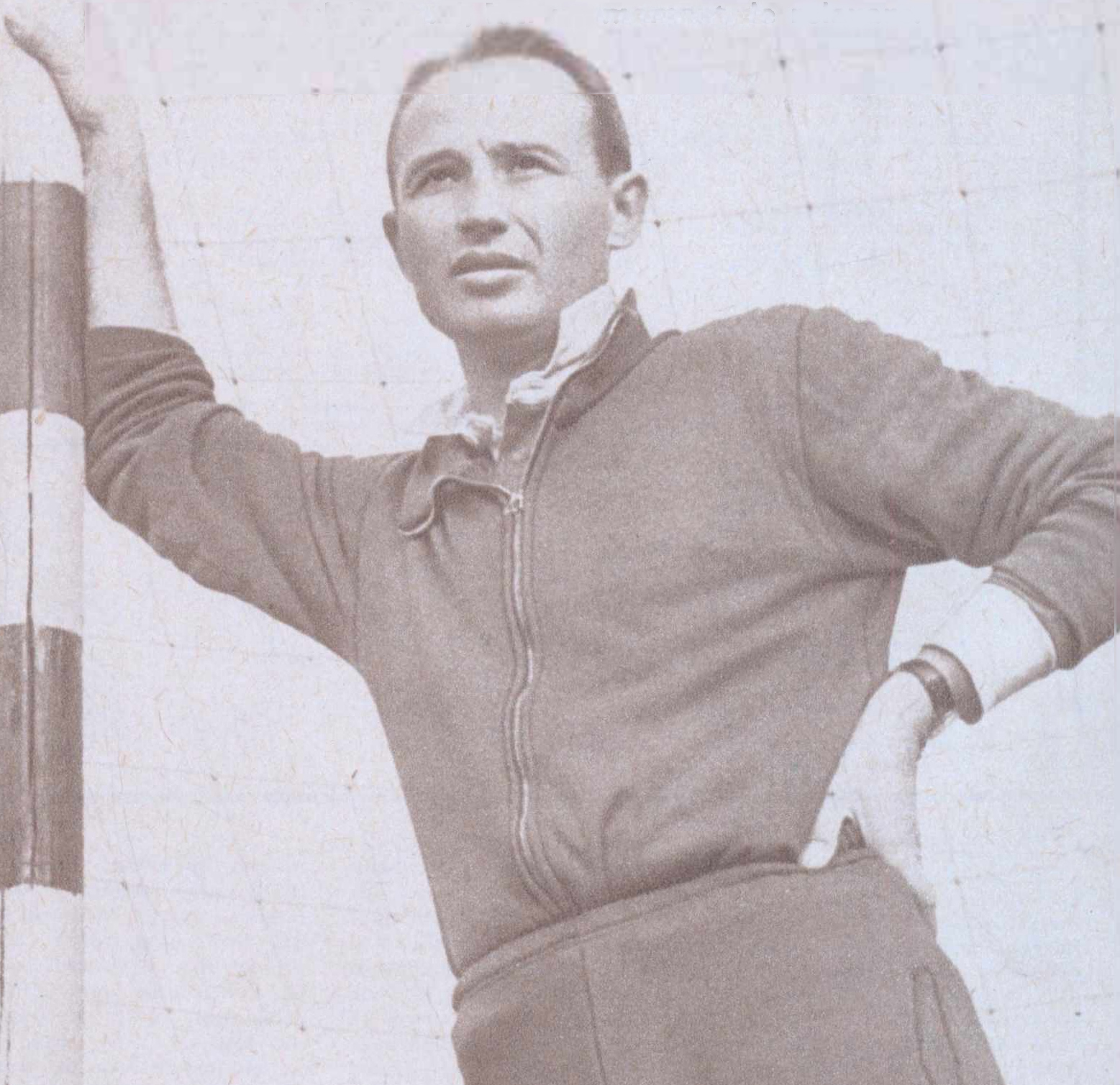
Viorel Morariu, captain of the Golden Grivița team

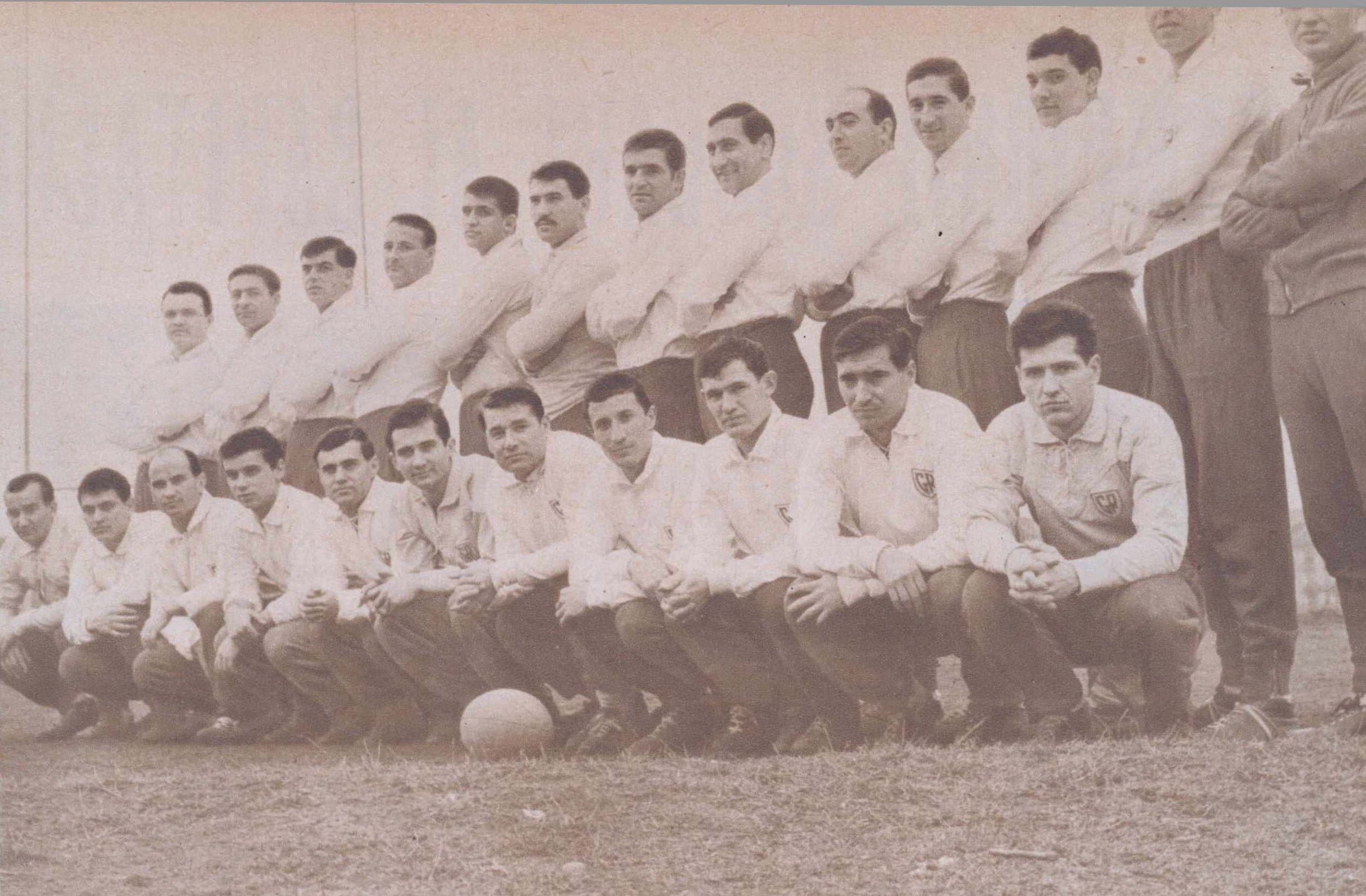
The Grivița squad in 1966

Founded in 1932 under the initial name of CFR, the club embarked on a series of nomenclatural changes. By 1950, it evolved into Locomotiva–CFR, a name that underwent further streamlining to Locomotiva in 1955. A subsequent renaming in 1957 led to the appellation Locomotiva–Grivița Roșie. This nomenclatural journey persisted from 1958 to 1960 when the team competed under the designation CFR–Grivița Roșie. Ultimately, from 1962 onward, the club embraced the more succinct title of Grivița Roșie. Following the transformative events of the 1989 Revolution, the appellation was further refined, resulting in the adoption of Grivița as the club's name.

The club's administrative operations and home matches have been centered at Stadionul Parcul Copilului in Bucharest since 1953. This stadium also serves as the club's primary venue for its fixtures.

The transition to professionalism in the realm of rugby had a discernible impact on the club's trajectory, leading to a phase characterized by performance setbacks. This culminated in the club's relegation to lower-tier leagues, where it spent a duration of ten years. Despite these challenges, Grivița remains entrenched as the third most decorated Romanian rugby outfit, trailing behind the more heralded Steaua and Dinamo București.

In a significant development in 2022, coinciding with an expansion of the elite tier, Grivița achieved a notable resurgence as it secured its reentry into the prestigious Liga Națională (National League). For the top-tier matches the club uses Stadionul Arcul de Triumf.

== Honours ==
- European Rugby Champions Cup
  - Winners (1): 1964
  - Runners-up (1): 1962
- Liga Națională de Rugby:
  - Winners (12): 1948, 1950, 1955, 1957, 1958, 1959, 1960, 1962, 1966, 1967, 1969–70, 1992–93
- Cupa României
  - Winners (5): 1947, 1948, 1982, 1984, 1985
