= Stadionul Gheorghe Rășcanu =

Romanian rugby stadium

Gheorghe Rășcanu Stadium
- Stadionul Gheorghe Rășcanu
- Address: Ronaț; Timișoara; Romania
- Coordinates: 45°45′21.9″N 21°11′2.5″E
- Owner: SCM Rugby Timișoara
- Capacity: 1,000
- Field size: 105 m × 70 m (344 ft × 230 ft)
- Surface: Grass
- Scoreboard: Yes

Construction
- Opened: 2011
- Renovated: 2018
- Construction cost: €300,000

Tenants
- SCM Rugby Timișoara (2011–present)

Gheorghe Rășcanu Stadium (Romanian: Stadionul Gheorghe Rășcanu) is a multi-purpose stadium in Timișoara, Romania. It is currently used mostly for rugby matches by the local team, SCM Rugby Timișoara. The stadium is named after Timișoara Saracens' legend Gheorghe Rășcanu who played for Timișoara during its golden era.

== History ==
The stadium was built in 2011 after the board members of the then-called Timișoara Saracens decided to set an objective of winning the title of the Romanian First Division after 40 years, which they did in the 2012–2013 season. The 300,000-euro stadium also includes minifootball pitches along with tennis and basketball pitches for the Timișoara Sports Club which owns SCM Rugby Timișoara. The stadium underwent some repair work in 2018 and 2021, and in the following years it will be completely rebuilt.
