= Arena Zimbrilor =

Rugby stadium in Baia Mare, Romania

- Interactive map of Arena Zimbrilor
- Address: 14A Unirii Boulevard
- Location: Baia Mare, Romania
- Coordinates: 47°38′52.545″N 23°34′12.105″E
- Owner: Complexul Sportiv Național Lascăr Pană
- Operator: Știința Baia Mare
- Capacity: 2,300
- Surface: Grass
- Scoreboard: Yes
- Field size: 115 x 68 m

Construction
- Opened: 1977
- Renovated: 2009, 2011

Tenant
- Știința Baia Mare (1977–present)

Website
- csnlascarpana.ro

Arena Zimbrilor (also known as Stadionul Lascăr Ghineț) is a rugby stadium in Baia Mare, Romania. It opened in 1977 and has been the home stadium of Știința Baia Mare since its completion.

== History ==
The stadium was built in 1977, the same year that the rugby union club Știința Baia Mare was founded. In 2009, the stadium had been renovated for the first time. In 2011, the stadium had been renovated for the second time.
