= RC Gura Humorului =

Romanian rugby union club, based in Gura Humorului

- Full name: Rugby Club Gura Humorului
- Founded: 2018; 8 years ago
- Location: Gura Humorului, Romania
- Ground: Stadionul Tineretului (Capacity: 3000)
- President: Gabriela Popescu
- Coach: Andrei Varvaroi
- League: Liga Națională de Rugby

Official website
- www.rugbygh.ro

RC Gura Humorului is a semi-professional rugby union club based in Gura Humorului, Suceava, Romania. It is currently playing in the Liga Națională de Rugby. It was founded in 2018.

== Current squad ==
RCGH Liga Națională de Rugby squad
**Props**: (Romania) Ovidiu Croitoru; (Romania) Iulian Citea; (Romania) Lucian Zup; (Kenya) Ian Karanja; **Hookers**: (Romania) Ioan Axinte; (Romania) Ionut Limbosu; **Locks**: (Romania) Sebastian Rusu; (Romania) Alex Donica; (Romania) Alexandru Tucaliuc	**Back row**: (South Africa) Angelo Koekemoer; (Romania) Gabriel Bivol; (Romania) Anton Lozniceru; (Romania) Mihai Hodeniuc; (Romania) Adrian Buiciuc; (Romania) Adrian Varvaroi; (Fiji) Sean Morrell; **Scrum-halves**: (Romania) Marian Popescu; (Romania) Andrei Petrisor; **Fly-halves**: (Romania) David Balan; (Romania) Mihai Dărăban (c)	**Centres**: (Romania) Cosmin Dărăban; (Romania) Daniel Varvaroi; (Romania) Marian Morosanu; (South Africa) Jarred Viljoen; **Wings**: (Kenya) Geofrey Okhwach; (Moldova) Nichita Popovici; (Romania) Gheorghe Plaiu; (Romania) Benone-Sebastian Ungureanu; (Romania) Ionut Limbosu; **Fullbacks**: (Romania) Alexandru Bandol; (Romania) Andrei Stefancu
(c) denotes the team captain, **Bold** denotes internationally capped players.^{*} denotes players qualified to play for Romania on residency or dual nationality.
