= Năvodari =

- Town
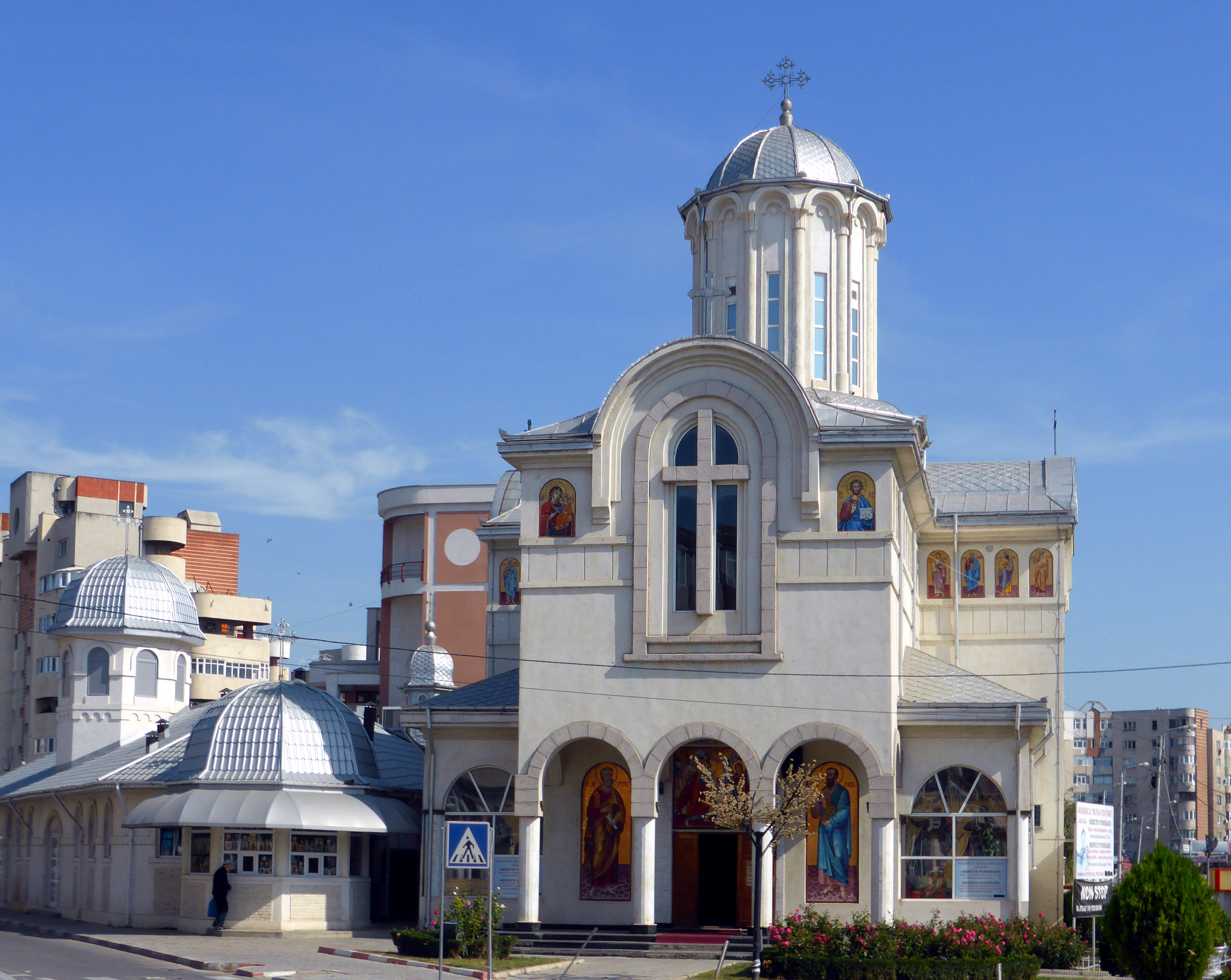
- Saint Paraskeva Church

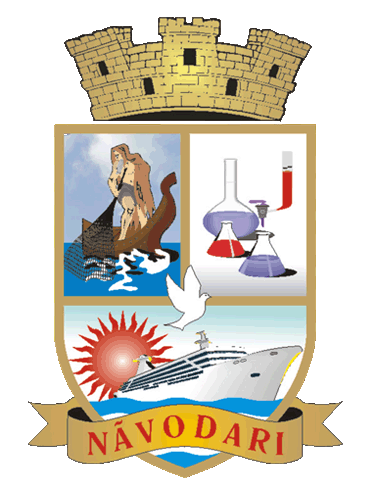
- Coat of arms

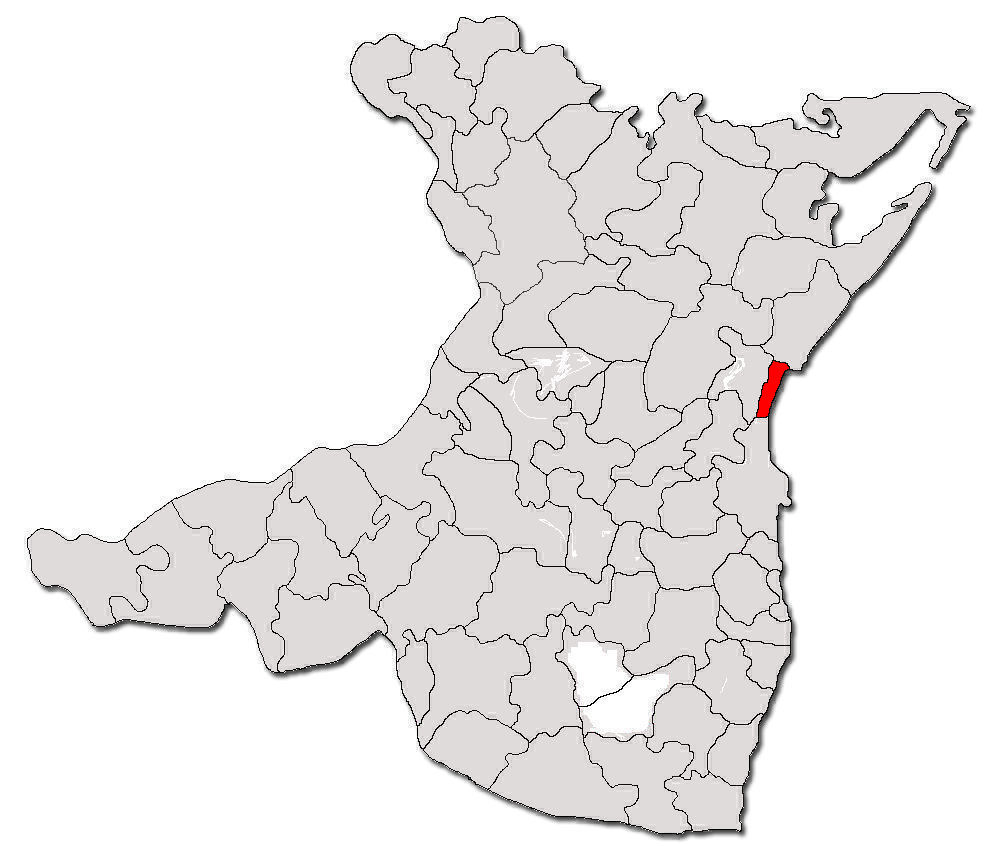
- Location in Constanța County

- Location in Romania
- Coordinates: 44°19′16″N 28°36′48″E
- Country: Romania
- County: Constanța
- Subdivisions: Mamaia-Sat

Government
  - Mayor (2024–2028): Florin Chelaru (PSD)
- Area: 70.31 km^{2} (27.15 sq mi)
- Population (2021-12-01): 34,398
  - Density: 489.2/km^{2} (1,267/sq mi)
- Time zone: UTC+02:00 (EET)
  - Summer (DST): UTC+03:00 (EEST)
- Postal code: 905700
- Area code: (+40) 02 41
- Vehicle reg.: CT
- Website: www.primaria-navodari.ro

Năvodari (Romanian pronunciation: [nəvoˈdarʲ], historical names: Carachioi; Caracoium, Turkish: Kara Koyum) is a town in Constanța County, region of Northern Dobruja, Romania, with a population of 34,398 as of 2021. The town formally includes a territorially distinct community, Social Group Peninsula, and administers the neighbouring village of Mamaia-Sat.

== Etymology ==
The name of the town means "trawlers" in Romanian.

== History ==
The settlement was mentioned for the first time in 1421 under the name Kara Koyun ("Black Sheep"), to be renamed later on Karaköy or Carachioi ("The Black Village"). In 1927, the locality was again renamed to Năvodari and after five years, on 15 August 1932, it was granted commune status.

The town developed during the communist regime as part of the industrialization program. In 1957, the superphosphate and sulfuric acid plant, also known as USAS (Uzina de Superfosfat și Acid Sulfuric), whose construction had started in 1954, was opened, paving the road towards the industrialization of the area and demographic growth. However, the factory polluted the Black Sea and Lake Tașaul with toxic dumps. In the 1990s, the pollution was greatly reduced as the factory was modernized.

In 1968 the population of Năvodari exceeded 6,500 inhabitants. A law adopted that year granted the commune of Năvodari town status and placed the Mamaia Sat village under its administration. The modernization of the town began in 1975 and was completed on 29 June 1979.

== Current status ==
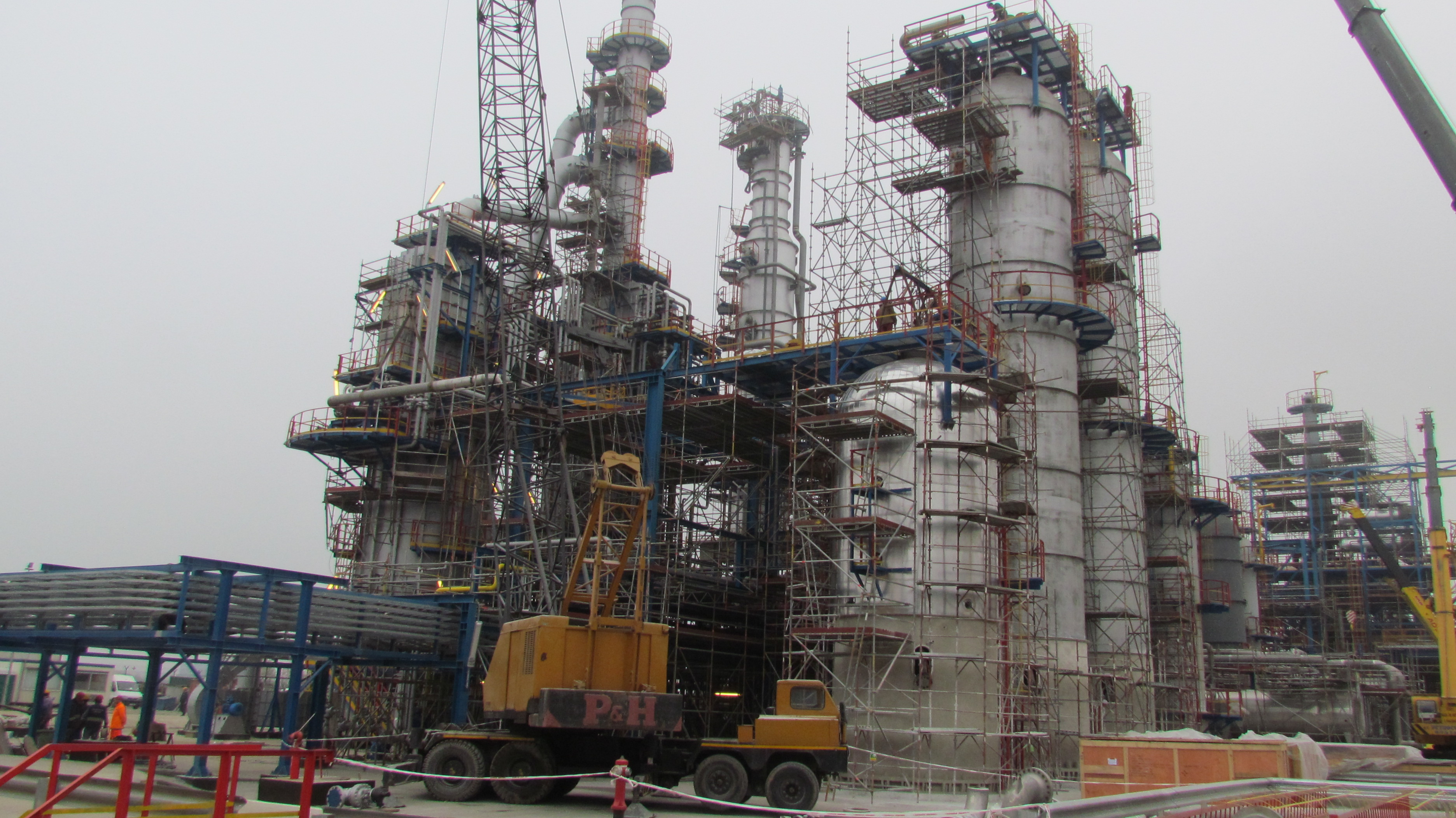
Petromidia Refinery

Today Năvodari is an important chemical and industrial town featuring a car repairs factory and the Petromidia Refinery, which is the largest Romanian oil refinery and one of the largest in Eastern Europe.

Năvodari has also developed in the social and cultural fields; in the city center there is a children's town, built between 1969 and 1972, vacation accommodations, and sports facilities where up to 12,000 visitors can be accommodated.

Some 5 km (3.1 mi) from the town itself there is a summer camp (the largest one in Romania), built under the communist regime for school children. Due to its interesting programmes, good accommodation and affordable prices, it was extremely popular among teachers and parents. In the early 2000s, it was opened for the public at large as a cheap seaside resort.

CS Năvodari is an amateur football club based in the town. Founded in 1993, the club currently plays in Liga IV.

== Demographics ==
Historical population
Year	Pop.	±%
1977	9,717	—
1992	31,746	+226.7%
2002	32,400	+2.1%
2011	31,554	−2.6%
2021	34,398	+9.0%
Source: Census data

At the 2021 census, Năvodari had a population of 34,398. At the 2011 census, the town's population consisted of 29,873 ethnic Romanians (94.67%), 283 Hungarians (0.90%), 309 Roma (0.98%), 10 Germans (0.03%), 297 Turks (0.94%), 115 Tatars (0.36%), 545 Lipovans (1.73%), 27 Aromanians (0.09%), 77 others (0.24%), and 18 with undeclared ethnicity (0.06%).

== Notable natives ==
- Laurențiu Duță (b. 1976), member of the 3rei Sud Est band
- Adrian Lungu (b. 1960), Romania's most capped rugby union player
