= Steaua Stadium (2021) =

Football stadium in Bucharest

- Ghencea Stadium
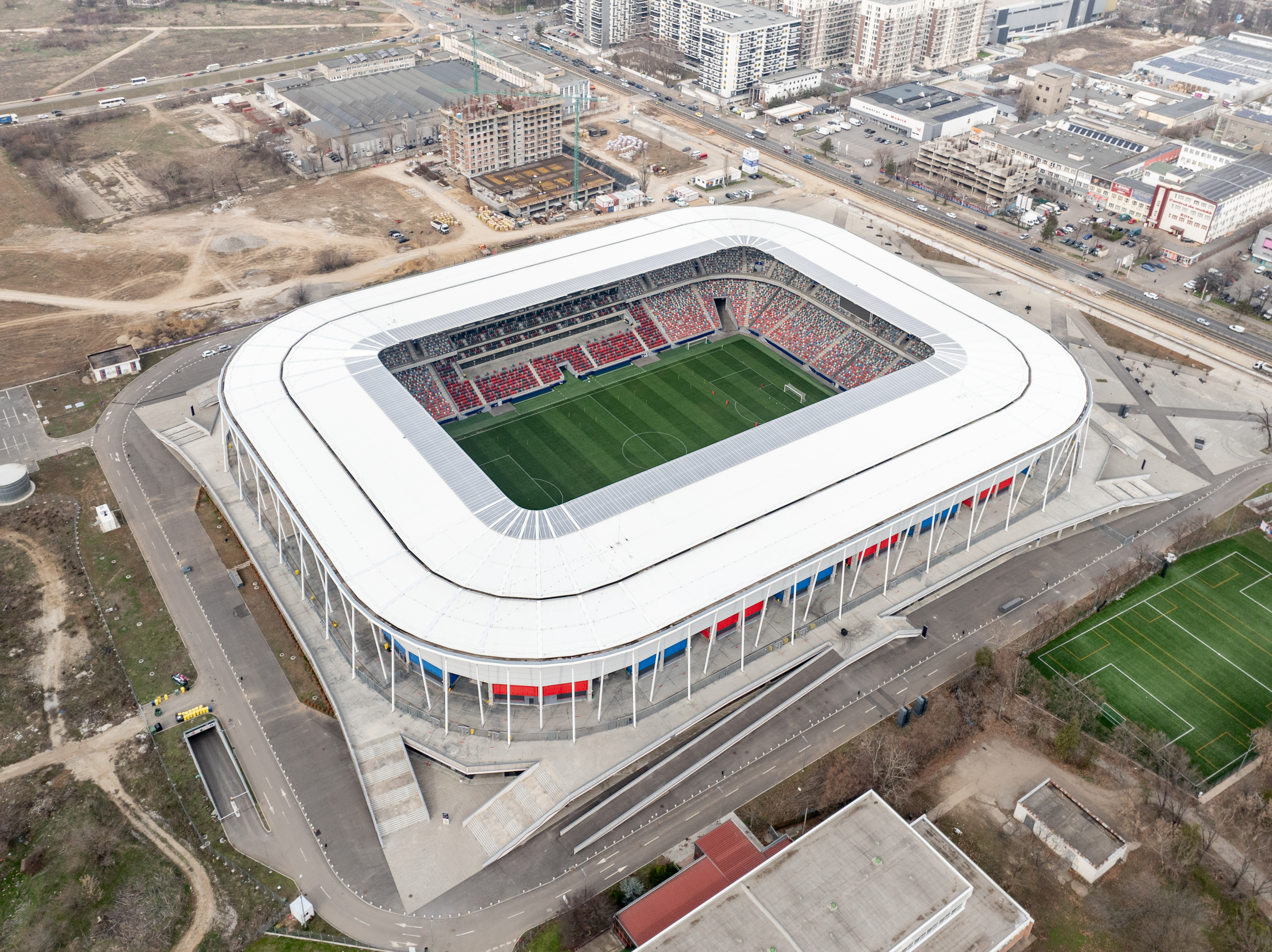
- UEFA
- Interactive map of Steaua Stadium
- Address: 45 Ghencea Boulevard, Ghencea, Sector 6
- Location: Bucharest, Romania
- Coordinates: 44°24′46″N 26°2′26″E
- Owner: Ministry of National Defence
- Operator: CSA Steaua Bucuresti
- Capacity: 31,254
- Surface: Grass
- Scoreboard: Yes
- Field size: 122m × 68m

Construction
- Groundbreaking: February 2019
- Opened: 7 July 2021
- Cost: €95 million
- Architect: Construcții Erbașu
- General contractor: Compania Națională de Investiții

Tenants
- Steaua București (football); Steaua București (rugby); Romania national football team FCSB (selected matches)

The Steaua Stadium (Romanian: Stadionul Steaua), informally also known as Ghencea Stadium, is a multi-purpose stadium in Bucharest, Romania. It primarily serves as the home stadium of CSA Steaua București and the Romania national football team, replacing the former venue.

The new stadium cost €95 million and is located in the neighbourhood of Ghencea. It seats 31,254 spectators.

== Notable events ==
The stadium was inaugurated on 7 July 2021, with a match between Steaua and OFK Beograd, the same team with whom they had inaugurated the previous stadium back in 1974. It ended with a 6–0 win for the home team, with Bogdan Chipirliu being the first player to score in the new stadium.

Austria and North Macedonia's squads were based at the stadium during preparation for and between matches at UEFA Euro 2020.

International football clubs matches
Date	Competition	Home	Away	Score	Attendance
10 August 2023	UEFA Europa Conference League	(Romania) FCSB	(Denmark) Nordsjælland	0–0	27,135
16 July 2024	UEFA Champions League	(Romania) FCSB	(San Marino) Virtus	4–0	7,262
23 July 2024	UEFA Champions League	(Romania) FCSB	(Israel) Maccabi Tel Aviv	1–1	26,235
13 August 2024	UEFA Champions League	(Romania) FCSB	(Czech Republic) Sparta Prague	2–3	28,875
29 August 2024	UEFA Europa League	(Romania) FCSB	(Austria) LASK	1–0	21,253
9 July 2025	UEFA Champions League	(Romania) FCSB	(Andorra) Inter Club d'Escaldes	3–1	13,080

== Photo gallery ==
Stadium exterior

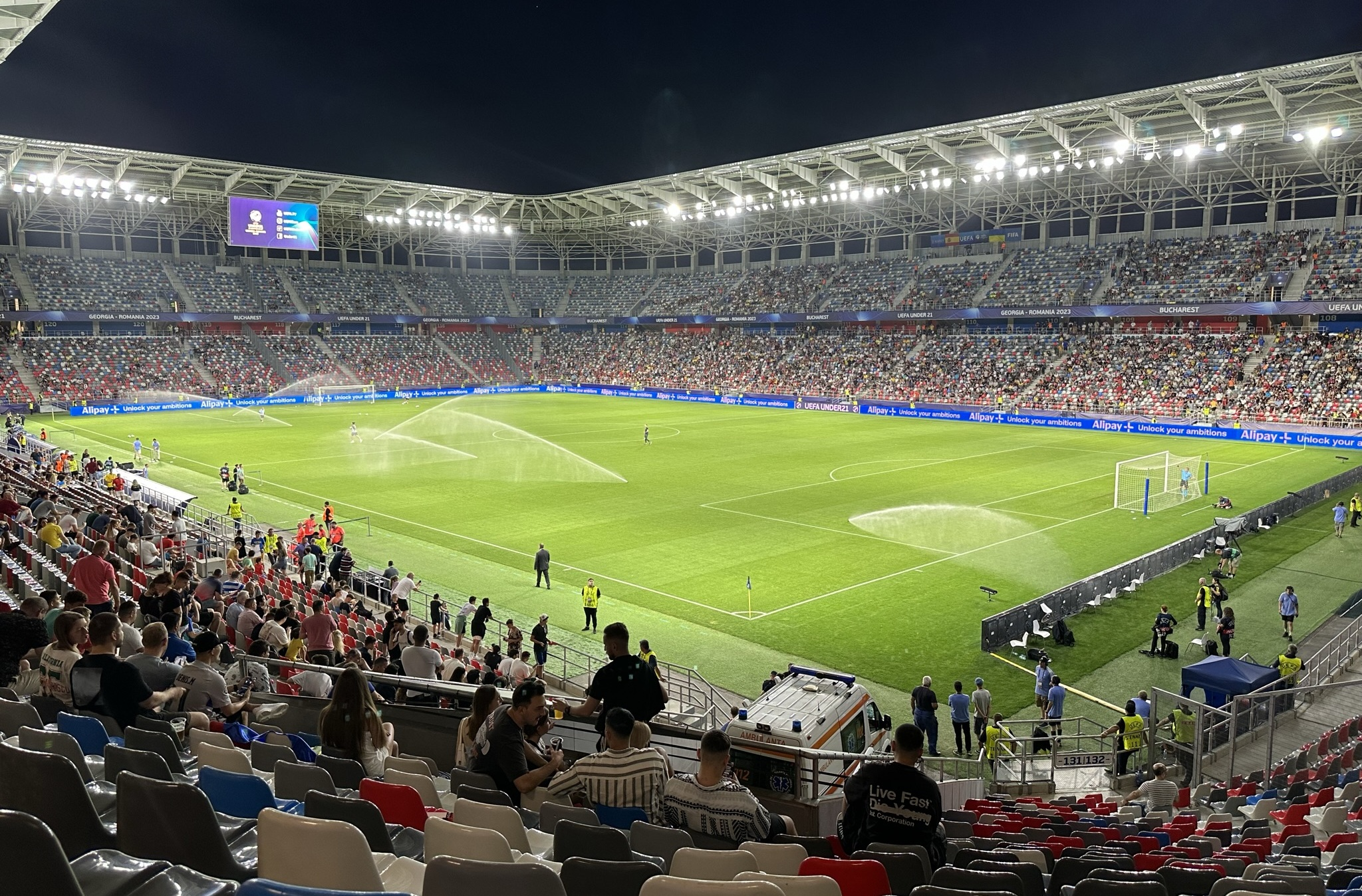
Stadionul Steaua

== See also ==
- List of football stadiums in Romania
- List of European stadia by capacity
