= Liga de Rugby Kaufland =

Romanian rugby union competition

Liga Națională de Rugby
- Current season, competition or edition: 2026 Liga de Rugby Kaufland season
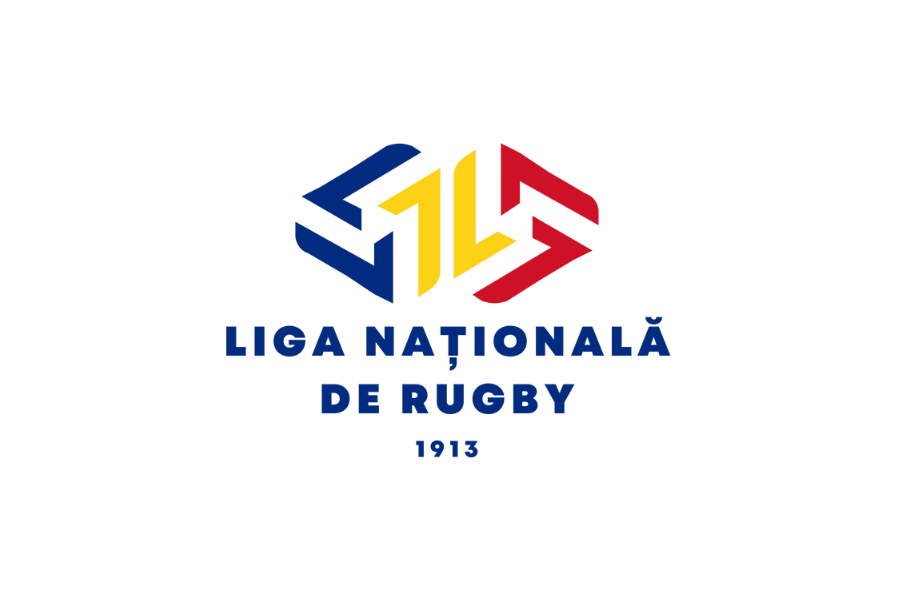
- Sport: Rugby union
- Founded: 1914; 112 years ago
- Administrator: FRR
- No. of teams: 6
- Country: Romania
- Most recent champions: Știința Baia Mare (10th title) (2025)
- Most titles: Steaua București (24 titles)
- Broadcaster: TVR Sport
- Level on pyramid: 1
- Relegation to: Divizia Națională de Seniori

The Liga Națională de Rugby (Romanian pronunciation: [ˈliɡa natsjoˈnalə de ˈruɡbi]) is a professional rugby union club competition that is played in Romania. In the 2023 season there are 14 teams competing. The competition was established in 1913 and is governed by the Romanian Rugby Federation. Steaua București is the most successful club in the competition with 24 titles.

== History ==
The first Romanian competition took place in 1914 between two Bucharest team's in Tennis Club Român and Sporting Club with Tennis Club Român taking out the first title winning both of the matches by eight and three points respectively. The competition expanded and grew in the 1920s and 1930s (with a peak in the 1970s and 1980s), after Stadiul Român and seventeen more (other) teams were founded in Bucharest-only ever since. The championship took place on an annual basis, with some gap years caused by the two World Wars mostly.

The first team set up outside Bucharest (to play the top-tier competition) was IAR Brașov in 1939, a team owned and run by the famous Braşov aircraft factory I.A.R. (Industria Aeronautică Română), but the first one to become champion of Romania was Universitatea Timișoara, only in 1972.

The European Champions Cup in its early years (1960s) used to be a Franco-Romanian affair, with RC Grivița București (1964) and Dinamo (1967) grabbing their fair share of glory. In 1995 it was Farul Constanţa the team to represent Romania in the newly born Heineken Cup (splitting with Stade Toulousain the honour of playing on home ground the first ever match of the competition), but that was to be followed by no other participation of a Romanian side ever since (as of 2020). Nonetheless, the Romanian teams turned to the European Challenge Cup although never actually advanced to the quarterfinals. To better cope with the strong clubs of the 6 Nations countries the Romanian Rugby Union pulled together an all-domestic franchise - Stejarii (The Oaks), to be later renamed Lupii București (Bucharest Wolves) - but despite the healthy idea and some gleams of success, the mighty SuperLiga clubs forced the Romanian Rugby Establishment to back off and allow again the champions of the SuperLiga to take part in the European Challenge Cup.

== Current teams ==
Locations of teams in the 2026 Liga Națională de Rugby.

Note: Flags indicate national union as has been defined under WR eligibility rules. Players may hold more than one non-WR nationality

Team	Manager	Captain	Stadium	Capacity
Steaua București	(Romania) Viorel Lucaci	(Romania) Dragoș Ser	Stadionul Steaua	31.254
Dinamo București	(New Zealand) Sosene Anesi	(Romania) Ovidiu Cojocaru	Stadionul Arcul de Triumf	8.207
RC Gura Humorului	(Romania) Andrei Varvaroi	(Romania) Mihai Dărăban	Stadionul Tineretului	3.000
Știința Baia Mare	(Romania) Eugen Apjok	(South Africa) Nicolaas Immelman	Arena Zimbrilor	2.300
CS Rapid Bucuresti	(Romania) Stelian Burcea	(Romania) Iulian Melinte	Stadionul Olimpia	2.000
Timișoara	(Romania) Mugur Preda	(Romania) Vlad Neculau	Stadionul Gheorghe Rășcanu	1.000
Universitatea Cluj	(Romania) Cristian Săuan	(Romania) Alexandru Banu	Stadionul Iuliu Hațieganu	500

=== Champions ===
Pos.	Club	Champion	Winning years
1	Steaua București	24	1949, 1953, 1954, 1961, 1963, 1964, 1971, 1973, 1974, 1977, 1979, 1980, 1981, 1983, 1984, 1985, 1987, 1988, 1989, 1992, 1999, 2003, 2005, 2006
2	Dinamo București	17	1951, 1952, 1956, 1965, 1969, 1982, 1991, 1994, 1996, 1998, 2000, 2001, 2002, 2004, 2007, 2008, 2023
3	Grivița București	12	1948, 1950, 1955, 1957, 1958, 1959, 1960, 1962, 1966, 1967, 1970, 1993
4	Știința Baia Mare	10	1990, 2009, 2010, 2011, 2014, 2019, 2020, 2021, 2022, 2025
5	Tennis Club Român București	9	1914, 1915, 1916, 1921, 1922, 1923, 1927, 1936, 1938
6	SCM Rugby Timișoara	8	1972, 2012, 2013, 2015, 2017, 2018, 2024, 2026
7	Sportul Studențesc București	7	1925, 1929, 1932, 1935, 1939, 1946, 1948
8	Stadiul Român București	7	1919, 1924, 1926, 1928, 1930, 1931, 1947
9	Farul Constanța	6	1975, 1976, 1978, 1986, 1995, 1997
10	Viforul Dacia București	4	1941, 1942, 1943, 1944
11	Poșta Telegraf Telefon București	2	1933, 1934
12	ȘEFS București	1	1920

=== Winners by year ===
- 1914 - Tennis Club Român București
- 1915 - Tennis Club Român București
- 1916 - Tennis Club Român București
- 1917 - (cancelled due to WWI)
- 1918 - (cancelled due to WWI)
- 1919 - Stadiul Român București
- 1920 - ȘEFS București
- 1921 - Tennis Club Român București
- 1922 - Tennis Club Român București
- 1923 - Tennis Club Român București
- 1924 - Stadiul Român București
- 1925 - Sportul Studențesc București
- 1926 - Stadiul Român București
- 1927 - Tennis Club Român București
- 1928 - Stadiul Român București
- 1929 - Sportul Studențesc București
- 1930 - Stadiul Român București
- 1931 - Stadiul Român București
- 1932 - Sportul Studențesc București
- 1933 - Poșta Telegraf Telefon București
- 1934 - Poșta Telegraf Telefon București
- 1935 - Sportul Studențesc București
- 1935/36 - Tennis Club Român București
- 1936/37 - (cancelled due to a tournament held in autumn of 1937)
- 1937/38 - Tennis Club Român București
- 1938/39 - Sportul Studențesc București
- 1939/40 - Tennis Club Român București
- 1940/41 - Viforul Dacia București
- 1941/42 - Viforul Dacia București
- 1942/43 - Viforul Dacia București
- 1943/44 - Viforul Dacia București
- 1944/45 - (cancelled due to WWII)
- 1945/46 - Sportul Studențesc București
- 1946/47 - Stadiul Român București
- 1947/48 - Sportul Studențesc București
- 1948 - CFR București
- 1949 - CSCA București
- 1950 - Locomotiva CFR București
- 1951 - Dinamo București
- 1952 - Dinamo București
- 1953 - CCA București
- 1954 - CCA București
- 1955 - CFR Grivița Roșie București
- 1956 - Dinamo București
- 1957 - CFR Grivița Roșie București
- 1958 - CFR Grivița Roșie București
- 1959 - CFR Grivița Roșie București
- 1960 - CFR Grivița Roșie București
- 1961 - CCA București
- 1962 - CFR Grivița Roșie București
- 1963 - Steaua București
- 1964 - Steaua București
- 1965 - Dinamo București
- 1966 - CFR Grivița Roșie București
- 1967 - CFR Grivița Roșie București
- 1968/69 - Dinamo București
- 1969/70 - CFR Grivița Roșie București
- 1970/71 - Steaua București
- 1971/72 - Universitatea Timişoara
- 1972/73 - Steaua București
- 1973/74 - Steaua București
- 1974/75 - Farul Constanța
- 1975/76 - Farul Constanța
- 1976/77 - Steaua București
- 1977/78 - Farul Constanța
- 1978/79 - Steaua București
- 1979/80 - Steaua București
- 1980/81 - Steaua București
- 1981/82 - Dinamo București
- 1982/83 - Steaua București
- 1983/84 - Steaua București
- 1984/85 - Steaua București
- 1985/86 - Farul Constanța
- 1986/87 - Steaua București
- 1987/88 - Steaua București
- 1988/89 - Steaua București
- 1989/90 - Știința CEMIN Baia Mare
- 1990/91 - Dinamo București
- 1991/92 - Steaua București
- 1992/93 - Grivița București
- 1993/94 - Dinamo București
- 1994/95 - Farul Constanța
- 1995/96 - Dinamo București
- 1996/97 - Farul Constanța
- 1997/98 - Dinamo București
- 1998/99 - Steaua București
- 1999/00 - Dinamo București
- 2000/01 - Dinamo București
- 2001/02 - Dinamo București
- 2002/03 - Steaua București
- 2003/04 - Dinamo București
- 2004/05 - Steaua București
- 2005/06 - Steaua București
- 2006/07 - Dinamo București
- 2007/08 - Dinamo București
- 2008/09 - Știința Baia Mare
- 2010 - Știința Baia Mare
- 2011 - Știința Baia Mare
- 2012 - Universitatea de Vest Timișoara
- 2013 - Universitatea de Vest Timișoara
- 2014 - Știința Baia Mare
- 2015 - Timișoara Saracens RCM UVT
- 2016/17 - Timișoara Saracens RCM UVT
- 2017/18 - Timișoara Saracens RCM UVT
- 2018/19 - Știința Baia Mare
- 2019/20 - Știința Baia Mare
- 2021 - Știința Baia Mare
- 2022 - Știința Baia Mare
- 2023 - Dinamo București
- 2024 - SCM USV Timișoara
- 2025 - Știința Baia Mare
- 2026 - SCM USV Timișoara

== See also ==
- Cupa României
- Rugby union in Romania
