= 2013–14 Corona Brașov season =

Corona Brașov
2013–14 season
- Chairman: Florin Florea
- Manager: Nicolae Manea
- Stadium: Silviu Ploeşteanu
- Highest home attendance: 6,000 vs Oţelul Galaţi (22 July 2013)
- Lowest home attendance: 3,000 vs Astra Giurgiu (4 August 2013)
| Home colours | Away colours |

The 2013–14 season was Corona Braşov's first season in Liga I, the top division of Romanian football.

== Competitions ==
=== Liga I ===
| 22 July 2013 1 | Corona Braşov | 0–1 | Oţelul Galaţi | Braşov |
| 19:00 | | | Marquinhos 74' (pen.) | Stadium: Silviu Ploeşteanu; Attendance: 6,000; Referee: George Cătălin Găman |

| 26 July 2013 2 | Ceahlăul Piatra Neamţ | 3–0 | Corona Braşov | Piatra Neamţ |
| 21:30 BST | Achim 3'; Golubović 70'; Marc 88' | | | Stadium: Ceahlăul; Attendance: 1,000; Referee: Ovidiu Haţegan |

| 4 August 2013 3 | Corona Braşov | 2–5 | Astra Giurgiu | Braşov |
| 19:00 | Stănescu 42'; Ene 48' | | Fatai 20', 33'; Budescu 27', 30'; Amorim 86' | Stadium: Silviu Ploeşteanu; Attendance: 3,000; Referee: Cristian Balaj |

| 10 August 2013 4 | Concordia Chiajna | 1–0 | Corona Braşov | Chiajna |
| 19:00 | Florea 25' (pen.) | | | Stadium: Concordia; Attendance: 2,000; Referee: Mircea Bârsan |

| 16 August 2013 5 | Corona Braşov | 1–1 | Dinamo București | Braşov |
| 21:30 | Munteanu 40' | | 7' Figueiredo | Stadium: Silviu Ploeşteanu; Attendance: 3,500; Referee: Marius Avram |

| 26 August 2013 6 | CFR Cluj | 1–0 | Corona Braşov | Cluj-Napoca |
| 19:30 | Ogbu 18' | | | Stadium: Dr. Constantin Rădulescu; Attendance: 4,000; Referee: George Cătălin Găman |

| 15 September 2013 7 | Corona Braşov | 1–2 | Gaz Metan Mediaș | Braşov |
| 17:00 | Buș 62' | | 55' Dan; 63' Tahar | Stadium: Silviu Ploeşteanu; Attendance: 500; Referee: Radu Petrescu |

| 20 September 2013 8 | Săgeata Năvodari | 1–0 | Corona Braşov | Năvodari |
| 18:00 | Florin Achim (yellow card) 25'; Vezan (yellow card) 37'; Ionuț Filip (yellow card) 39'; N'Doye (yellow card) 72'; Mera 83'; Iordache (yellow card) 90+1' | | Arce (yellow card) 17'; Dâlbea (yellow card) 71' | Stadium: Stadionul Farul; Attendance: 1,000; Referee: (Romania) Catalin Popa |

| 29 September 2013 9 | Corona Braşov | 1–2 | FC Botoșani | Braşov |
| 16:00 | Rodríguez (yellow card) 12'; Wanderson 25'; Vranjković (yellow card) 73'; Olariu (yellow card) 87' | | Hadnagy 42', 56'; Patache (yellow card) 65' | Stadium: Silviu Ploeşteanu; Attendance: 300; Referee: (Romania) Ovidiu Hațegan |

| 4 October 2013 10 | ACS Poli Timișoara | 0–0 | Corona Braşov | Timișoara |
| 20:30 | Belu-Iordache (yellow card) 26'; Keita (yellow card) 87' | | Wanderson (yellow card) 25'; Buș (yellow card) 40'; Marius Burlacu (yellow card) 68'; Neacșa (yellow card) 78' (yellow-red card); Marc (yellow card) 90+2' | Stadium: Stadionul Dan Păltinișanu; Attendance: 300; Referee: (Romania) Florin Miron |

==== Results summary ====
| Overall | | | | | | | | Home | | | | | | Away | | | | | |
| Pld | W | D | L | GF | GA | GD | Pts | W | D | L | GF | GA | GD | W | D | L | GF | GA | GD |
|---|---|---|---|---|---|---|---|---|---|---|---|---|---|---|---|---|---|---|---|
| 8 | 0 | 1 | 7 | 4 | 14 | −10 | 1 | 0 | 1 | 4 | 4 | 9 | −5 | 0 | 0 | 3 | 0 | 5 | −5 |

Last updated: 12 August 2013.

==== Results by round ====
| Round | 1 | 2 | 3 | 4 | 5 | 6 | 7 | 8 | 9 | 10 | 11 | 12 | 13 | 14 | 15 | 16 | 17 | 18 | 19 | 20 | 21 | 22 | 23 | 24 | 25 | 26 | 27 | 28 | 29 | 30 | 31 | 32 | 33 | 34 | 35 | 36 | 37 | 38 |
|---|---|---|---|---|---|---|---|---|---|---|---|---|---|---|---|---|---|---|---|---|---|---|---|---|---|---|---|---|---|---|---|---|---|---|---|---|---|---|
| Ground | H | A | H | A | H | A | H | A | H | A | H | A | H | H | A | H | A | A | A | H | H | A | H | A | A | A | H | H | A | H | A | H | A | H | H | A | H | A |
| Result | L | L | L | L | D | L | L | | | | | | | | | | | | | | | | | | | | | | | | | | | | | | | |
| Position | 13 | 16 | 17 | 18 | 18 | 17 | 18 | | | | | | | | | | | | | | | | | | | | | | | | | | | | | | | |

Updated to match(es) played on 17 September 2013. Source:
A = Away; H = Home; W = Win; D = Draw; L = Loss

== Squad statistics ==
=== Appearances and goals ===
| No. | Pos | Nat | Player | Total | | Liga I | | Cupa României | |
| No. | Pos | Nat | Player | Apps | Goals | Apps | Goals | Apps | Goals |
|---|---|---|---|---|---|---|---|---|---|
| 1 | GK | (Romania) ROU | Alexandru Marc | 4 | 0 | 4+0 | 0 | 0+0 | 0 |
| 2 | DF | (Uruguay) URU | Nicolás Rodriguez | 0 | 0 | 0+0 | 0 | 0+0 | 0 |
| 3 | DF | (Ivory Coast) CIV | Wilfried Kanon | 4 | 0 | 4+0 | 0 | 0+0 | 0 |
| 4 | DF | (Romania) ROU | Marius Burlacu | 2 | 0 | 2+0 | 0 | 0+0 | 0 |
| 5 | MF | (Romania) ROU | Raphael Stănescu | 3 | 1 | 2+1 | 1 | 0+0 | 0 |
| 6 | DF | (Romania) ROU | Rareş Forika | 3 | 0 | 3+0 | 0 | 0+0 | 0 |
| 7 | MF | (Romania) ROU | Alexandru Neacșa | 2 | 0 | 2+0 | 0 | 0+0 | 0 |
| 8 | MF | (Romania) ROU | Răzvan Dâlbea | 2 | 0 | 2+0 | 0 | 0+0 | 0 |
| 9 | FW | (Romania) ROU | Ion Coman | 3 | 0 | 3+0 | 0 | 0+0 | 0 |
| 10 | MF | (Romania) ROU | Vasile Olariu | 2 | 0 | 2+0 | 0 | 0+0 | 0 |
| 11 | MF | (Romania) ROU | Florin Manea | 1 | 0 | 0+1 | 0 | 0+0 | 0 |
| 12 | GK | (Romania) ROU | Remus Dănălache | 0 | 0 | 0+0 | 0 | 0+0 | 0 |
| 13 | MF | (Uruguay) URU | Giorginho Aguirre | 0 | 0 | 0+0 | 0 | 0+0 | 0 |
| 14 | MF | (Romania) ROU | Florin Stângă | 2 | 0 | 1+1 | 0 | 0+0 | 0 |
| 15 | DF | (Romania) ROU | Răzvan Damian | 3 | 0 | 3+0 | 0 | 0+0 | 0 |
| 16 | MF | (Romania) ROU | Cristian Marcăș | 0 | 0 | 0+0 | 0 | 0+0 | 0 |
| 17 | MF | (Romania) ROU | Horia Popa | 1 | 0 | 0+1 | 0 | 0+0 | 0 |
| 18 | FW | (Portugal) POR | Luís Lourenço | 1 | 0 | 1+0 | 0 | 0+0 | 0 |
| 19 | FW | (Romania) ROU | Sergiu Buș | 2 | 0 | 1+1 | 0 | 0+0 | 0 |
| 20 | MF | (Romania) ROU | Vlad Munteanu | 3 | 0 | 2+1 | 0 | 0+0 | 0 |
| 21 | MF | (Romania) ROU | Mihai Stere | 2 | 0 | 1+1 | 0 | 0+0 | 0 |
| 22 | FW | (Romania) ROU | Jaime Bragança | 1 | 0 | 1+0 | 0 | 0+0 | 0 |
| 23 | DF | (Colombia) COL | Óscar Arce | 3 | 0 | 3+0 | 0 | 0+0 | 0 |
| 24 | MF | (Romania) ROU | Marius Pastor | 2 | 0 | 2+0 | 0 | 0+0 | 0 |
| 25 | DF | (Romania) ROU | Florin Ilie | 3 | 0 | 2+1 | 0 | 0+0 | 0 |
| 26 | DF | (Romania) ROU | Marius Martac | 1 | 0 | 1+0 | 0 | 0+0 | 0 |
| 26 | DF | (Romania) ROU | Bogdan Dumitru | 0 | 0 | 0+0 | 0 | 0+0 | 0 |
| 27 | MF | (Romania) ROU | Ionuț Chirciu | 3 | 0 | 1+2 | 0 | 0+0 | 0 |
| 28 | GK | (Italy) ITA | Remo Amadio | 0 | 0 | 0+0 | 0 | 0+0 | 0 |
| 30 | FW | (Romania) ROU | Marius Ene | 3 | 1 | 1+2 | 1 | 0+0 | 0 |
