= Radu Leonte =

Romanian professional footballer

Personal information
- Full name: Radu Traian Leonte
- Date of birth: 16 June 1991 (age 35)
- Place of birth: Brașov, Romania
- Height: 1.86 m (6 ft 1 in)
- Position: Midfielder

Team information
- Current team: Cetate Râșnov
- Number: 4

Youth career
- Forex Brașov

Senior career*
Years	Team	Apps	(Gls)
2008–2011	Forex Brașov	5	(5)
2011–2014	Corona Brașov	32	(2)
2013	→ Păpăuți (loan)		
2014–2016	Baia Mare	13	(1)
2016–2017	AFC Hărman	22	(0)
2017–2018	Cetate Râșnov	24	(2)
2018	SR Brașov	10	(1)
2019	AFC Hărman	14	(1)
2019–2021	Corona Brașov	33	(2)
2021–2023	FC Brașov	19	(0)
2023–	Cetate Râșnov	31	(0)
- * Club domestic league appearances and goals as of 09:25, 28 December 2024 (UTC)

Radu Traian Leonte (born 16 June 1991) is a Romanian professional footballer who plays as a midfielder for Liga III side Olimpic Cetate Râșnov. In his career, Leonte also played for teams such as Forex Brașov, FCM Baia Mare, Olimpic Cetate Râșnov or Corona Brașov.

== Honours ==
Forex Brașov

- Liga IV: 2010–11

Corona Brașov

- Liga II: 2012–13
- Liga III: 2011–12, 2020–21
- Liga IV: 2019–20

Baia Mare

- Liga III: 2014–15
