= Daniel Bona =

Romanian professional footballer

Personal information
- Date of birth: 1 June 1969 (age 57)
- Place of birth: Hunedoara, Romania
- Height: 1.87 m (6 ft 2 in)
- Positions: Midfielder; forward

Team information
- Current team: SR Brașov (assistant)

Youth career
- 1979–1989: Corvinul Hunedoara

Senior career*
Years	Team	Apps	(Gls)
1989–1993	Rapid Miercurea Ciuc		
1993	Tractorul Brașov	10	(3)
1994	Corvinul Hunedoara		
1994–1996	Metrom Brașov	28	(1)
1996–2000	Precizia Săcele	79	(39)
Total		117	(43)

Managerial career
- 2000–2004: Precizia Săcele (youth)
- 2003–2006: Precizia Săcele
- 2006–2008: Unirea Tărlungeni
- 2008–2013: Corona Brașov
- 2013–2014: Corona Brașov (assistant)
- 2014: Corona Brașov (caretaker)
- 2014–2016: Unirea Tărlungeni
- 2016–2018: Olimpic Cetate Râșnov
- 2018–2019: AFC Hărman
- 2019: AFC Hărman
- 2020–2023: SR Brașov (assistant)
- 2023–2024: Săcele
- 2025–: SR Brașov (assistant)
- 2025–: Unirea DMO Hațeg
- * Club domestic league appearances and goals as of 18:31, 12 August 2025 (UTC)

Daniel Bona (born 1 June 1969) is a Romanian former footballer and currently the assistant manager of Liga III side SR Brașov.

In his career, as a footballer, Daniel Bona played for teams such as Tractorul Brașov, Corvinul Hunedoara, Metrom Brașov and Precizia Săcele. As a manager, Bona is well known in Romania for his performances as the manager of teams based in Brașov County, especially for the period spent at Corona Brașov.

== Playing career ==
Daniel Bona was born in Hunedoara and grew up in the academy of Corvinul Hunedoara, academy that produced over time many important players, such as Remus Vlad, Michael Klein, Ioan Andone, Romulus Gabor, Dorin Mateuț, Mircea Rednic or Bogdan Lobonț, among others. After a period spent at Rapid Miercurea Ciuc, Bona made his debut at Divizia B in 1993, for Tractorul Brașov.

In 1994, he moved back to Corvinul Hunedoara, but after half of season Daniel return to Brașov County, where he spent the rest of his career, at teams such as Metrom Brașov and Precizia Săcele.

At Precizia Săcele, Bona changed its position in the squad, from midfielder to forward and had some great seasons with the "red and blacks", winning the top scorer trophy for Divizia B, at the end of the 1997–98 edition. Also, at the end of the 1996–97 season he was ranked 2nd in the goalscorers table, after Claudiu Niculescu. Bona's career ended suddenly in 2000, after a severe injury, so he never got to play in the top-flight.

== Manager career ==
Daniel Bona started his football manager career at the Precizia Săcele Academy, in 2000, then in 2003 he was promoted as the manager of the first squad, Divizia B side at that time. Bona maintained Precizia in the second league after they were ranked 11th, 10th and 6th, but in 2006 he accepted a contract from 4th league club Unirea Tărlungeni.

Bona achieved a promotion to Liga III, with the team near Brașov, subsequently signing a contract with Corona Brașov, 5th tier club at that time. The period spent by Bona at Corona remains memorable for his career, Corona promoted from the Liga V to Liga I, within 5 years. After promotion, Bona was named assistant coach, but returned as the manager of the team in May 2014, then managing the squad in the top-flight for almost a month, until their relegation.

Bona returned to Unirea Tărlungeni in the summer of 2014 and had notable results, maintaining the small club, at the level of the second tier. In 2016, he moved to Olimpic Cetate Râșnov (3rd tier club), then in 2018 to AFC Hărman (3rd tier).

== Honours ==
=== Manager ===
Unirea Tărlungeni

- Liga IV Brașov: Winner (1) 2006–07

Corona Brașov

- Liga II: Winner (1) 2012–13
- Liga III: Winner (1) 2011–12
- Liga IV – Brașov County: Winner (1) 2009–10
- Liga V – Brașov County: Winner (1) 2008–09

=== Other performances ===
Precizia Săcele

- Divizia B: Top scorer 1997–98
