= Florin Dumbravă =

Romanian footballer (born 1995)

Personal information
- Full name: Florin Daniel Dumbravă
- Date of birth: 19 February 1995 (age 31)
- Place of birth: Brașov, Romania
- Height: 1.76 m (5 ft 9 in)
- Position: Defender

Youth career
- –2012: FC Brașov

Senior career*
| Years | Team | Apps | (Gls) |
| 2013–2016 | FC Brașov | 1 | (0) |
| 2013–2014 | → Unirea Tărlungeni (loan) | 13 | (0) |
| 2016–2018 | Sepsi OSK | 30 | (0) |
| 2018 | ACS Poli Timișoara | 2 | (0) |
| 2018–2019 | SR Brașov | 7 | (1) |
| 2019–2021 | Corona Brașov | 27 | (0) |
| 2021–2023 | FC Brașov | 50 | (2) |
| 2023–2025 | Concordia Chiajna | 20 | (0) |
- * Club domestic league appearances and goals as of 7 December 2024

Florin Daniel Dumbravă (born 19 February 1995) is a Romanian professional footballer who plays as a defender.

== Honours ==
Corona Brașov

- Liga III: 2020–21
- Liga IV – Brașov County: 2019–20
