= 2013–14 Liga I =

96th season of top-tier football league in Romania

Liga I
- Season: 2013–14
- Champions: Steaua București
- Relegated: Vaslui; Poli Timișoara; Săgeata Năvodari; Corona Brașov
- Champions League: Steaua București
- Europa League: Astra Giurgiu; Petrolul Ploiești; CFR Cluj
- Matches: 306
- Goals: 727 (2.38 per match)
- Top goalscorer: Liviu Antal (14)
- Biggest home win: Vaslui 8–1 Corona
- Biggest away win: Concordia 1–5 Pandurii; Viitorul 0–4 Astra; Corona 0–4 Viitorul; Săgeata 0–4 Pandurii; Oțelul 0–4 Astra
- Highest scoring: Vaslui 8–1 Corona
- Longest winning run: Steaua (6)
- Longest unbeaten run: Steaua (26)
- Longest winless run: Universitatea (12)
- Longest losing run: Botoșani (6)
- Highest attendance: Steaua 2–2 Oțelul (30,000)
- Lowest attendance: Corona 0–0 Poli (100)
- Total attendance: 1,774,800
- Average attendance: 5,800

The 2013–14 Liga I is the ninety-sixth season of Liga I, the top-level football league of Romania. The season began on 19 July 2013 and ended on 21 May 2014. Steaua București are the defending champions.

Since Romania climbed from 22nd to 18th place in the UEFA association coefficient rankings at the end of the 2012–13 season, the winners of the 2013–14 Cupa României will start in the third qualifying round of the Europa League instead of second qualifying round. The champions will still enter the second qualifying round of the 2014–15 UEFA Champions League, the second-placed team will still enter the second qualifying round of the 2014–15 UEFA Europa League, but third-placed team will enter the second qualifying round instead of first qualifying round.

== Teams ==
The last four teams from the 2012–13 season were initially relegated to their respective 2013–14 Liga II division. Gloria Bistrița, Turnu Severin and CSM Studențesc Iași were relegated after just one season in the top flight, while Concordia Chiajna were to return to Liga II after two years.

Additionally, two other teams were also relegated because they failed to obtain a licence for the 2013–14 Liga I season: Rapid București and Universitatea Cluj. However, on 5 July 2013, the International Court of Arbitration for Sport upheld the appeal of Universitatea Cluj and therefore decided that they could remain in Liga I. Also, the Romanian Football Federation announced a play-off game between Rapid Bucharest and Concordia Chiajna for the 18th place in the 2013–14 season. The play-off was played on 13 July 2013 and won by Rapid, with 2–1, after extra-time. The FRF decision was contested by Concordia at the CAS. On 2 August, CAS decided that Concordia Chiajna should play in Liga I and Rapid was relegated to the second division. The results of the matches played by Rapid in the first two rounds of the season, with Viitorul and Vaslui, were canceled.

The first two teams from each of the two divisions of 2012–13 Liga II advanced to Liga I. FC Botoșani promoted as the winners of Seria I. It is their first season in Liga I and the first time ever a team from Botoșani County is playing in the first league. The other three teams are also for the first time in Liga I: Săgeata Năvodari, second place in Seria I, Corona Brașov and Poli Timișoara from Seria II. While ACS Poli Timișoara is considered to be the successor of FC Politehnica Timișoara, the club was formed by moving ACS Recaș to Timișoara in the summer of 2012.

This is the first season since 1952 with only two teams from Bucharest.

=== Season incidents ===
Between the rounds 10 and 14, FC Vaslui was penalized with an eight points deduction because of debts owed to agent Codoban Tătar Ionel. The decision was reverted by the Appeal commission of the Romanian Football Federation on 8 November 2013.

=== Venues ===
Poli Timișoara	Universitatea Cluj	Steaua București	CFR Cluj
Dan Păltinișanu	Cluj Arena	Steaua	Dr. Constantin Rădulescu
Capacity: 32,972	Capacity: 30,201	Capacity: 28,365	Capacity: 23,500
Ceahlăul Piatra Neamț	Săgeata Năvodari (Note: Săgeata Năvodari was relocated to Farul Stadium from Constanța for this season, because Flacăra Stadium from Năvodari didn't meet the licensing rules.)	Petrolul Ploiești	Dinamo București
Ceahlăul	Farul	Ilie Oană	Dinamo
Capacity: 18,000	Capacity: 15,520	Capacity: 15,073	Capacity: 15,032
Oțelul Galați	2013–14 Liga I (Romania) Location of Bucharest teams.		FC Vaslui
Oțelul	2013–14 Liga I (Romania) Location of Bucharest teams.		Municipal
Capacity: 13,500	2013–14 Liga I (Romania) Location of Bucharest teams.		Capacity: 9,240
Pandurii Târgu Jiu	2013–14 Liga I (Romania) Location of Bucharest teams.		FC Brașov
Tudor Vladimirescu	2013–14 Liga I (Romania) Location of Bucharest teams.		Silviu Ploeșteanu
Capacity: 9,200	2013–14 Liga I (Romania) Location of Bucharest teams.		Capacity: 8,800
Corona Brașov	2013–14 Liga I (Romania) Location of Bucharest teams.		Astra Giurgiu
Silviu Ploeșteanu	2013–14 Liga I (Romania) Location of Bucharest teams.		Marin Anastasovici
Capacity: 8,800	2013–14 Liga I (Romania) Location of Bucharest teams.		Capacity: 8,500
Gaz Metan Mediaș	FC Botoșani	Concordia Chiajna	Viitorul Constanța (Note: Viitorul was relocated to Concordia Stadium from Chiajna for this season, because Orășenesc Stadium from Ovidiu didn't meet the licensing rules.)
Gaz Metan	Municipal	Concordia	Concordia
Capacity: 7,814	Capacity: 7,782	Capacity: 5,123	Capacity: 5,123

=== Personnel and kits ===
Note: Flags indicate national team as has been defined under FIFA eligibility rules. Players and Managers may hold more than one non-FIFA nationality.

Team	Manager	Captain	Kit manufacturer	Shirt sponsor
Astra Giurgiu	(Romania) Daniel Isăilă	(Romania) Andrei Mureșan	Puma	InterAgro
Brașov	(Romania) Cornel Țălnar	(Romania) Cristian Ionescu	Puma	Roman
Botoșani	(Romania) Leontin Grozavu	(Romania) Ciprian Dinu	Legea	Elsaco
Ceahlăul Piatra Neamț	(Romania) Marin Barbu	(Bosnia and Herzegovina) Bojan Golubović	Masita	SuperBet
CFR Cluj	(Romania) Vasile Miriuță	(Portugal) Ricardo Cadú	Joma	Look TV
Concordia Chiajna	(Romania) Marius Șumudică	(Romania) Cristian Melinte	Masita	—
Corona Brașov	(Romania) Dan Bona	(Romania) Ion Coman	Uhlsport	Sanohepatic
Dinamo București	(Romania) Flavius Stoican	(Romania) Cosmin Matei	Nike	Orange
Gaz Metan Mediaș	(Romania) Cristian Dulca	(Romania) Cristian Todea	Joma	RomGaz
Oțelul Galați	(Germany) Ewald Lienen	(Romania) Gabriel Giurgiu	Masita	Astra Asigurări
Pandurii Târgu Jiu	(Romania) Petre Grigoraș	(Cyprus) Paraskevas Christou	Erreà	CEO
Petrolul Ploiești	(Romania) Răzvan Lucescu	(Romania) Adrian Mutu	Puma	Opel
Poli Timișoara	(Romania) Dan Alexa	(Romania) Ovidiu Petre	Macron	—
Săgeata Năvodari	(Romania) Cătălin Anghel	(Senegal) Ousmane N'Doye	Nike	Primăria Năvodari
Steaua București	(Romania) Laurențiu Reghecampf	(Romania) Mihai Pintilii	Nike	City Insurance
Universitatea Cluj	(Romania) Mihai Teja	(Romania) Zsolt Szilágyi	Nike	—
Vaslui	(Romania) Florin Bularda	(Zimbabwe) Mike Temwanjera	Adidas	New Holland Agriculture
Viitorul Constanța	(Romania) Bogdan Vintilă	(Romania) Nicolae Dică	Puma	—

=== Managerial changes ===
Team	Outgoing manager	Manner of departure	Date of vacancy	Position in table	Incoming manager	Date of appointment
Dinamo București	(Romania) Cornel Țălnar	Sacked	29 May 2013	Pre-season	(Romania) Gheorghe Mulțescu	5 June 2013
Ceahlăul Piatra Neamț	(Romania) Viorel Hizo	End of tenure as a caretaker	30 May 2013	Pre-season	(Romania) Vasile Miriuță	6 June 2013
Concordia Chiajna	(Romania) Ilie Stan	Mutual agreement	2 June 2013	Pre-season	(Romania) Ionuț Chirilă	2 June 2013
Gaz Metan Mediaș	(Romania) Gheorghe Mulțescu	Resigned	5 June 2013	Pre-season	(Romania) Cristian Dulca	18 June 2013
Oțelul Galați	(Romania) Petre Grigoraș	Resigned	5 June 2013	Pre-season	(Romania) Ionuț Badea	28 June 2013
Săgeata Năvodari	(Romania) Mihai Guliu	No PRO licence	6 June 2013	Pre-season	(Romania) Tibor Selymes	16 June 2013
CFR Cluj	(Romania) Eugen Trică	End of tenure as a caretaker	14 June 2013	Pre-season	(Romania) Mircea Rednic	14 June 2013
Vaslui	(Romania) Gavril Balint	Resigned	16 June 2013	Pre-season	(Romania) Ilie Stan	20 June 2013
Corona Brașov	(Romania) Aurel Țicleanu	End of contract	20 June 2013	Pre-season	(Romania) Nicolae Manea	20 June 2013
Vaslui	(Romania) Ilie Stan	Resigned	2 August 2013	16	(Romania) Ionuț Moșteanu (caretaker)	2 August 2013
CFR Cluj	(Romania) Mircea Rednic	Mutual agreement	10 August 2013	8	(Romania) Petre Grigoraș	10 August 2013
Brașov	(Romania) Adrian Szabo	Sacked	18 August 2013	15	(Romania) Aurel Țicleanu	18 August 2013
Viitorul Constanța	(Romania) Cătălin Anghel	Resigned	30 August 2013	16	(Romania) Bogdan Vintilă	12 September 2013
Corona Brașov	(Romania) Nicolae Manea	Promoted as president	3 September 2013	18	(Romania) Ionel Gane	3 September 2013
Brașov	(Romania) Aurel Țicleanu	Sacked	21 September 2013	14	(Romania) Alexandru Pelici	23 September 2013
Dinamo București	(Romania) Gheorghe Mulțescu	Mutual agreement	22 September 2013	10	(Romania) Flavius Stoican	22 September 2013
Universitatea Cluj	(Romania) Ionel Ganea	Sacked	29 September 2013	17	(Romania) Gheorghe Barbu (caretaker)	29 September 2013
Vaslui	(Romania) Ionuț Moșteanu	End of tenure as a caretaker	8 October 2013	17	(Romania) Liviu Ciobotariu	8 October 2013
Poli Timișoara	(Romania) Valentin Velcea	Sacked	10 October 2013	10	(Romania) Aurel Șunda	10 October 2013
Universitatea Cluj	(Romania) Gheorghe Barbu	End of tenure as a caretaker	22 October 2013	17	(Romania) Mihai Teja	23 Oktober 2013
Oțelul Galați	(Romania) Ionuț Badea	Sacked	28 October 2013	13	(Romania) Constantin Schumacher (caretaker)	29 October 2013
Brașov	(Romania) Alexandru Pelici	Resigned	4 November 2013	14	(Romania) Ilie Stan	6 November 2013
Oțelul Galați	(Romania) Constantin Schumacher	End of tenure as caretaker	5 November 2013	13	(Germany) Ewald Lienen	5 November 2013
Botoșani	(Romania) Cristian Popovici	Sacked	2 December 2013	12	(Romania) Valeriu Bordeanu (caretaker)	2 December 2013
Săgeata Năvodari	(Romania) Tibor Selymes	Sacked	10 December 2013	15	(Romania) Gheorghe Butoiu (caretaker)	10 December 2013
Săgeata Năvodari	(Romania) Gheorghe Butoiu	End of tenure as caretaker	20 December 2013	13	(Romania) Cătălin Anghel	20 December 2013
CFR Cluj	(Romania) Petre Grigoraș	Sacked	23 December 2013	7	(Romania) Vasile Miriuță	23 December 2013
Ceahlăul Piatra Neamț	(Romania) Vasile Miriuță	Signed by CFR Cluj	23 December 2013	9	(Romania) Constantin Ilie	30 December 2013
Botoșani	(Romania) Valeriu Bordeanu (caretaker)	Sacked	5 January 2014	12	(Romania) Leontin Grozavu	5 January 2014
Brașov	(Romania) Ilie Stan	Mutual agreement	16 January 2014	16	(Romania) Cornel Țălnar	16 January 2014
Petrolul Ploiești	(Romania) Cosmin Contra	Signed by (Spain) Getafe	10 March 2014	3	(Romania) Răzvan Lucescu	11 March 2014
Concordia Chiajna	(Romania) Ionuț Chirilă	Sacked	12 March 2014	10	(Romania) Marius Șumudică	12 March 2014
Poli Timișoara	(Romania) Aurel Șunda	Sacked	17 March 2014	12	(Romania) Dan Alexa	17 March 2014
Astra Giurgiu	(Romania) Daniel Isăilă	Resigned	22 March 2014	2	(Romania) Florin Marin	22 March 2014
Ceahlăul Piatra Neamț	(Romania) Constantin Ilie	Sacked	9 April 2014	11	(Romania) Marian Bondrea	9 April 2014
Corona Brașov	(Romania) Ionel Gane	Sacked	14 April 2014	18	(Romania) Adrian Hârlab	14 April 2014
Pandurii Târgu Jiu	(Romania) Cristian Pustai	Resigned	23 April 2014	6	(Romania) Petre Grigoraș	25 April 2014
Vaslui	(Romania) Liviu Ciobotariu	Resigned	24 April 2014	5	(Romania) Costinel Botez (caretaker)	24 April 2014
Ceahlăul Piatra Neamț	(Romania) Marian Bondrea	Sacked	29 April 2014	13	(Romania) Marin Barbu	29 April 2014
Vaslui	(Romania) Costinel Botez	End of tenure as caretaker	30 April 2014	5	(Romania) Florin Bularda	30 April 2014
Corona Brașov	(Romania) Adrian Hârlab	Resigned	4 May 2014	18	(Romania) Dan Bona	4 May 2014
Astra Giurgiu	(Romania) Florin Marin	Resigned	8 May 2014	3	(Romania) Daniel Isăilă	8 May 2014

== League table ==
Pos	Team	Pld	W	D	L	GF	GA	GD	Pts	Qualification or relegation
1	Steaua București (C)	34	22	11	1	71	20	+51	77	Qualification to Champions League second qualifying round
2	Astra Giurgiu	34	22	6	6	70	28	+42	72	Qualification to Europa League third qualifying round
3	Petrolul Ploiești	34	18	14	2	53	20	+33	68	Qualification to Europa League second qualifying round
4	Dinamo București	34	17	8	9	52	34	+18	59	(Note: Vaslui did not receive a license for financial reasons. Dinamo București filed for insolvency, thus didn't get an UEFA licence. CFR Cluj got their Europa League spot.)
5	CFR Cluj	34	13	12	9	44	33	+11	51	Qualification to Europa League second qualifying round
6	Vaslui (R)	34	15	6	13	38	32	+6	51	Relegation to Liga IV
7	Pandurii Târgu Jiu	34	14	8	12	59	39	+20	50	
8	Botoșani	34	12	7	15	36	52	−16	43	
9	Ceahlăul Piatra Neamț	34	10	11	13	27	31	−4	41 (Note: OȚE 0-1 CEA; CEA 2-0 OȚE)	
10	Oțelul Galați	34	12	5	17	43	52	−9	41	
11	Universitatea Cluj	34	11	7	16	29	46	−17	40 (Note: UCL 3-1 VII; VII 1-0 UCL)	
12	Viitorul Constanța	34	10	10	14	29	50	−21	40	
13	Gaz Metan Mediaș	34	10	9	15	32	38	−6	39 (Note: GAZ 1-0 CON; CON 1-0 GAZ)	
14	Concordia Chiajna	34	10	9	15	34	47	−13	39	
15	Brașov	34	9	11	14	32	40	−8	38 (Note: BRA: 8 pts; ACS: 4 pts; SĂG: 3 pts)	Spared from relegation
16	ACS Poli Timișoara (R)	34	10	8	16	26	42	−16	38	Relegation to Liga II
17	Săgeata Năvodari (R)	34	10	8	16	32	54	−22	38	Relegation to Liga II
18	Corona Brașov (R)	34	2	8	24	20	69	−49	14	Relegation to Liga II

Source: Liga I (in Romanian)
Rules for classification: 1) points; 2) goal difference; 3) number of goals scored.
(C) Champions; (R) Relegated

== Results ==
Home \ Away	ACS	AST	BRA	BOT	CEA	CFR	CON	COR	DIN	GAZ	OȚE	PAN	PET	SĂG	STE	UCL	VAS	VII
ACS Poli Timișoara		1–2	0–1	0–1	1–1	1–0	1–0	0–0	2–0	2–1	1–0	2–3	0–3	1–1	0–0	1–2	0–2	0–0
Astra Giurgiu	5–1		3–0	5–0	0–0	1–0	1–0	3–0	2–1	3–1	1–1	2–0	1–2	2–0	1–1	3–1	1–0	2–0
Brașov	2–1	2–1		1–2	1–0	0–0	3–1	1–0	2–0	0–0	1–3	3–5	1–1	1–1	1–2	0–0	1–1	4–0
Botoșani	1–0	0–2	2–1		0–1	0–0	0–2	3–1	1–2	2–2	3–1	3–2	1–2	1–1	1–2	1–1	1–0	3–1
Ceahlăul Piatra Neamț	1–0	0–2	1–1	0–0		0–1	3–1	3–0	0–1	0–1	2–0	1–0	0–0	2–1	0–2	1–1	2–0	0–0
CFR Cluj	2–2	0–0	1–0	3–1	2–0		1–1	1–0	1–0	3–1	7–2	1–1	1–1	6–1	0–1	1–2	0–0	2–1
Concordia Chiajna	2–1	3–1	1–0	1–1	2–0	0–0		1–0	1–3	1–0	1–1	1–5	0–0	4–0	1–4	1–1	0–1	1–2
Corona Brașov	0–0	2–5	1–2	1–2	1–0	2–2	2–2		1–1	1–2	0–1	1–1	0–3	0–0	1–1	0–2	2–1	0–4
Dinamo București	4–0	2–0	2–1	1–0	1–1	0–3	2–1	1–0		1–0	3–1	2–3	1–1	4–1	1–2	6–0	2–0	1–2
Gaz Metan Mediaș	0–1	0–0	1–1	1–2	3–1	2–0	1–0	1–0	1–1		0–2	0–1	1–0	1–2	2–2	2–1	1–1	4–0
Oțelul Galați	1–0	0–4	1–0	2–1	0–1	0–1	2–0	2–1	1–2	1–1		1–0	1–2	0–1	1–1	2–1	1–2	4–1
Pandurii Târgu Jiu	0–1	1–3	3–1	6–1	1–1	0–1	0–1	5–0	2–1	1–2	2–1		0–1	0–0	1–1	3–0	1–2	1–1
Petrolul Ploiești	0–0	1–1	0–0	3–0	1–1	3–2	3–0	2–0	2–2	2–0	2–0	1–1		3–0	0–0	2–0	3–0	3–0
Săgeata Năvodari	1–2	3–4	0–0	1–0	0–2	2–1	4–0	1–0	0–1	1–0	2–1	0–4	2–3		1–2	1–0	0–1	3–1
Steaua București	3–0	3–1	3–0	4–0	2–1	3–0	4–0	3–0	1–1	3–0	2–2	2–2	1–1	5–0		2–0	0–1	4–0
Universitatea Cluj	1–2	1–0	2–0	2–1	1–1	0–0	0–3	3–2	0–1	1–0	1–0	0–3	0–1	1–1	0–1		1–0	3–1
Vaslui	1–0	1–4	1–0	0–1	3–0	4–0	1–0	8–1	1–1	1–0	1–4	1–0	1–1	1–0	0–1	2–0		0–1
Viitorul Constanța	1–2	0–4	0–0	0–0	1–0	1–1	1–1	1–0	0–0	0–0	4–3	0–1	2–0	0–0	0–3	1–0	2–0	

Source: LPF (in Romanian)
Legend: Blue = home team win; Yellow = draw; Red = away team win.

== Top goalscorers ==
Rank	Player	Club	Goals
1	(Romania) Liviu Antal	Vaslui	15
2	(Romania) Valentin Lemnaru	Universitatea Cluj	13
2	(Romania) Constantin Budescu	Astra Giurgiu	13
4	(Romania) Szabolcs Székely	Poli Timișoara	11
4	(Brazil) Eric Pereira^{1}	Pandurii Târgu Jiu	11
4	(Brazil) Alex dos Santos Gonçalves	Pandurii Târgu Jiu	11
7	(Bosnia and Herzegovina) Bojan Golubović	Ceahlăul Piatra Neamț	10
7	(Italy) Federico Piovaccari	Steaua București	10
7	(Uruguay) Juan Ángel Albín	Petrolul Ploiești	10
7	(Brazil) Marquinhos Carioca	Oțelul Galați	10
7	(Brazil) Wellington Carlos da Silva	Concordia Chiajna	10

Last updated: 19 April 2014
^{1} Eric was transferred to Al-Ahli during the winter transfer window.

== Champion squad ==
Steaua București

Goalkeepers: Florin Niță (5 / 0); Ciprian Tătărușanu (29 / 0).
Defenders: Vlad Chiricheș (2 / 0); Florin Gardoș (29 / 2); Daniel Georgievski (North Macedonia) (9 / 1); Iasmin Latovlevici (25 / 3); Gabriel Matei (2 / 0); Paul Pârvulescu (15 / 1); Cornel Râpă (7 / 0); Łukasz Szukała (Poland) (29 / 4); Fernando Varela (Cape Verde) (23 / 4).
Midfielders: Alexandru Bourceanu (17 / 0); Alexandru Chipciu (22 / 6); Lucian Filip (12 / 2); Adrian Cristea (9 / 1); Răzvan Grădinaru (2 / 0); Ionuț Neagu (4 / 0); Mihai Pintilii (23 / 0); Adrian Popa (28 / 7); Andrei Prepeliță (26 / 3); Mihai Răduț (7 / 0); Lucian Sânmărtean (12 / 2); Nicolae Stanciu (29 / 5); Cristian Tănase (24 / 2); Alexandru Târnovan (1 / 0); Robert Vâlceanu (4 / 1).
Forwards: Mihai Costea (1 / 0); Gabriel Iancu (19 / 2); Pantelis Kapetanos (Greece) (8 / 3); Claudiu Keșerü (17 / 8); Stefan Nikolić (Montenegro) (4 / 0); Federico Piovaccari (Italy) (25 / 10); Leandro Tatu (Brazil) (7 / 1).
(league appearances and goals listed in brackets)

Manager: Laurențiu Reghecampf.

== Statistics ==
=== Scoring ===
- First goal of the season: (Romania) Szabolcs Székely (Poli) against Dinamo
- Hat-tricks of the season:
  - (Romania) Constantin Budescu (Astra) against Viitorul (stage 1)
  - (Nigeria) Derick Ogbu (CFR) against Oțelul (stage 10)
- Fastest goal of the season: (Romania) Constantin Budescu (Astra) against Dinamo (15 seconds)

== Awards ==
=== Monthly awards ===
Month	Player of the Month		Reference
Month	Player	Club	Reference
July	(Romania) Constantin Budescu	Astra Giurgiu	
August	(Romania) Constantin Budescu	Astra Giurgiu	
September	(Brazil) (Romania) Eric Pereira	Pandurii Târgu Jiu	
October	(Brazil) (Romania) Eric Pereira	Pandurii Târgu Jiu	
November	(Romania) Valentin Lemnaru	Universitatea Cluj	
December	(Tunisia) Hamza Younés	Petrolul Ploiești	
March	(Romania) Alexandru Chipciu	Steaua București	
April	(Romania) Cosmin Matei	Dinamo București	
May	(Romania) Ciprian Deac	CFR Cluj	

== Attendances ==
#	Club	Average
1	Petrolul	10,000
2	Steaua	9,688
3	Dinamo 1948	7,336
4	U Cluj	4,929
5	Botoșani	4,276
6	CFR Cluj	4,265
7	Timișoara	3,588
8	Oțelul	3,500
9	Pandurii	2,982
10	Astra	2,749
11	Ceahlăul	2,647
12	Vaslui	2,059
13	Brașov	1,924
14	Gaz Metan	1,924
15	Concordia	1,365
16	Săgeata	1,300
17	Viitorul	1,194
18	Corona	1,051
