= Alin Damian =

Romanian professional footballer

Personal information
- Full name: Alin Constantin Damian
- Date of birth: 11 April 1994 (age 32)
- Place of birth: Brașov, Romania
- Height: 1.83 m (6 ft 0 in)
- Position: Striker

Youth career
- FC Brașov

Senior career*
| Years | Team | Apps | (Gls) |
| 2011–2014 | FC Brașov | 3 | (0) |
| 2012 | FC Brașov II | 12 | (13) |
| 2013 | → Unirea Tărlungeni (loan) | | |
| 2013 | → Civitas Făgăraș (loan) | | |
| 2014 | → FC Păpăuți (loan) | | |
| 2014–2015 | AFC Hărman | 13 | (18) |
| 2015–2016 | Unirea Tărlungeni | 8 | (0) |
| 2016 | KSE Târgu Secuiesc | 9 | (13) |
| 2017 | AFC Hărman | | |
| 2017–2018 | SR Brașov | 30 | (62) |
| 2018–2019 | Olimpic Cetate Râșnov | 25 | (12) |
| 2019 | Emblem IL | 12 | (9) |
| 2020–2021 | Corona Brașov | 13 | (9) |
| Total | | 125 | (127) |
- * Club domestic league appearances and goals as of 08:13, 16 June 2021 (UTC)

Alin Constantin Damian (born 11 April 1994) is a Romanian professional footballer who plays as a striker. In his career, Damian also played for teams such as FC Brașov, Unirea Tărlungeni, SR Brașov or Olimpic Cetate Râșnov, among others. He also played in the Norwegian fifth tier for Emblem IL.

== Honours ==
Unirea Tărlungeni

- Liga III: 2012–13

AFC Hărman

- Liga IV: 2014–15

Corona Brașov

- Liga III: 2020–21
- Liga IV: 2019–20
