= Marian Cristescu =

Romanian footballer

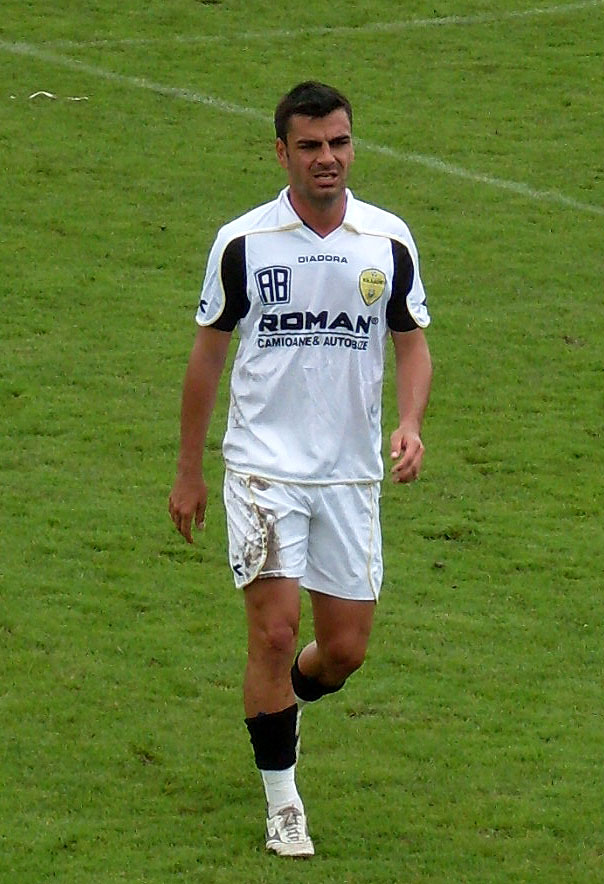

Personal information
- Date of birth: 17 March 1985 (age 41)
- Place of birth: Chiajna, Romania
- Height: 1.75 m (5 ft 9 in)
- Position: Attacking midfielder

Team information
- Current team: Săcele (manager)

Senior career*
Years	Team	Apps	(Gls)
2002–2004	Electromagnetica	20	(1)
2005–2011	FC Brașov	154	(15)
2006–2007	→ Săcele (loan)	15	(2)
2012	Universitatea Cluj	14	(2)
2012–2013	Petrolul Ploiești	24	(2)
2013–2015	Astra Giurgiu	39	(7)
2015	Dinamo București	14	(0)
2015–2019	Concordia Chiajna	130	(21)
2019	SR Brașov	6	(3)
2020–2021	Corona Brașov	24	(11)
Total		440	(64)

Managerial career
- 2019: SR Brașov (assistant)
- 2024–: Săcele
- * Club domestic league appearances and goals as of 15:52, 28 December 2024 (UTC)

Marian Cristescu (born 17 March 1985) is a Romanian footballer who plays as a midfielder.

== Honours ==
FC Brașov

- Romanian Second League: 2007–08

Petrolul Ploiești

- Romanian Cup: 2012–13

Astra Giurgiu

- Romanian Cup: 2013–14
- Romanian Superup: 2014

Corona Brașov

- Romanian Third League: 2020–21
