= Florin Stângă =

Romanian footballer and manager

Personal information
- Full name: Florin Cornel Stângă
- Date of birth: 22 June 1978 (age 48)
- Place of birth: Brașov, Romania
- Height: 1.70 m (5 ft 7 in)
- Position: Midfielder

Youth career
- –1996: FC Brașov

Senior career*
Years	Team	Apps	(Gls)
1996–1997	Nitramonia Făgăraș		
1997–1998	FC Brașov	23	(1)
1998–1999	Nitramonia Făgăraș	23	(0)
1999–2001	Metrom Brașov	60	(3)
2001–2002	Cimentul Fieni	28	(4)
2002–2004	FC Brașov	26	(2)
2004	FC Ghimbav	4	(0)
2005	Juventus București	15	(1)
2005–2006	Forex Brașov	28	(8)
2006–2009	Pandurii Târgu Jiu	108	(10)
2010	Skoda Xanthi	11	(0)
2010–2011	FCM Târgu Mureș	14	(0)
2011–2012	FC Brașov	15	(0)
2012–2014	Corona Brașov	23	(1)
2014–2016	Sepsi OSK		
2016–2017	AFC Hărman		
2018–2020	SR Brașov	39	(5)
Total		417	(35)

Managerial career
- 2016–2017: AFC Hărman (player/assistant)
- 2017: AFC Hărman (player/coach)
- 2018–2020: SR Brașov (player/coach)
- 2020–2021: Odorheiu Secuiesc
- 2021: Astra Giurgiu
- 2022: Academica Clinceni
- 2022–2023: Viitorul Târgu Jiu
- 2023: Tunari
- 2024–2025: Petrolul Ploiești (assistant)
- 2024: Petrolul Ploiești (caretaker)
- * Club domestic league appearances and goals

Florin Cornel Stângă (born 22 June 1978) is a Romanian football manager and former player.

== Honours ==
=== Player ===
Nitramonia Făgăraș

- Divizia C: 1996–97

Corona Brașov

- Liga II: 2012–13

Sepsi OSK

- Liga III: 2015–16

SR Brașov

- Liga IV – Brașov County: 2017–18

=== Coach ===
SR Brașov

- Liga IV – Brașov County: 2017–18
