= Remus Dănălache =

Romanian footballer

Personal information
- Full name: Remus Cristian Dănălache
- Date of birth: 14 January 1984 (age 42)
- Place of birth: Brașov, Romania
- Height: 1.85 m (6 ft 1 in)
- Position: Goalkeeper

Youth career
- 1994–2002: Brașov

Senior career*
Years	Team	Apps	(Gls)
2003–2006	Tractorul Brașov	36	(0)
2006–2009	Forex Brașov	18	(0)
2009	Arieșul Turda	6	(0)
2009–2011	Târgu Mureș	20	(0)
2011–2012	Voința Sibiu	10	(0)
2012–2013	Mioveni	4	(0)
2013–2014	Corona Brașov	10	(0)
2014–2015	Unirea Tărlungeni	7	(0)
Total		111	(0)
- * Club domestic league appearances and goals as of 22 November 2015

Remus Cristian Dănălache (born 14 January 1984) is a Romanian former football goalkeeper who played 31 matches in the Romanian Liga I. In his career, Dănălache played for teams such as Tractorul Brașov, Forex Brașov, ASA 2013 Târgu Mureș or Voința Sibiu, among others.
