= Marius Burlacu =

Romanian professional footballer

Personal information
- Full name: Marius Mihai Burlacu
- Date of birth: 29 October 1985 (age 41)
- Place of birth: Brașov, Romania
- Height: 1.77 m (5 ft 10 in)
- Position: Midfielder

Team information
- Current team: KSE Târgu Secuiesc
- Number: 4

Senior career*
Years	Team	Apps	(Gls)
2006–2008	Forex Brașov	56	(1)
2009–2010	Ceahlăul Piatra Neamț	36	(1)
2010–2012	Voința Sibiu	37	(2)
2013–2014	Corona Brașov	32	(0)
2014–2015	Olimpia Satu Mare	10	(0)
2015–2016	Unirea Tărlungeni	32	(0)
2016–2018	Sepsi OSK	47	(0)
2018	SR Brașov	8	(0)
2019	AFC Hărman	14	(0)
2019–2021	Corona Brașov	29	(5)
2021–2023	FC Brașov	40	(0)
2023–2024	Cetate Râșnov	25	(0)
2024–	KSE Târgu Secuiesc	9	(0)
- * Club domestic league appearances and goals as of 09:29, 28 December 2024 (UTC)

Marius Mihai Burlacu (born 29 October 1985) is a Romanian professional footballer who plays as a midfielder for KSE Târgu Secuiesc.

== Honours ==
Corona Brașov

- Liga III: 2020–21
- Liga IV: 2019–20
