= Ion Coman =

Romanian football player

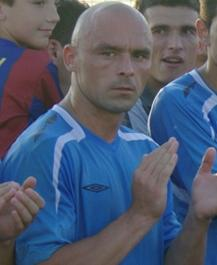

Personal information
- Full name: Ion Cornel Coman
- Date of birth: 13 July 1981 (age 45)
- Place of birth: Braşov, Romania
- Height: 1.80 m (5 ft 11 in)
- Position: Striker

Team information
- Current team: Precizia Săcele
- Number: 10

Senior career*
Years	Team	Apps	(Gls)
2001–2005	Braşov	11	(1)
2004	→ Royal Ghimbav (loan)	12	(5)
2004–2005	→ Forex Braşov (loan)	11	(18)
2005–2008	Forex Braşov	55	(20)
2008–2009	Ştiinţa Bacău	12	(3)
2009–2011	Victoria Brăneşti	42	(12)
2011–2012	Voinţa Sibiu	11	(1)
2012–2014	Corona Braşov	29	(11)
2014	Râmnicu Vâlcea	11	(1)
2015	Sepsi OSK	?	(?)
2015	Unirea Tărlungeni	10	(2)
2016–	Precizia Săcele	?	(32)
- * Club domestic league appearances and goals as of 29 December 2017

Ion Cornel Coman (born 13 July 1981) is a Romanian football player who plays for Precizia Săcele as a striker.

He started his senior career in his home town, Braşov. After his loan to Forex Braşov from FC Brașov, the Forex administration signed him as their own player, as he became a first eleven choice for them. His Liga II performances helped his team almost reach Liga I, but, after the loss in the 2005–2006 play-off for first league promotion, the team was soon dissolved (in 2008) and Coman had to find work elsewhere.

He did eventually get to perform in Liga 1, after his promotion with Victoria Brăneşti, and his following signing with Voinţa Sibiu.

After their relegation Cornel Coman returned to his hometown with the newly founded team called Corona Braşov. Following the 2012–13 winter outgoing transfers, Coman became the captain of Corona Braşov.

== Achievements ==
Victoria Brăneşti

- Liga II: 2009–10

Corona Braşov

- Liga II: 2012–13
