= Valentin Lemnaru =

Romanian footballer

Personal information
- Full name: Valentin Ionuț Lemnaru
- Date of birth: 24 June 1984 (age 42)
- Place of birth: Lehliu Gară, Romania
- Height: 1.89 m (6 ft 2 in)
- Position: Forward

Youth career
- Victoria Lehliu
- 1998–2001: Sportul Studențesc București

Senior career*
Years	Team	Apps	(Gls)
2001–2005	Politehnica Timișoara	12	(4)
2005–2006	Dunărea Călărași	34	(12)
2006–2009	Dinamo București	1	(0)
2006–2009	Dinamo II București	75	(45)
2009	→ Astra Ploiești (loan)	11	(2)
2009–2010	Universitatea Cluj	37	(16)
2011–2013	Pandurii Târgu Jiu	71	(14)
2013–2014	Universitatea Cluj	28	(13)
2014	Steaua București	0	(0)
2014–2015	Universitatea Cluj	19	(3)
2015–2016	Petrolul Ploiești	7	(1)
2016	East Riffa	0	(0)
2016–2017	Academica Clinceni	11	(0)
2017	Târgu Mureș	7	(0)
2017–2018	Universitatea Cluj	19	(7)
2018–2019	Sticla Arieșul Turda	26	(11)
2019	Unirea Dej	7	(0)
2020–2021	Sticla Arieșul Turda	18	(3)
2021–2023	Sănătatea Cluj	19	(1)
Total		402	(132)

Managerial career
- 2021: Sticla Arieșul Turda (assistant)
- 2021–2023: Sănătatea Cluj (assistant)
- * Club domestic league appearances and goals as of 11:06, 24 November 2023 (UTC)

Valentin Ionuț Lemnaru (born 24 June 1984) is a Romanian former footballer who played as a forward. He played in Liga I for Politehnica Timișoara, Pandurii Târgu Jiu, Petrolul Ploiești and Universitatea Cluj.

== Career ==
Lemnaru started playing football as a goalkeeper at the age of eight at his home town team, Victoria Lehliu. When he was fourteen, he went to Sportul Studenţesc and decided to play as a forward because he was too short to be a goalkeeper.

Lemnaru left Sportul Studenţesc to join Politehnica Timișoara in 2001. In 2003, due to salary issues, he refused to play for Politehnica Timișoara and he was suspended by the team owner, Claudio Zambon, for almost two years. During the suspension he worked at the A2 motorway (Romania). In 2005, with the help of Lehliu's mayor, who paid Zambon the player's transfer fee, Lemnaru returned to his home town team and he was soon transferred to Dunărea Călărași.

In 2006 Lemnaru joined Dinamo București. He played mostly for the reserves team of the club but he made one appearance at the first team with whom he won the 2006–07 Liga I title. In January 2009 he was loaned to Astra Ploieşti and later that year Lemnaru was transferred by the second league team Universitatea Cluj. He scored 16 goals for Universitatea Cluj in one and a half seasons and after the team promoted in Liga I, the striker was loaned to Pandurii Târgu Jiu.

Later he was definitively transferred to Pandurii Târgu Jiu where he played until September 2013, scoring 15 goals in 71 matches. With Pandurii he managed to finish the 2012–13 Liga I season on the second place, thus leading to the 2013–14 UEFA Europa League qualification.

Lemnaru returned at Universitatea Cluj for whom he scored 13 goals in the 2013–14 Liga I season. He had a significant contribution to saving the team from relegation, being the top scorer of Universitatea Cluj and the second highest scorer of 2013–14 Liga I season. Rumors appeared that Lemnaru could be called to play for the Romania national football team, or the Moldova national football team but none were concretized.

In July 2014, Lemnaru signed a contract for two years with the Romanian champions Steaua București. He made his debut for Steaua in a UEFA Champions League game against FC Aktobe. But this remained his only game for Steaua, and in September 2014 he was sold back to Universitatea Cluj where he signed a two-year deal.

== Honours ==
Dinamo II București

- Liga III: 2006–07

Dinamo București

- Liga I: 2006–07

Pandurii Târgu Jiu

- Liga I Runner-up: 2012–13

Individual

- Liga I Player of the Month: November 2013
