= Răzvan Damian =

Romanian footballer

Personal information
- Full name: Răzvan Tudor Damian
- Date of birth: 15 July 1983 (age 43)
- Place of birth: Brașov, Romania
- Height: 1.86 m (6 ft 1 in)
- Position: Defender

Team information
- Current team: KSE Târgu Secuiesc

Senior career*
Years	Team	Apps	(Gls)
2007–2010	Dunărea Giurgiu	73	(3)
2010–2011	Astra II Giurgiu	26	(4)
2011–2012	Callatis Mangalia	28	(2)
2012–2014	Corona Brașov	46	(1)
2014–2015	Săgeata Năvodari	14	(1)
2016–2017	Sepsi OSK	44	(3)
2018	SR Brașov	23	(6)
2019	AFC Hărman		
2020–	KSE Târgu Secuiesc		
- * Club domestic league appearances and goals as of 3 August 2020

Răzvan Tudor Damian (born 15 July 1983) is a Romanian professional footballer who plays as a defender for Liga III side KSE Târgu Secuiesc.
