= Giorginho Aguirre =

Uruguayan footballer (born 1993)

Personal information
- Full name: José Giorginho Aguirre Fleitas
- Date of birth: 23 March 1993 (age 33)
- Place of birth: Paysandú, Uruguay
- Height: 1.74 m (5 ft 8 1/2 in)
- Position: Midfielder

Team information
- Current team: Torque

Youth career
- Nacional

Senior career*
Years	Team	Apps	(Gls)
2012–2013	Miramar Misiones	11	(0)
2013	Corona Brașov	6	(0)
2014	Vllaznia Shkodër	1	(0)
2015	Liria Prizren		
2015–2016	Cerro Largo	7	(1)
2016	Canadian	7	(2)
2017–	Torque	1	(0)
- * Club domestic league appearances and goals as of 15 May 217

José Giorginho Aguirre Fleitas (born 23 March 1993 in Paysandú) is a Uruguayan footballer who plays for Torque.

== Club career ==
Aguirre had a spell in Albania with Vllaznia Shkodër.
