= Marian Constantinescu =

Romanian professional footballer

Personal information
- Full name: Marian Constantin Constantinescu
- Date of birth: 8 August 1981 (age 45)
- Place of birth: Bucharest, Romania
- Height: 1.77 m (5 ft 10 in)
- Position: Striker

Senior career*
Years	Team	Apps	(Gls)
1999–2000	Brașov	1	(0)
2001–2004	Juventus București	25	(6)
2004–2006	Politehnica Timișoara	27	(1)
2004–2005	→ CFR Timișoara (loan)	1	(0)
2005–2006	→ Gloria Bistrița (loan)	4	(0)
2006–2007	Jiul Petroșani	15	(1)
2007–2008	Brașov	13	(0)
2008–2009	Inter Curtea de Argeș	28	(4)
2009–2010	Otopeni	24	(3)
2010–2014	Ceahlăul Piatra Neamț	106	(22)
2014–2015	Brașov	34	(11)
2015–2017	Concordia Chiajna	29	(2)
2017	→ Concordia II Chiajna	11	(5)
2017	Academica Clinceni	15	(8)
2018	Juventus București	13	(0)
2018	Turris Turnu Măgurele	7	(6)
2019	AFC Hărman	14	(6)
2019–2020	Corona Brașov	11	(11)
Total		378	(86)

Managerial career
- 2020–2021: Corona Brașov U19
- 2024–: Corona Brașov
- * Club domestic league appearances and goals as of 27 October 2020

Marian Constantin Constantinescu (born 8 August 1981) is a Romanian former professional footballer who played as a striker for teams such as Politehnica Timișoara, Inter Curtea de Argeș, Ceahlăul Piatra Neamț, FC Brașov, Concordia Chiajna or Corona Brașov, among others.

== Club career ==
=== Concordia Chiajna ===
Constantinescu made a free transfer from FC Brașov to his current club Concordia Chiajna on 1 July 2016, where he has since made 23 league appearances, providing 2 goals.

On 18 September 2016, Constantinescu helped his side achieve a draw against CS U Craiova with a dipping bicycle kick that came in the 75th minute of the match, which earned his team their 8th point of the season.
