= Remo Amadio =

Italian footballer

Personal information
- Date of birth: 24 November 1987 (age 38)
- Place of birth: Giulianova, Italy
- Height: 1.95 m (6 ft 5 in)
- Position: Goalkeeper

Team information
- Current team: Casoli
- Number: 1

Youth career
- –2006: Pescara

Senior career*
Years	Team	Apps	(Gls)
2006–2009	Pescara	2	(0)
2008–2009	→ Andria (loan)	8	(0)
2009–2010	Cassino	9	(0)
2011–2015	CFR Cluj	4	(0)
2011–2013	→ UTA Arad (loan)	30	(0)
2013	→ Corona Brașov (loan)	0	(0)
2016	Tatabánya		
2016–2018	Rosetana		
2018–2020	Pineto	23	(0)
2020–2021	Real Giulianova	12	(0)
2021–2023	Recanatese	18	(0)
2023–2024	Roseto		
2024–	Casoli		
- * Club domestic league appearances and goals

Remo Amadio (born 24 November 1987) is an Italian footballer who plays as a goalkeeper for Promozione club Casoli.
