= Mihai Stere (footballer, born 1975) =

Romanian footballer

Personal information
- Date of birth: 30 December 1975 (age 50)
- Place of birth: Constanța, Romania
- Height: 1.75 m (5 ft 9 in)
- Position: Midfielder

Team information
- Current team: Precizia Săcele (manager)

Youth career
- 1990–1994: Conpref Constanța
- 1994–1996: Midia Năvodari

Senior career*
Years	Team	Apps	(Gls)
1996–2000	Farul Constanța	95	(11)
2000–2004	Brașov	106	(20)
2004–2006	Nea Salamina	43	(10)
2006–2008	Aris Limassol	38	(3)
2008	Concordia Chiajna	8	(0)
2008–2011	Târgu Mureș	73	(10)
2011	Concordia Chiajna	15	(0)
2012–2013	Corona Brașov	12	(0)
2013	Târgu Mureș	6	(0)
2013	Corona Brașov	2	(0)
Total		398	(54)

Managerial career
- 2015: Brașov (assistant)
- 2016: Brașov
- 2016–2017: Brașov (assistant)
- 2017–2018: Precizia Săcele
- 2020–: Olimpic Zărnești
- * Club domestic league appearances and goals

Mihai Stere (born 30 December 1975) is a Romanian former professional footballer who played as a midfielder. He played in his career for teams such as: Farul Constanța, Brașov, Nea Salamina, Aris Limassol and Târgu Mureș, among others. After retiring, Stere began his managerial career as an assistant coach at Brașov and later as head coach of Precizia Săcele and Olimpic Zărnești, starting in 2020.
