= Marius Martac =

Romanian footballer

Personal information
- Full name: Marius Mădălin Martac
- Date of birth: 5 July 1991 (age 35)
- Place of birth: Găești, Romania
- Height: 1.71 m (5 ft 7 in)
- Position: Right back

Team information
- Current team: Metaloglobus București
- Number: 21

Senior career*
Years	Team	Apps	(Gls)
2010–2011	Urban Titu		
2011–2014	Oțelul Larissa		
2012–2014	→ Corona Brașov (loan)	34	(1)
2014	Universitatea Cluj	2	(0)
2015–2022	Chindia Târgoviște	195	(4)
2022–2024	Politehnica Iași	49	(0)
2024–2026	Chindia Târgoviște	52	(1)
2026–	Metaloglobus București	12	(0)
- * Club domestic league appearances and goals as of 31 October 2026

Marius Mădălin Martac (born 5 July 1991) is a Romanian professional footballer who plays as a right back for Liga II club Metaloglobus București.

== Honours ==
Corona Brașov

- Liga II: 2012–13

Chindia Târgoviște

- Liga II: 2018–19
- Liga III: 2014–15

Politehnica Iași

- Liga II: 2022–23
