= Carpați Stadium (1950) =

Stadium in Braşov, Romania

Stadionul Carpați
- Interactive map of Stadionul Carpați
- Address: Str. Zizinului, nr. 119
- Location: Brașov, Romania
- Coordinates: 45°38′53″N 25°39′01″E
- Owner: Municipality of Brașov
- Capacity: 1,200 (350 seated)
- Surface: Grass

Construction
- Opened: 1950
- Renovated: 1980s, 2010
- Demolished: 2020

Tenants
- Carpați Brașov; Corona Brașov (2010–2014), (2019–2020); Colțea Brașov (2015–2016)

Stadionul Carpaţi was a multi-use stadium in Brașov, Romania. It was used mostly for football matches and was the home ground of Carpați Brașov, Corona Brașov and Colțea Brașov, among others. It had a capacity of 1,200 people and was slightly renovated in 2010, when it became the home ground of Corona, following the team's promotion to the Liga III.

The stadium was demolished in 2020, after more than 70 years of existence.
