= Marian Măuță =

Romanian footballer

Marian Măuţă
Personal information
- Full name: Marian Măuţă
- Date of birth: 1 February 1976
- Place of birth: Bucharest, Socialist Republic of Romania
- Date of death: 24 November 2013 (aged 37)
- Place of death: Bucharest, Romania
- Position: Midfielder

Senior career*
Years	Team	Apps	(Gls)
1993–1997	Tractorul Brașov	64	(4)
1997	Sportul Studențesc	5	(0)
1997–1998	Tractorul Brașov	26	(3)
1998–2001	Brașov	79	(7)
2002–2003	FC Oradea	25	(1)
Total		199	(15)
- * Club domestic league appearances and goals as of 24 November 2013

Marian Măuţă (1 February 1976 – 24 November 2013) was a Romanian footballer, who primarily played as a midfielder.

Marian Măuţă died on 24 November 2013, aged 37, in his hometown of Bucharest, Romania.
