= Aurel Țicleanu =

Romanian football player and manager

Aurel Ţicleanu
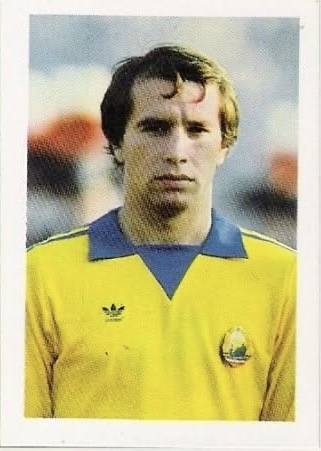
- Țicleanu in the 1980s

Personal information
- Date of birth: 20 January 1959 (age 67)
- Place of birth: Teliuc, Romania
- Height: 1.77 m (5 ft 10 in)
- Position: Midfielder

Youth career
- 1974–1976: Metalurgistul Sadu

Senior career*
Years	Team	Apps	(Gls)
1976–1985	Universitatea Craiova	232	(10)
1985–1989	Sportul Studenţesc	105	(11)
1989–1990	Olympiakos Nicosia	10	(0)
Total		347	(21)

International career
1979–1986	Romania	42	(2)

Managerial career
- 1991–1992: UTA Arad
- 1992–1994: Oţelul Galaţi
- 1994: Universitatea Craiova
- 1994–1995: Romania U–21
- 1995–1996: Evagoras Paphos
- 1996–1997: Rocar București
- 1997–1999: Maghreb Fez
- 2000: Oțelul Galați
- 2001–2002: Tractorul Brașov
- 2002: Bangladesh U–20
- 2002: Maghreb Fez
- 2002–2003: Dinamo Tirana
- 2003: Lushnja
- 2003–2004: Maghreb Fez
- 2004: Hassania Agadir
- 2006–2008: Al Sahel
- 2008: Al Jahra
- 2008–2009: Al Shabab U–19
- 2009–2010: Al Sahel
- 2010: Universitatea Craiova
- 2011: Universitatea Craiova
- 2011–2012: Ohud Medina
- 2013: Corona Brașov
- 2013: FC Brașov
- 2016: Qatar SC
- 2018–2019: Romania U-17
- * Club domestic league appearances and goals

Aurel Țicleanu (born 20 January 1959) is a Romanian football manager and former player who played as a midfielder.

== Playing career ==
=== Club career ===
Țicleanu began his youth career with Metallurgistul Sadu in 1974. He was quickly spotted there by manager Constantin Oţet who brought him to Universitatea Craiova in 1976. He made his professional debut at age 17 with Craiova during the 1976–77 season. Țicleanu spent nine seasons at the club, and won the league title twice, in 1980 and 1981, also reaching the semi-finals of the UEFA Cup in 1983.

In the 1985–86 season, he joined Sportul Studențesc of Bucharest, helping them to a second-place finish in the Divizia A, the club's highest ranking ever. He remained at the club for four seasons, before joining Cypriot side Olympiakos Nicosia, where he retired in 1991.

=== International career ===
Țicleanu made his full international debut on 29 August 1979 against Poland at the age of 20. He earned 42 caps for the Romania national team, and participated at UEFA Euro 1984.

== Managerial career ==
After retiring as a footballer, Țicleanu went on to become a football coach for a number of teams in Romania including UTA Arad, Oţelul Galaţi, FC U Craiova and Romania U–21 team.

He has also coached various national youth teams and clubs in Cyprus, Albania, Morocco, Bangladesh, Kuwait and Saudi Arabia. His former clubs include Evagoras Paphos, Maghreb Fez, Dinamo Tirana, KS Lushnja, Hassania Agadir, Bangladesh U–20 team, Al Sahel and Al Jahra, Corona Brasov and FC Brasov.

In April 2014, he became the head of the scouting department at the Romanian Football Federation. On 27 June 2016, Țicleanu was hired as Qatar SC manager replacing Sebastião Lazaroni.
