= FC Forex Brașov =

Forex Braşov
- Full name: Fotbal Club Forex Braşov
- Nickname: Pădurarii (The Woodsmen)
- Short name: Forex
- Founded: 2002
- Dissolved: 2011
- Ground: Forex
- Capacity: 5,000
Home colours	Away colours

Fotbal Club Forex Braşov was a Romanian professional football club from Braşov, Romania, founded in October 2002 and dissolved in 2011.

== History ==
The club almost managed to promote in the 2006–07 season of the Liga I, but lost in the playoffs to Unirea Urziceni.

On October 21, 2008, chairman Nicolae Ţucunel announced that the team has withdrawn from the Liga II championship and that he will keep only the junior squads.

The team was enrolled for the 2009–10 season in the Liga IV.

In the 2010–11 season they won the county series of the Liga IV and qualified for the promotion playoff. They were defeated on penalties by Atletic Fieni and thus missed promotion to the Liga III.

On July 4, 2011, Nicolae Ţucunel announced that the team will not sign up for the following season of the Liga IV and that the club will remain just a football academy for youth squads.

In the 2011–12 season, only the youth team is competing in the juniors category of the Liga IV, Braşov County.

== Honours ==
Liga II

- Winners (0):
- Runners-up (1): 2005–06

Liga III

- Winners (1): 2004–05

Liga IV – Brașov County

- Winners (1): 2010–11

== Player history ==
- (Romania) Virgil Marşavela (2004–2006)
- (Romania) Cornel Coman (2004–2009)
- (Romania) Florin Dumitru (2005–2007)
- (Romania) Cosmin Băcilă (2005–2006)
- (Romania) Attila Vajda (2005–2006)
- (Romania) Florin Stângă (2005–2006)
- (Romania) Gabriel Kajcsa (2005–2006)
- (Romania) Florin Manea (2005–2007)
- (Romania) Andrei Bozeşan (2006–2007)
- (Romania) Iulian Popa (2006–2008)
- (Romania) Remus Dănălache (2006–2009)
- (Romania) Cosmin Frăsinescu (2006–2007)
- (Romania) Eugen Beza (2007–2008)
- (Romania) Tiberiu Marcu (2007–2008)
- (Romania) Robert Tufişi (2007–2008)
- (Romania) Cristian Dumitru Apostol (2007–2009)
- (Romania) Silviu Pintea (2007–2009)
- (Romania) Marius Burlacu (2007–2009)
- (Romania) Ionuț Neagu (2007–2009)
- (Romania) Irinel Voicu (2008–2009)
- (Romania) Claudiu Codoban (2008–2009)
- (Romania) Ionuț Vasiliu (2008–2009)
- (Romania) Bogdan Stegaru (2008–2009)
- (Romania) Alexandru Marc (2008–2009)
- (Romania) Alexandru Chipciu (2008–2009)

== Manager history ==
- (Romania) Eugen Moldovan (2002–2003)
- (Romania) Adrian Hârlab (2003–2007)
- (Romania) Gabriel Stan (2007)
- (Romania) Alexandru Pelici (2007–2008)
- (Romania) Alin Artimon (2008)
- (Romania) Călin Moldovan (2008–2011)
