= Óscar Arce (Colombian footballer) =

Colombian footballer (born 1990)

Personal information
- Full name: Óscar Darío Arce Valenzuela
- Date of birth: 15 February 1990 (age 36)
- Place of birth: Bogotá, Colombia
- Height: 1.80 m (5 ft 11 in)
- Position: Defender

Senior career*
Years	Team	Apps	(Gls)
2008–2010	Juventud	18	(1)
2010–2011	La Equidad	8	(0)
2012	Uniautónoma	13	(1)
2012–2013	Rampla Juniors	6	(0)
2013	Corona Brașov	10	(0)
2014	Atlético Bucaramanga	11	(1)
2015	Atenas	7	(0)
Total		73	(3)
- * Club domestic league appearances and goals

Óscar Darío Arce Valenzuela (born 15 February 1990) is a Colombian former professional footballer who played as a defender.

== Honours ==
- La Equidad:
  - Categoría Primera A: runner-up 2011
