= Liga IV Brașov =

Fourth tier Romanian football league

- Founded: 1968
- Country: Romania
- Level on pyramid: 4
- Promotion to: Liga III
- Relegation to: Liga V Brașov
- Domestic cup: Cupa României – County phase
- Current champions: Corona Brașov (3rd title) (2025–26)
- Most championships: Codlea (6 titles)
- Website: frf-ajf.ro/brasov
- Current: 2025–26 Liga IV Brașov

Liga IV Brașov is one of the regional football divisions of Liga IV, the fourth tier of the Romanian football league system, for clubs based in Brașov County, and is organized by AJF Brașov – Asociația Județeană de Fotbal (lit. 'County Football Association').

It is contested by a variable number of teams, depending on the number of teams relegated from Liga III, the number of teams promoted from Liga V Brașov, and the teams that withdraw or enter the competition. The winner may or may not be promoted to Liga III, depending on the result of a promotion play-off contested against the winner of a neighboring county series.

== History ==
In 1968, following the new administrative and territorial reorganization of the country, each county established its own football championship, integrating teams from the former regional championships as well as those that had previously competed in town and rayon level competitions. The freshly formed Brașov County Championship was placed under the authority of the newly created Consiliul Județean pentru Educație Fizică și Sport (lit. 'County Council for Physical Education and Sports') in Brașov County.

Since then, the structure and organization of Brașov's main county competition, like those of other county championships, have undergone numerous changes. Between 1968 and 1992, it was known as Campionatul Județean (County Championship). In 1992, it was renamed Divizia C – Faza Județeană (Divizia C – County Phase), became Divizia D in 1997, and has been known as Liga IV since 2006.

== Promotion ==
The champions of each county association play against one another in a play-off to earn promotion to Liga III. Geographical criteria are taken into consideration when the play-offs are drawn. In total, there are 41 county champions plus the Bucharest municipal champion.

== List of Champions ==
=== Brașov Regional Championship ===
Ed.	Season	Winners
Stalin Regional Championship
1	1951	Locomotiva Orașul Stalin
2	1952	Avântul Codlea
3	1953	Metalul Tractorul Orașul Stalin
4	1954	Metalul 131 Tohan
5	1955	
6	1956	Chimica Târnăveni
7	1957–58	Chimia Făgăraș
8	1958–59	Metrom Orașul Stalin
9	1959–60	Chimica Târnăveni
Brașov Regional Championship
10	1960–61	Metrom Brașov
11	1961–62	Rulmentul Brașov
12	1962–63	Metrom Brașov
13	1963–64	Rulmentul Brașov
14	1964–65	Metalul Copșa Mică
15	1965–66	ASA Sibiu
16	1966–67	Politehnica Brașov
17	1967–68	Torpedo Zărnești (Brașov Series); Progresul Sibiu (Sibiu Series)

=== Brașov County Championship ===
Ed.	Season	Winners
County Championship
1	1968–69	Celuloza Zărnești
2	1969–70	ICIM Brașov
3	1970–71	Politehnica Brașov
4	1971–72	ICIM Brașov
5	1972–73	Precizia Săcele
6	1973–74	Măgura Codlea
7	1974–75	Utilajul Făgăraș
8	1975–76	Măgura Codlea
9	1976–77	IT Brașov
10	1977–78	Măgura Codlea
11	1978–79	Textila Prejmer
12	1979–80	Cimentul Hoghiz
13	1980–81	Utilajul Făgăraș
14	1981–82	Textila Prejmer
15	1982–83	Celuloza Zărnești
16	1983–84	Cimentul Hoghiz
17	1984–85	Torpedo Zărnești
18	1985–86	Carpați Brașov
19	1986–87	Chimia Orașul Victoria
20	1987–88	Carpați Brașov
21	1988–89	Metrom Brașov
22	1989–90	Torpedo Zărnești
23	1990–91	Carpați Brașov
24	1991–92	Unirea Codlea
Divizia C – County phase
25	1992–93	Precizia Săcele
26	1993–94	Romradiatoare Brașov
27	1994–95	Precizia Săcele
28	1995–96	Romradiatoare Brașov
29	1996–97	Textila Prejmer
Divizia D
30	1997–98	Textila Prejmer
31	1998–99	Rapid Brașov
32	1999–00	Cimentul Hoghiz
33	2000–01	Bucegi Predeal
34	2001–02	Torpedo Zărnești
35	2002–03	Ghimbav 2000
36	2003–04	Victoria Bod
37	2004–05	Cetatea Apața
38	2005–06	Unirea Tărlungeni

Ed.	Season	Winners
Liga IV
39	2006–07	Unirea Tărlungeni
40	2007–08	Victoria Bod
41	2008–09	Inter Cristian
42	2009–10	SCM Brașov
43	2010–11	Forex Brașov
44	2011–12	Făgăraș
45	2012–13	Râșnov
46	2013–14	Zărnești
47	2014–15	Înfrățirea Hărman
48	2015–16	Olimpic Cetate Râșnov
49	2016–17	Viitorul Ghimbav
50	2017–18	SR Brașov
51	2018–19	Olimpic Zărnești
52	2019–20	Corona Brașov
53	2020–21	Codlea
54	2021–22	Olimpic Zărnești
55	2022–23	Ciucaș Tărlungeni
56	2023–24	Codlea
57	2024–25	Săcele
58	2025–26	Corona Brașov

== See also ==
=== Main Leagues ===
- Liga I
- Liga II
- Liga III
- Liga IV

=== County Leagues (Liga IV series) ===
North–East

- Liga IV Bacău
- Liga IV Botoșani
- Liga IV Iași
- Liga IV Neamț
- Liga IV Suceava
- Liga IV Vaslui

North–West

- Liga IV Bihor
- Liga IV Bistrița-Năsăud
- Liga IV Cluj
- Liga IV Maramureș
- Liga IV Satu Mare
- Liga IV Sălaj

Center

- Liga IV Alba
- Liga IV Brașov
- Liga IV Covasna
- Liga IV Harghita
- Liga IV Mureș
- Liga IV Sibiu

West

- Liga IV Arad
- Liga IV Caraș-Severin
- Liga IV Gorj
- Liga IV Hunedoara
- Liga IV Mehedinți
- Liga IV Timiș

South–West

- Liga IV Argeș
- Liga IV Dâmbovița
- Liga IV Dolj
- Liga IV Olt
- Liga IV Teleorman
- Liga IV Vâlcea

South

- Liga IV Bucharest
- Liga IV Călărași
- Liga IV Giurgiu
- Liga IV Ialomița
- Liga IV Ilfov
- Liga IV Prahova

South–East

- Liga IV Brăila
- Liga IV Buzău
- Liga IV Constanța
- Liga IV Galați
- Liga IV Tulcea
- Liga IV Vrancea
