= 2011–12 Liga III =

Liga III
- Season: 2011–12

The 2011–12 Liga III season was the 56th season of the Liga III, the third tier of the Romanian football league system. Day one was played on August 19, 2011 and the last round on June 1, 2012.

== League tables ==
=== Seria I ===
Pos	Team	Pld	W	D	L	GF	GA	GD	Pts	Promotion or relegation
1	Rapid CFR Suceava (C, P)	28	19	6	3	60	20	+40	63	Promotion to Liga II
2	Bacău	28	19	5	4	53	16	+37	62	
3	Petrotub Roman	28	14	7	7	51	29	+22	49	
4	Râmnicu Sărat	28	14	5	9	45	29	+16	47	
5	Sporting Suceava	28	13	6	9	42	35	+7	45	
6	Aerostar Bacău	28	13	4	11	32	27	+5	43	
7	Panciu	28	11	8	9	31	26	+5	41	
8	Dorohoi	28	11	7	10	38	31	+7	40	
9	Oțelul II Galați	28	11	6	11	48	47	+1	39	
10	Pașcani	28	10	6	12	26	37	−11	36	
11	Ceahlăul II Piatra Neamț	28	9	5	14	35	50	−15	32	
12	Focșani	28	6	6	16	16	41	−25	24 (Note: POL 2–3 FOC; FOC 1–0 POL)	
13	Politehnica Galați (R)	28	7	3	18	38	56	−18	24	Relegation to Liga IV
14	Cetatea Târgu Neamț (R)	28	5	8	15	21	48	−27	23	Relegation to Liga IV
15	Stoicescu Buzău (R)	28	5	4	19	24	68	−44	19	Relegation to Liga IV
16	Odorheiu Secuiesc (Note: Odorheiu Secuiesc withdrew from the championship just before it started.) (R)	0	0	0	0	0	0	0	0	Relegation to Liga IV

Source: FRF (in Romanian)
Rules for classification: 1st points; 2nd head-to-head points; 3rd head-to-head goal difference; 4th head-to-head goals scored; 5th head-to-head away goals scored; 6th goal difference; 7th number of goals scored
(C) Champions; (P) Promoted; (R) Relegated

=== Seria II ===
Pos	Team	Pld	W	D	L	GF	GA	GD	Pts	Promotion or relegation
1	Unirea Slobozia (C, P)	28	21	5	2	57	15	+42	68	Promotion to Liga II
2	Afumați	28	18	4	6	53	19	+34	58	
3	Berceni	28	17	5	6	47	25	+22	56	
4	Ștefănești	28	14	7	7	49	24	+25	49 (Note: VII 0-2 ŞTE; ŞTE 1–2 VII)	
5	Viitorul Axintele	28	15	4	9	39	22	+17	49	
6	Voluntari	28	12	5	11	34	31	+3	41	
7	Balotești	28	10	8	10	34	29	+5	38	
8	Viitorul Chirnogi	28	10	7	11	30	39	−9	37	
9	Eolica Baia	28	10	5	13	28	41	−13	35 (Note: TUN 2-1 EOL; EOL 3–1 TUN)	
10	Tunari	28	10	5	13	31	33	−2	35	
11	Rapid II București	28	10	4	14	36	41	−5	34	
12	Dunărea Călărași	28	8	6	14	32	45	−13	30	
13	Conpet Cireșu (R)	28	6	5	17	28	51	−23	23	Relegation to Liga IV
14	Comprest GIM București (R)	28	5	6	17	21	52	−31	21	Relegation to Liga IV
15	Eforie (Note: Eforie withdrew from the championship during the second half and lost all remaining matches with 3-0.) (R)	28	5	2	21	11	63	−52	17	Relegation to Liga IV
16	Phoenix Ulmu (Note: Phoenix Ulmu withdrew from the championship during the first half and all their results were cancelled.) (R)	0	0	0	0	0	0	0	0	Relegation to Liga IV

Source: FRF (in Romanian)
Rules for classification: 1st points; 2nd head-to-head points; 3rd head-to-head goal difference; 4th head-to-head goals scored; 5th head-to-head away goals scored; 6th goal difference; 7th number of goals scored
(C) Champions; (P) Promoted; (R) Relegated

=== Seria III ===
Pos	Team	Pld	W	D	L	GF	GA	GD	Pts	Promotion or relegation
1	Buftea (C, P)	26	15	6	5	47	23	+24	51 (Note: BUF 4-2 VII; VII 2-1 BUF)	Promotion to Liga II
2	Viitorul Domnești	26	16	3	7	33	21	+12	51	
3	Chimia Brazi	26	14	5	7	48	19	+29	47	
4	Conpet Ploiești	26	13	6	7	42	25	+17	45 (Note: CON 3-1 URB; URB 1–2 CON)	
5	Urban Titu	26	14	3	9	43	27	+16	45	
6	Inter Clinceni	26	13	2	11	31	31	0	41	
7	Concordia Chiajna II	26	11	7	8	37	31	+6	40 (Note: CON 4-1 FIL; FIL 1–1 CON)	
8	Filipeștii de Pădure	26	12	4	10	38	38	0	40	
9	Alexandria	26	11	6	9	38	33	+5	39	
10	Plopeni	26	11	4	11	40	34	+6	37 (Note: PRA 0-1 PLO; PLO 2–2 PRA)	
11	Prahova Tomșani	26	11	4	11	36	29	+7	37	
12	Dunărea Turris Turnu Măgurele (Note: Argeşul Mihăilești and Dunărea Turris Turnu Măgurele withdrew from the championship during the second half and lost all remaining matches with 3-0.) (R)	25	4	6	15	16	42	−26	18	Relegation to Liga IV
13	Sportul Studențesc București II	26	3	2	21	24	72	−48	11	
14	Argeşul Mihăilești (R)	25	2	4	19	21	69	−48	10	Relegation to Liga IV
15	Rapid Clejani (Note: Atletic Fieni and Rapid Clejani withdrew from the championship during the first half and all their results were cancelled) (R)	0	0	0	0	0	0	0	0	Relegation to Liga IV
16	Atletic Fieni (R)	0	0	0	0	0	0	0	0	Relegation to Liga IV

Source: FRF (in Romanian)
Rules for classification: 1st points; 2nd head-to-head points; 3rd head-to-head goal difference; 4th head-to-head goals scored; 5th head-to-head away goals scored; 6th goal difference; 7th number of goals scored
(C) Champions; (P) Promoted; (R) Relegated

=== Seria IV ===
Pos	Team	Pld	W	D	L	GF	GA	GD	Pts	Promotion or relegation
1	Damila Măciuca (C, P)	30	18	6	6	50	25	+25	60	Promotion to Liga II
2	Minerul Motru	30	15	9	6	49	23	+26	54 (Note: CAR 0-1 MIN; MIN 1–0 CAR)	
3	Caracal	30	15	9	6	41	24	+17	54	
4	Girom Albota	30	14	6	10	35	26	+9	48	
5	Vișina Nouă	30	14	4	12	33	27	+6	46 (Note: VIS 1-0 CIS; CIS 0–1 VIS)	
6	Cisnădie	30	13	7	10	42	29	+13	46	
7	Jiul Rovinari (Note: Following the decision of the Disciplinary Board, CS Jiu Rovinari was penalised with loss of 2 points.)	30	13	7	10	44	28	+16	44	
8	Gaz Metan Mediaș II	30	12	4	14	27	36	−9	40 (Note: MET 1-3 GAZ; GAZ 0–1 MET)	
9	Metaloglobus București	29	12	4	13	34	36	−2	40	
10	Minerul Mătăsari	30	9	11	10	33	29	+4	38 (Note: PAN 0-0 MIN; MIN 0–0 PAN)	
11	Pandurii Târgu Jiu II	30	10	8	12	32	44	−12	38	
12	FCM Târgoviște	30	10	7	13	28	35	−7	37	
13	Oltchim Râmnicu Vâlcea	29	10	6	13	33	38	−5	36	
14	Prometeu Craiova (R)	30	9	8	13	30	39	−9	35	Relegation to Liga IV
15	Atletic Bradu (R)	30	7	4	19	26	64	−38	25	Relegation to Liga IV
16	Ghecon Lăpuşata (R)	30	6	4	20	27	61	−34	22	Relegation to Liga IV

Source: FRF (in Romanian)
Rules for classification: 1st points; 2nd head-to-head points; 3rd head-to-head goal difference; 4th head-to-head goals scored; 5th head-to-head away goals scored; 6th goal difference; 7th number of goals scored
(C) Champions; (P) Promoted; (R) Relegated

=== Seria V ===
Pos	Team	Pld	W	D	L	GF	GA	GD	Pts	Promotion or relegation
1	Recaș (C, P)	30	22	4	4	64	19	+45	70	Promotion to Liga II
2	Hunedoara	30	18	7	5	54	18	+36	61	
3	Bihorul Beiuș	30	16	5	9	55	42	+13	53	
4	Politehnica Timișoara II	30	15	5	10	68	49	+19	50	
5	Jiul Petroșani	30	14	7	9	43	29	+14	49 (Note: JIU 0-0 CFR; CFR 1–2 JIU)	
6	CFR Simeria	30	14	7	9	49	34	+15	49	
7	Autocatania Caransebeș	30	14	6	10	46	42	+4	48	
8	Școlar Reșița	30	14	5	11	40	31	+9	47	
9	Național Sebiș	30	11	7	12	36	36	0	40	
10	Vladimirescu	30	12	2	16	44	59	−15	38 (Note: MIL 0-2 VLA; VLA 3–1 MIL)	
11	Millenium Giarmata	30	11	5	14	40	56	−16	38	
12	Unirea Valea lui Mihai	30	11	4	15	40	42	−2	37	
13	Flacăra Făget	30	8	5	17	38	57	−19	29 (Note: FLA: 7 pts, 6–4; NUO: 6 pts, 5–3; GLO: 4 pts, 3–7)	
14	Nuova Mama Mia Becicherecu Mic (R)	30	9	2	19	34	42	−8	29	Relegation to Liga IV
15	Gloria CTP Arad (R)	30	7	8	15	28	45	−17	29	Relegation to Liga IV
16	Gloria Reșița (R)	30	2	5	23	14	92	−78	11	Relegation to Liga IV

Source: FRF (in Romanian)
Rules for classification: 1st points; 2nd head-to-head points; 3rd head-to-head goal difference; 4th head-to-head goals scored; 5th head-to-head away goals scored; 6th goal difference; 7th number of goals scored
(C) Champions; (P) Promoted; (R) Relegated

=== Seria VI ===
Pos	Team	Pld	W	D	L	GF	GA	GD	Pts	Promotion or relegation
1	Corona Brașov (C, P)	30	23	5	2	59	8	+51	74	Promotion to Liga II
2	Olimpia Satu Mare	30	23	2	5	57	22	+35	71	
3	Unirea Tărlungeni	30	18	5	7	55	29	+26	59	
4	FC Zalău	30	16	4	10	44	39	+5	52	
5	Avântul Reghin	30	15	5	10	38	34	+4	50	
6	Seso Câmpia Turzii	30	15	4	11	43	33	+10	49	
7	Unirea Florești	30	15	3	12	47	40	+7	48	
8	Universitatea Cluj II	30	13	6	11	52	38	+14	45	
9	Unirea Ungheni	30	13	2	15	48	54	−6	41	
10	CFR Cluj-Napoca II	30	11	6	13	48	43	+5	39	
11	Sănătatea Cluj	30	10	7	13	44	46	−2	37	
12	Unirea Dej	30	9	6	15	34	52	−18	33	
13	Voinţa Livezile	30	8	7	15	35	47	−12	31	
14	Zlatna (R)	30	6	5	19	25	61	−36	23	Relegation to Liga IV
15	FCM Târgu Mureş II (R)	30	4	4	22	24	69	−45	16	Relegation to Liga IV
16	Gloria Bistriţa II (R)	30	4	3	23	33	71	−38	15	Relegation to Liga IV

Source: FRF (in Romanian)
Rules for classification: 1st points; 2nd head-to-head points; 3rd head-to-head goal difference; 4th head-to-head goals scored; 5th head-to-head away goals scored; 6th goal difference; 7th number of goals scored
(C) Champions; (P) Promoted; (R) Relegated

== See also ==
- 2011–12 Liga I
- 2011–12 Liga II
- 2011–12 Liga IV
