= Alexandru Neacșa =

Romanian footballer

Personal information
- Full name: Ionuț Alexandru Neacșa
- Date of birth: 3 September 1991 (age 35)
- Place of birth: Drăgășani, Romania
- Height: 1.70 m (5 ft 7 in)
- Positions: Midfielder; left-back

Team information
- Current team: Corvinul Hunedoara
- Number: 10

Youth career
- –2009: Școala de Fotbal Gheorghe Popescu

Senior career*
| Years | Team | Apps | (Gls) |
| 2009–2011 | Gaz Metan CFR Craiova | 41 | (4) |
| 2011–2013 | CS Turnu Severin | 53 | (6) |
| 2013–2014 | Corona Brașov | 27 | (1) |
| 2014 | Universitatea Craiova | 3 | (0) |
| 2014–2015 | Viitorul Constanța | 5 | (0) |
| 2015 | Dinamo Minsk | 8 | (1) |
| 2016 | Gaz Metan Mediaș | 7 | (0) |
| 2016–2018 | Hermannstadt | 14 | (0) |
| 2018 | → Luceafărul Oradea (loan) | 13 | (1) |
| 2018–2019 | Energeticianul | 26 | (2) |
| 2019–2021 | 1599 Șelimbăr | 30 | (11) |
| 2022– | Corvinul Hunedoara | 102 | (9) |
- * Club domestic league appearances and goals as of 7 November 2026

Ionuț Alexandru Neacșa (born 3 September 1991) is a Romanian professional footballer who plays as a midfielder or left-back for Liga I club Corvinul Hunedoara.

== Honours ==
Gaz Metan Mediaș

- Liga II: 2015–16

Hermannstadt

- Liga III: 2016–17

Viitorul Șelimbăr

- Liga III: 2020–21

Corvinul Hunedoara

- Liga II: 2025–26
- Liga III: 2021–22, 2022–23
- Cupa României: 2023–24
- Supercupa României runner-up: 2024
