= Alexandru Marc =

Romanian footballer

Personal information
- Full name: Traian Alexandru Marc
- Date of birth: 16 January 1983 (age 43)
- Place of birth: Brașov, Romania
- Height: 1.84 m (6 ft 1/2 in)
- Position: Goalkeeper

Youth career
- FC Brașov

Senior career*
Years	Team	Apps	(Gls)
2002–2005	FC Brașov	15	(0)
2005–2010	Politehnica Iași	19	(0)
2008	→ Forex Brașov (loan)	16	(0)
2010–2014	FC Brașov	14	(0)
2012–2014	→ Corona Brașov (loan)	47	(0)
2014–2015	Dinamo București	23	(0)
2015–2017	CFR Cluj	43	(0)
Total		177	(0)

International career
2004–2005	Romania U21	12	(0)
- * Club domestic league appearances and goals as of 14 June 2017

Traian Alexandru Marc (born 16 January 1983 in Braşov, Romania) is a former Romanian footballer who played as a goalkeeper.

Marc was promoted from FC Brașov's youth team at the beginning of the 2002–03 season of Divizia A. After only 10 league matches in three years he was transferred to Politehnica Iași, where he was the second-choice goalkeeper. He returned to FC Brașov in 2010 and two years later he was loaned to Corona Brașov. In 2014, when his contract with FC Brașov expired, Marc signed a deal for three years with Dinamo București. He was released by Dinamo in 2015 and reached an agreement with CFR Cluj.

Marc is a former U-21 international.

== Honours ==
=== Club ===
CFR Cluj

- Cupa României: 2015–16

=== Individual ===
- Liga I Best goalkeeper: 2015–16 (shared with Branko Grahovac)
