= Vasile Olariu =

Romanian footballer

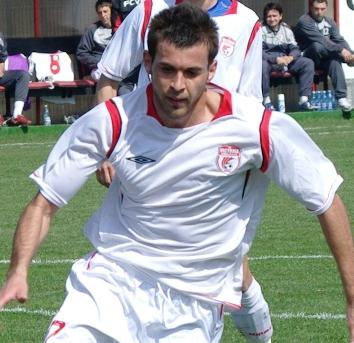

Personal information
- Date of birth: 6 July 1987 (age 39)
- Place of birth: Sânnicolau Mare, Romania
- Height: 1.75 m (5 ft 9 in)
- Position: Attacking midfielder

Youth career
- 2004–2005: Calor Timișoara

Senior career*
| Years | Team | Apps | (Gls) |
| 2005–2006 | Unirea Sânnicolau Mare | 21 | (0) |
| 2006–2008 | Prefab Modelu | 34 | (0) |
| 2008–2009 | Râmnicu Vâlcea | 4 | (0) |
| 2009–2011 | Victoria Brănești | 56 | (25) |
| 2011 | → Oleksandria (loan) | 0 | (0) |
| 2012 | FC Brașov | 14 | (1) |
| 2013 | Corona Brașov | 7 | (0) |
| 2014–2016 | Academica Clinceni | 57 | (8) |
| 2016–2018 | Afumați | 60 | (9) |
| 2018–2020 | Academica Clinceni | 30 | (3) |
| Total | | 283 | (46) |

International career
| 2010 | Romania U23 | 2 | (0) |
- * Club domestic league appearances and goals as of 26 December 2019

Vasile Olariu (born 6 July 1987) is a Romanian football player who plays as a midfielder.

== Career ==
Born near Timișoara, Olariu began playing professional football for local side Unirea Sânnicolau Mare. In 2009, he was transferred to Victoria Brăneşti, where he led the club to promotion to Liga I, scoring 16 goals during the 2009–10 Liga II season. He scored eight of those goals from the penalty spot.

Olariu agreed to a one-year loan to Ukrainian Premier League side PFC Oleksandria in September 2011.

Olariu has played for Romania at the under-23 level, making his debut against Italy in March 2010.

== Honours ==
=== Victoria Brănești ===
- Liga II winner (2009–10)
