= Silviu Ploeșteanu Stadium =

Multi-purpose stadium in Brașov, Romania

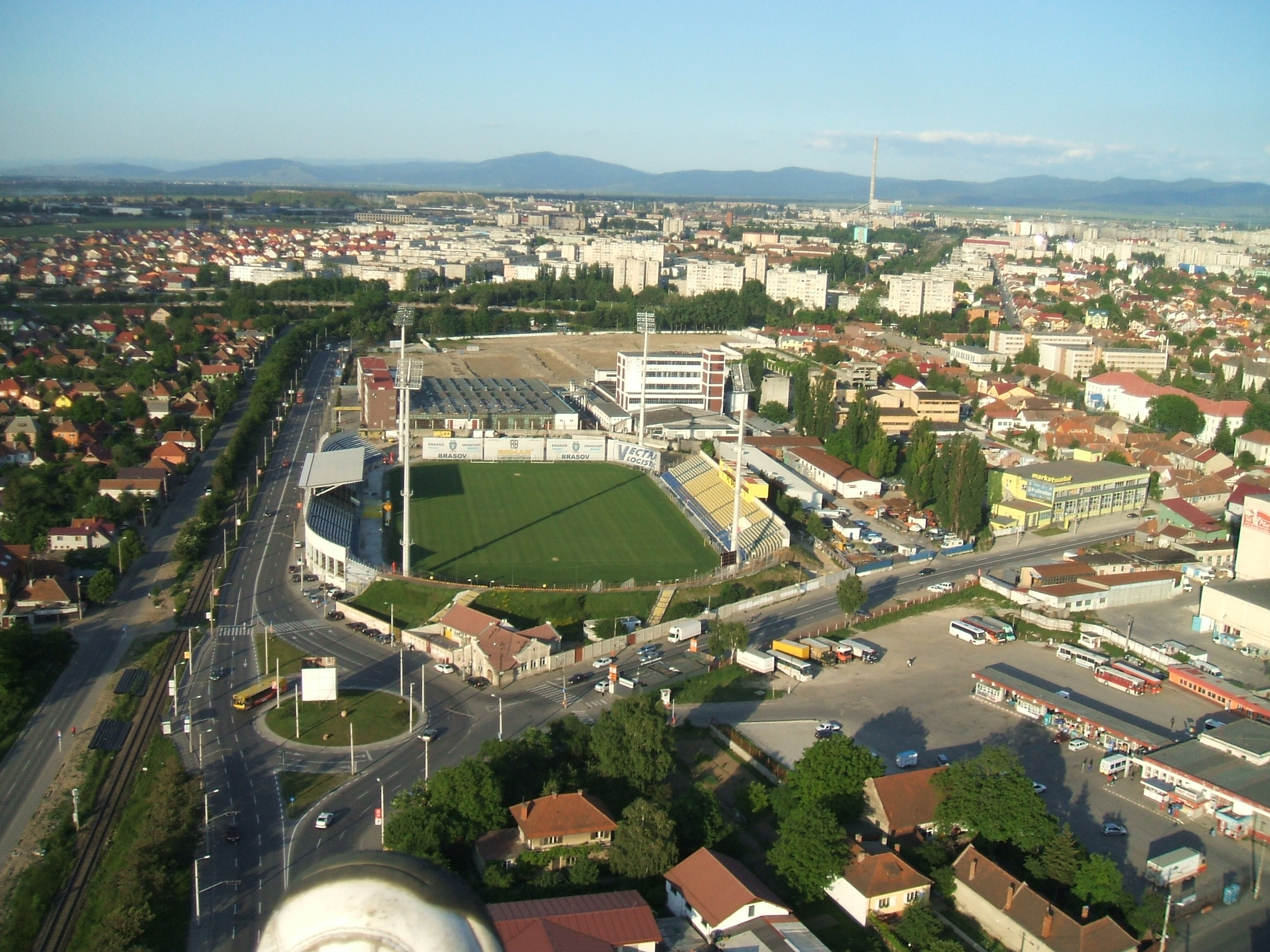
- The venue in 2011
- Interactive map of Silviu Ploeșteanu Stadium
- Former names: Tineretului Stadium(1937–present)
- Address: Str. Stadionului, nr. 1
- Location: Brașov, Romania
- Coordinates: 45°39′53.3″N 25°35′8.1″E
- Owner: Municipality of Brașov
- Operator: SR Brașov
- Capacity: 8,800
- Surface: Grass
- Field size: 105 x 68 metres (114.8 x 74.3 yards)

Construction
- Groundbreaking: 27 August 1933
- Opened: 1937
- Renovated: 1956, 1980, 2001, 2008

Tenants
- SR Brașov (1939–present); Corona Brașov (2013–2014, 2020–2021)

The Silviu Ploeșteanu Stadium, previously known as Tineretului Stadium, is a multi-purpose stadium in Brașov, Romania. It is currently used mostly for football matches and is the home ground of SR Brașov and Corona Brașov. The arena was named after Silviu Ploeșteanu (1913–1969) on 13 April 2002, who managed the club between 1948 and 1968.

The central section of the stadium's North stand is the second-oldest in Romanian football, its lateral sections being completed in 1980. The South stand was built in 1956, and the East and West stands were inaugurated in the 1969–1970 season. The East stand was eventually demolished in the summer of 2008.

== See also ==
- List of football stadiums in Romania

== Gallery ==
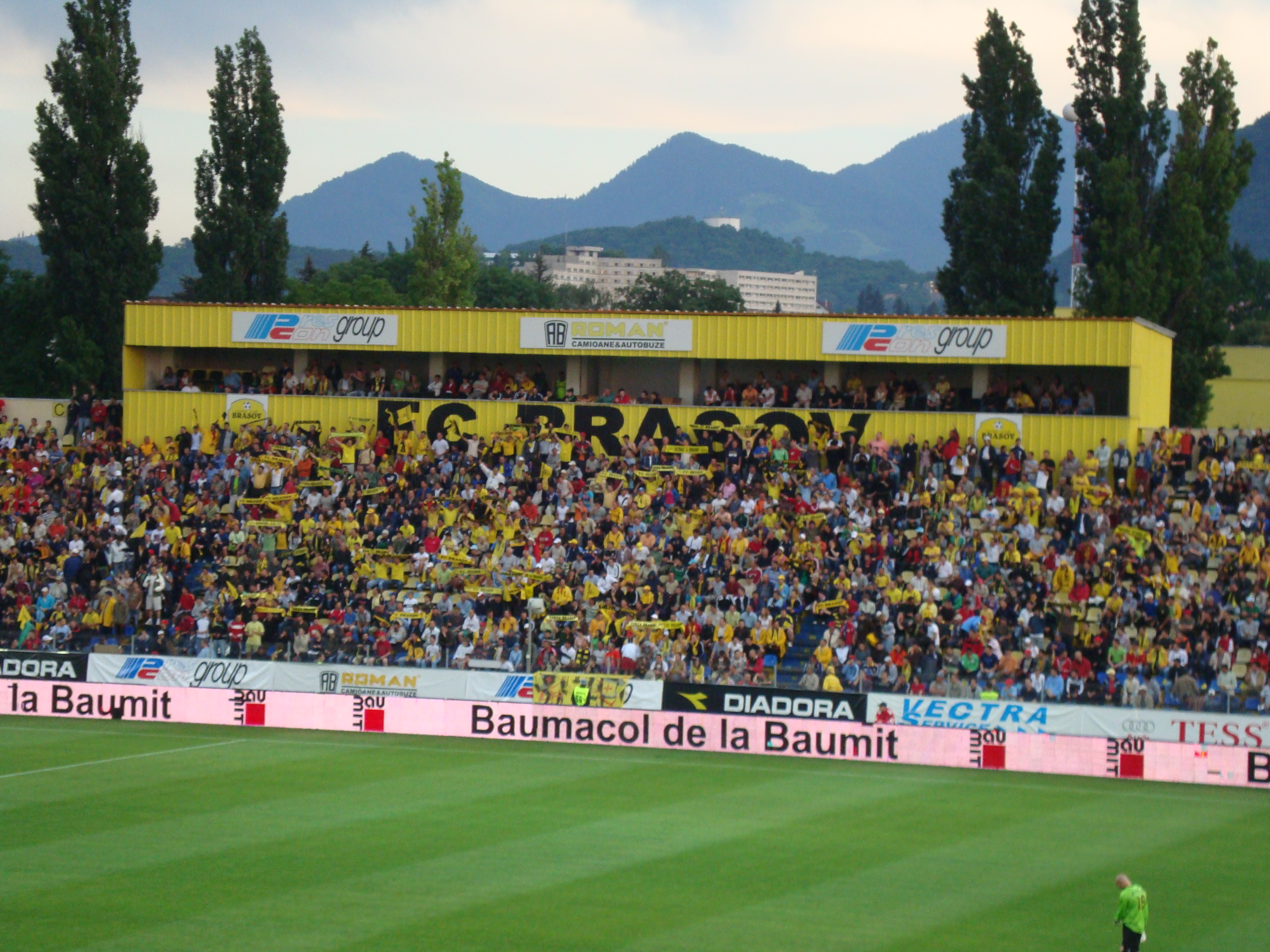
Silviu Ploeșteanu Stadium
The fans

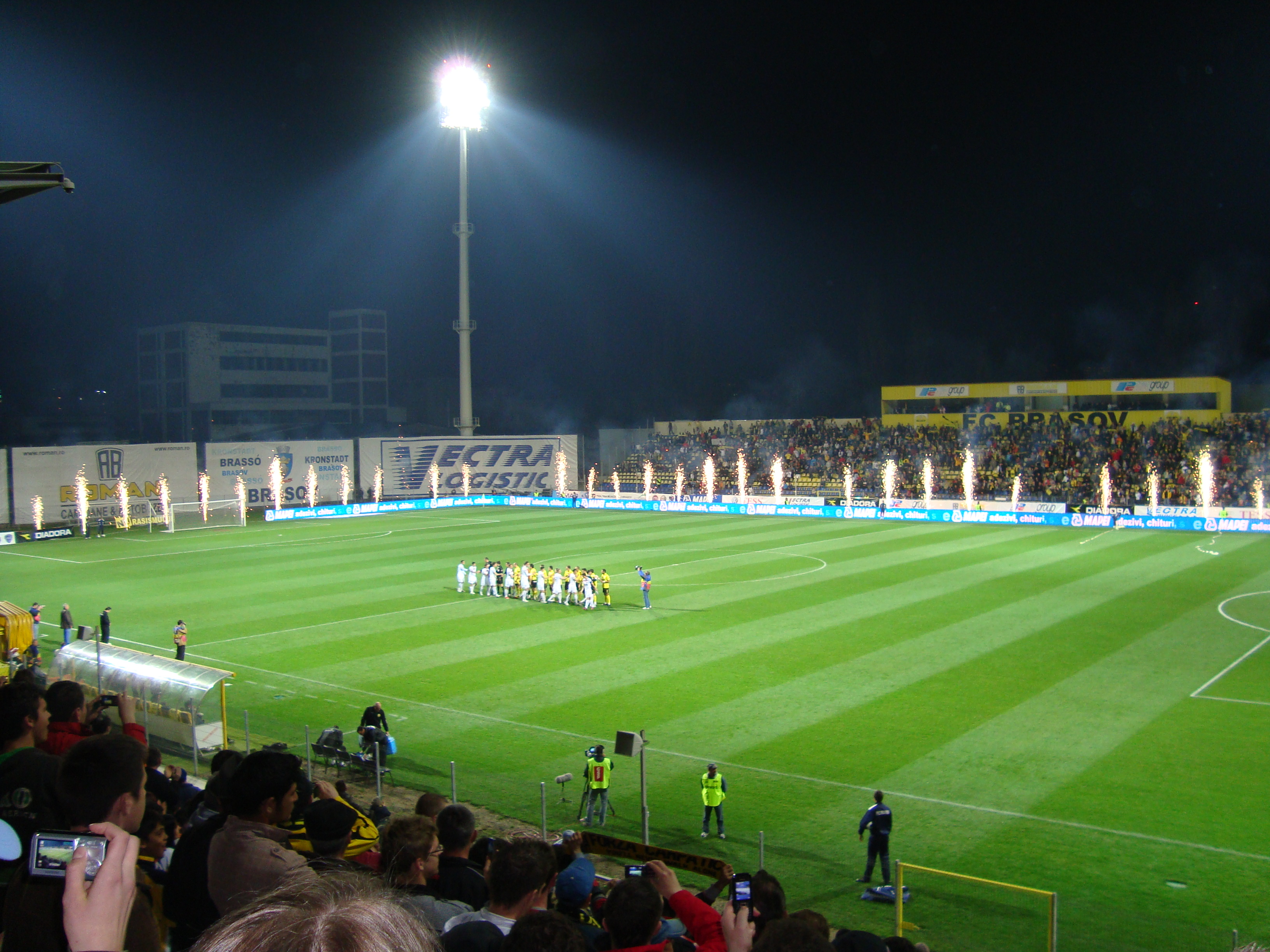
Silviu Ploeșteanu Stadium
floodlight-on
