= Marius Ene =

Romanian biathlete (born 1972)

Personal information
- Nationality: Romanian
- Born: 2 October 1972 (age 52); Sinaia, Romania

Sport
- Sport: Biathlon

Marius Ene (born 2 October 1972) is a Romanian biathlete. He competed in the men's 20 km individual event at the 1998 Winter Olympics.
