= CSM Corona Brașov (football) =

Romanian football club

Corona Brașov
- Full name: Clubul Sportiv Municipal; Corona Brașov
- Short name: Corona
- Founded: 2008 as SCM Brașov; 2019 as Corona Brașov; 2024 (refounded)
- Ground: Metrom
- Capacity: 1,056
- Owner: Brașov Municipality
- Chairman: Ionuț Voicu-Necula
- Manager: Marian Constantinescu
- League: Liga III
- 2025–26: Liga IV, Brașov County, 1st (promoted via play-offs)
- Website: http://www.coronabrasov.ro/
Home colours	Away colours

Clubul Sportiv Municipal Corona Brașov, commonly known as Corona Brașov or simply Corona, is a Romanian football team based in Brașov, Brașov County, currently competing in Liga IV Brașov County, the fourth tier of the Romanian football.

Founded in 2008, the team represents the men's football section of the multi-sport club CSM Corona Brașov that include women's handball, ice hockey, men's basketball, figure skating, alpine skiing, swimming, water polo and women's and men's volleyball sections. Between 2008 and 2013, Corona achieved four promotions in five seasons, advancing from the fifth tier to Liga I, where it spent one season before being relegated.

== History ==
The team was founded in 2008 as the football section of SCM (Sport Club Municipal) Brașov and was enrolled in Liga V Brașov, the fifth tier of the Romanian football league system and the second county-level division, playing its home matches at Carpați Stadium. Under the guidance of Daniel Bona, the Yellow and Blues earned promotion to Liga IV Brașov at the end of the 2008–09 season.

In the following season, the squad, composed of experienced second- and third-division players such as Măuță, Ciolănel and Ailincăi, alongside Dărăbanț, Turcan, Chivu, Dămoc, Postolache, Marin, Kantor, Cîntea, Terciu, Moraru, Marinescu and Chița, secured a second consecutive promotion. SCM won the Liga IV Brașov County title and then defeated Zagon, the Covasna County Championship winners, 2–1 in the promotion play-off held at the neutral Petrolul Stadium in Berca.

Following promotion, the club changed its name to Corona Brașov, reflecting the city's historical identity, as Brașov was known during the Middle Ages by its Latin name Corona and its German name Kronstadt. Assigned to Series VI of Liga III, the team led by Daniel Bona finished fourth in its debut third-tier campaign in 2010–11. One year later, the Yellow and Blues won their series and earned promotion to Liga II for the first time. The squad included, among others, Marc, Dărăbanț, Kajcsa, Martac, Stanciu, G. Ștefan, Potecu, Câmpean, Istrate, Sfrijan, Postolache, Elek, M. Ene, Stere (captain), Vl. Munteanu, Marcăș, Chirciu, Liță and I. Coman.

In the 2012–13 Liga II season, Corona competed in Series II under Daniel Bona, with Aurel Țicleanu joining the club as technical director in April 2013. The Yellow and Blues won the series and secured promotion to Liga I for the first time in the club's history. The squad included, among others, Marc, Dănălache, Martac, G. Ștefan, R. Damian, Burlacu, Avram, Chirciu, Marcăș, Stângă, H. Popa, Fizeșan, I. Coman, M. Ene, Manea, Dâlbea, S. Marin, Pastor, Forika, Leonte, Vl. Munteanu, Stanciu and Marinescu.

The club's first Liga I campaign proved short-lived and was marked by several managerial changes. Corona moved its home matches to Silviu Ploeșteanu Stadium, which it shared with local rivals FC Brașov, and strengthened its squad with players including Sergiu Buș, Vasile Olariu, Alexandru Neacșa, Wilfried Kanon, Florin Ilie, Óscar Arce and Antonio Asanović. Nicolae Manea began the season as head coach but was dismissed after six rounds following a poor start and replaced by Ionel Gane. Gane was himself dismissed late in the campaign and succeeded by Adrian Hârlab, who resigned after three matches, with assistant coach Daniel Bona taking charge for the remainder of the season. Corona finished bottom of the table with 14 points from 34 matches and only two victories.

Only days after the end of the season, Brașov mayor George Scripcaru announced that the football section of the municipally funded club would cease its activities. Football returned to Corona in 2016, initially through a youth development project.

In 2019, a senior team was established again and entered Liga IV Brașov. Led by Călin Moldovan, Corona was second in the standings after 18 rounds when the 2019–20 season was interrupted by the COVID-19 pandemic. Corona subsequently won the county play-off against Colțea Brașov and Precizia Săcele, before securing promotion to Liga III in a promotion tournament held at Ungheni, defeating Gheorgheni 16–0 and Ocna Mureș 5–0. The squad included, among others, Ciuperceanu, Rusu, Manole, Forika, Burlacu, Dumbravă, Alupoaie, Roșu, Leonte, Voicu, Cristescu, C. Ivan, Constantinescu, A. Damian and Buga.

In the 2020–21 Liga III season, Corona won Series V and qualified for the promotion play-offs. The Brașov side defeated Filiași 1–0 away and 4–0 at home in the first round before overcoming Vedița Colonești 2–1 away and 1–0 at home in the decisive round to earn promotion to Liga II. The squad, coached by Călin Moldovan, included Ciuperceanu, Laszlo, Mutu, Rusu, Burlacu, Cîrstian, Dumbravă, Leonte (captain), Linguraru, Nicolau, Alupoaie, Drăgoi, Roșu, Asztalos, Tălmaciu, Argăseală, Manole, Toader, Cristescu, A. Damian and Boția.

However, in the summer of 2021, Corona Brașov ceded its newly earned Liga II place as part of the project that led to the formation of FC Brașov-Steagul Renaște. The process also involved ACS Scotch Club, while the municipality supported the use of the historic FC Brașov identity following the acquisition of the former club's brand during liquidation.

The senior football section was re-established for a third time in the summer of 2024, with former Corona player Marian Constantinescu appointed head coach. The newly formed side competed in Liga IV Brașov and finished eighth in the 2024–25 season. The following campaign marked a rapid change in fortunes, as Corona dominated the 2025–26 Liga IV Brașov season and finished the league campaign unbeaten. The Yellow and Blues also won the county phase of the Cupa României, defeating CSM Făgăraș 1–0 in the final to complete the county double.

As Brașov County champions, Corona faced Sibiu County champions CS Agnita in the promotion play-off for Liga III. A 1–0 away victory in the first leg was followed by a 2–0 win at Carpați Stadium on 27 June 2026, giving Corona a 3–0 aggregate victory and promotion to the third tier for the 2026–27 season.

The club also enjoyed an extended run in the 2026–27 Cupa României. After winning the Brașov county phase, Corona advanced through the regional stage and defeated Viitorul Amo Barcani 5–0 in the Region 3 final, qualifying for the national phase. In the first national round, Corona drew 1–1 with ARO Câmpulung before advancing 5–4 in a penalty shoot-out. The team subsequently defeated CSM Săcele 3–0 in the second round and Olimpic Zărnești 3–1 in the third round, reaching the play-off round of the Cup. As of August 2026, Corona had been drawn to face CS Tunari for a place in the group stage.

== Grounds ==
Until the promotion to the Liga I, Corona played its home matches on the Carpați Stadium but was forced to move from there because it didn't meet the requirements for top football. In the first division, the team shared the Silviu Ploeșteanu Stadium with FC Brașov. In 2016, the club moved again on the Carpați Stadium.

In 2020, Carpați Stadium was demolished and Corona Brașov moved back to Silviu Ploeșteanu Stadium.

== Honours ==
Liga II

- Winners (1): 2012–13

Liga III

- Winners (2): 2011–12, 2020–21

Liga IV – Brașov County

- Winners (3): 2009–10, 2019–20, 2025–26

Liga V – Brașov County

- Winners (1): 2008–09

== League and cup history ==
Season	Tier	League	Place	Notes	Cupa României
2026–27	3	Liga III	TBD		TBD
2025–26	4	Liga IV (BV)	1st (C)	Promoted	
2024–25	4	Liga IV (BV)	8th		County phase - R16
2021–24	Not active				
2020–21	3	Liga III (Series V)	1st (C)	Disbanded	
2019–20	4	Liga IV (BV)	1st (C)	Promoted	
2016–19	Only at youth level				
2014–16	Not active				
2013–14	1	Liga I	18th	Relegated	Round of 16
2012–13	2	Liga II (Series II)	1st (C)	Promoted	Fourth round
2011–12	3	Liga III (Series VI)	1st (C)	Promoted	
2010–11	3	Liga III (Series VI)	4th		
2009–10	4	Liga IV (BV)	1st (C)	Promoted	
2008–09	5	Liga V (BV)	1st (C)	Promoted	

== Notable former players ==
The footballers enlisted below have had international cap(s) for their respective countries at junior and/or senior level and/or more than 50 caps for CSM Corona Brașov.

- (Romania) Valentin Balint
- (Romania) Sergiu Buș
- (Romania) Răzvan Damian
- (Ivory Coast) Wilfried Kanon
- (Romania) Alexandru Marc
- (Romania) Alexandru Tudose

== Former managers ==
- (Romania) Daniel Bona (2009–2013)
- (Romania) Nicolae Manea (2013)
- (Romania) Ionel Gane (2013–2014)
- (Romania) Adrian Hârlab (2014)
- (Romania) Daniel Bona (2014)
- (Romania) Călin Moldovan (2019–2021)

== See also ==
- Colțea Brașov
- Brașovia Brașov
- FC Brașov
- Tractorul Brașov
- CFR Brașov
