= CSM Săcele =

Romanian football club

- Full name: Club Sportiv Municipal Săcele
- Nicknames: Săcelanii (The People from Săcele); Roș-Negrii (The Red and Blacks); Precizia
- Founded: 1950; 76 years ago
- Ground: Electroprecizia
- Capacity: 2,000
- Owners: Săcele Municipality
- General manager: Dragoș Lungu
- Manager: Marian Cristescu
- League: Liga III
- 2025–26: Liga III, Seria IV, 9th
Home colours	Away colours

Club Sportiv Municipal Săcele is a Romanian football club from Săcele, Brașov County, founded in 1950. They currently compete in the Liga IV, rejoining senior competitions from the 2013–14 season, after they retired from the Liga III during the 2008–09 season due to financial reasons.

== History ==
In the year 1950, the team of the Electroprecizia Factory from the City of Săcele (Brașov County) was established, under the name of Fotbal Club Precizia Săcele.

In the 1950–51 season, the newly founded team makes its first appearance in the Romanian football competitions, starting to play in the Regional League of Brașov County (at the time, Stalin Region), also known as Divizia D – Brașov (a group of the Romanian Fourth League, belonging to Brașov County). This is the league where the only team from the City of Săcele will continue to play for the next 20 years, among other teams from the County of Braşov, registering average results.

In the 1972–73 season, Precizia Săcele finishes on first place in the league and obtains a promotion to Division C, the Romanian Third League, achieving its first major success. In the 1973–74 season, it makes its debut in the Romanian Third League, finishing on fifth place of the table.

In the 1981–82 season, the club becomes the champion of the Third League, finishing on the first place of the table, and registers the second major success, by winning the promotion to Division B, the Romanian Second League. At its debut in the Second League, in the 1982–83 season, it is unable to avoid relegation, finishing on the last place of the table.

Therefore, in the 1983–84 season, it returns to the Third League, where it will play until the 1991–92 season when it finishes in seventh place in the table, but it relegates to the Fourth League, as a result of the reduction of the number of teams playing in the Third League. After three years, Precizia Săcele promotes to the Third League, in the 1994–95 season, after finishing in first place in the table.

Only one year later, in the 1995–96 season, the club wins the promotion to the Second League, after finishing on the first place of the table. The next season will mark the third major success and the best performance in the history of the team, Precizia Săcele finishing on the second place of the table in the Second League, being very close to win the promotion to Division A, the Romanian First League. After five years spent in the Second League, in the 2000–01 season, the club finishes on the penultimate place of the table in the Second League and relegates to the Third League.

The next season, the team is very close to return to the Second League, finishing on the second place of the table in its league, but it will win the promotion to the Second League just one year later, in the 2002–03 season, when it finishes on the first place of the table in the Third League.

In the 1983–84 season, the team achieves its best performance in the Romanian Cup, winning all ten preliminary rounds, played against other teams from Brașov County, and reaching to the round of the Sixteen Finals, where it is eliminated by Dinamo Brașov, which wins the match with the score of 1–0. Later on, the team was coached by Ferencz Bajko.

Precizia Săcele logo

In the 2006–07 season, the team changes its name to Fotbal Club Săcele, as the most important sponsor, the Factory Electroprecizia, withdrew its financial support and ceded the stadium and the playing field in the property of the local authorities. As a result, the Municipality became the most important supporter of the team FC Săcele and the owner of the stadium, playing field and training base situated nearby. The local stadium, where the team plays its home matches, is called the Electroprecizia Stadium and has a total capacity of 3,500 seats. The club is one of the teams with tradition from Brașov County and last time played in the Liga III, in the 2008–09 season, rejoining senior competitions from the 2013–14 season, in the Liga V, as Fotbal Club Precizia Săcele. From 2015 to 2016 the team is playing Liga IV and won 2 Romania's Cup 2018 and 2019.

== Honours ==
=== Leagues ===
Liga II

- Runners-up (1): 1996–97

Liga III

- Winners (2): 1981–82, 1995–96
- Runners-up (2): 2001–02, 2002–03

Liga IV – Brașov County

- Winners (3): 1972–73, 1992–93, 1994–95
- Runners-up (1): 2018–19

=== Cups ===
Cupa României – Brașov County

- Winners (2): 2017–18, 2018–19

== Club officials ==
=== Board of directors ===
Role	Name
Owner	(Romania) Săcele Municipality
President	(Romania) Drgaoș Lungu
General manager	(Romania) Aurel Bărbuță

=== Current technical staff ===
Role	Name
Manager	(Romania) Marian Cristescu
Technical Director	(Romania) Ioan Nagy

== League history ==
Season	Tier	Division	Place	Notes	Cupa României
2026–27	3	Liga III (Seria II)	TBD		
2025–26	3	Liga III (Seria IV)	9th		
2024–25	4	Liga IV (BV)	1st (C, P)	Promoted	
2023–24	4	Liga IV (BV)	3rd		
2020–21	4	Liga IV (BV)	5th (R)	Relegated	
2019–20	4	Liga IV (BV)	3rd		Second round
2018–19	4	Liga IV (BV)	2nd		Second round
2017–18	4	Liga IV (BV)	3rd		
2016–17	4	Liga IV (BV)	4th		
2015–16	4	Liga IV (BV)	5th		
2008–09	3	Liga III (Seria III)	16th (R)	Relegated	
2007–08	2	Liga II (Seria I)	18th (R)	Relegated	Round of 32
2006–07	2	Liga II (Seria I)	13th		
2005–06	2	Divizia B (Seria I)	6th		
2004–05	2	Divizia B (Seria I)	10th		
2003–04	2	Divizia B (Seria I)	11th		
2002–03	3	Divizia C (Seria VII)	2nd (P)	Promoted	
2001–02	3	Divizia C (Seria VII)	2nd		
2000–01	2	Divizia B (Seria I)	17th (R)	Relegated	
1999–00	2	Divizia B (Seria I)	14th		
1998–99	2	Divizia B (Seria I)	8th		
1997–98	2	Divizia B (Seria I)	9th		

Season	Tier	Division	Place	Notes	Cupa României
1996–97	2	Divizia B (Seria I)	2nd		
1995–96	3	Divizia C (Seria III)	1st (C, P)	Promoted	
1994–95	4	Divizia D (BV)	1st (C, P)	Promoted	
1992–93	4	Divizia D (BV)	1st (C)		
1991–92	3	Divizia C (Seria VIII)	7th (R)	Relegated	
1990–91	3	Divizia C (Seria VI)	6th		
1989–90	3	Divizia C (Seria VIII)	7th		
1988–89	3	Divizia C (Seria X)	8th		
1987–88	3	Divizia C (Seria XII)	10th		
1986–87	3	Divizia C (Seria XII)	7th		
1985–86	3	Divizia C (Seria XII)	13th		
1984–85	3	Divizia C (Seria XII)	13th		
1983–84	3	Divizia C (Seria XII)	4th		Round of 32
1982–83	2	Divizia B (Seria II)	18th (R)	Relegated	
1981–82	3	Divizia C (Seria XII)	1st (C, P)	Promoted	
1980–81	3	Divizia C (Seria XII)	12th		
1979–80	3	Divizia C (Seria XII)	4th		
1978–79	3	Divizia C (Seria XII)	10th		
1977–78	3	Divizia C (Seria XI)	7th		
1976–77	3	Divizia C (Seria XI)	12th		
1975–76	3	Divizia C (Seria XII)	10th		
1974–75	3	Divizia C (Seria XII)	3rd		
1973–74	3	Divizia C (Seria XII)	5th		
1972–73	4	Divizia D (BV)	1st (C, P)	Promoted	

== Former managers ==
- (Romania) Adrian Szabo (1992–1994)
- (Romania) Marin Barbu (1994–1997)
- (Romania) Daniel Bona (2003–2006)
- (Romania) Daniel Isăilă (2006–2007)
- (Romania) Cosmin Bodea (2007–2008)
