= 2012–13 Liga II =

Liga II
- Season: 2012–13
- Promoted: FC Botoșani; Săgeata Năvodari; Corona Brașov; ACS Poli Timișoara
- Relegated: Chindia Târgovişte; Dinamo II București; FCM Bacău; Callatis Mangalia; Astra II Giurgiu; FC Maramureş; Unirea Alba Iulia; Voinţa Sibiu; Politehnica Timișoara; FC Olt Slatina
- Top goalscorer: 18 Clement Palimaru (Seria I); 12 Albert Voinea (Seria II)

The 2012–13 Liga II is the 73rd season of the Liga II, the second tier of the Romanian football league system. The first two teams in each series will promote at the end of the season to the Liga I, and the last five in each series will relegate to the Liga III, instead of three, like the previous season, because the 2013–14 season will have 2 series of 14 teams each.

== League tables ==
=== Seria I ===
| Pos | Team | Pld | W | D | L | GF | GA | GD | Pts | Promotion or relegation |
|---|---|---|---|---|---|---|---|---|---|---|
| 1 | Botoșani (C, P) | 24 | 17 | 2 | 5 | 47 | 19 | +28 | 53 | Promotion to Liga I |
| 2 | Săgeata Năvodari (P) | 24 | 14 | 4 | 6 | 43 | 29 | +14 | 46 | Promotion to Liga I |
| 3 | Delta Tulcea | 24 | 12 | 6 | 6 | 45 | 22 | +23 | 42 | |
| 4 | Otopeni | 24 | 12 | 5 | 7 | 37 | 27 | +10 | 41 | |
| 5 | CF Brăila | 24 | 12 | 4 | 8 | 39 | 35 | +4 | 40 | |
| 6 | Buftea | 24 | 9 | 5 | 10 | 34 | 38 | −4 | 32 | |
| 7 | Unirea Slobozia | 24 | 7 | 9 | 8 | 35 | 38 | −3 | 30 | |
| 8 | Sportul Studențesc | 24 | 9 | 1 | 14 | 28 | 58 | −30 | 28 (Note: SPO 1-0 DUN; DUN 1–2 SPO) | |
| 9 | Dunărea Galați | 24 | 8 | 4 | 12 | 23 | 30 | −7 | 28 | |
| 10 | Rapid CFR Suceava | 24 | 7 | 6 | 11 | 31 | 35 | −4 | 27 (Note: RAP 2-1 FAR; FAR 1–2 RAP) | |
| 11 | Farul Constanța | 24 | 8 | 3 | 13 | 35 | 41 | −6 | 27 | |
| 12 | Chindia Târgoviște (R) | 24 | 7 | 5 | 12 | 33 | 41 | −8 | 26 | Relegation to Liga III |
| 13 | Dinamo II București (R) | 24 | 5 | 4 | 15 | 27 | 44 | −17 | 19 | Relegation to Liga III |
| 14 | FCM Bacău (Note: FCM Bacău withdrew from the championship after round 1 of the season.) (R) | 0 | 0 | 0 | 0 | 0 | 0 | 0 | 0 | Relegation to Liga III |
| 15 | Callatis Mangalia (Note: Callatis Mangalia announced its withdrawal from the championship just 4 days before the start.) (R) | 0 | 0 | 0 | 0 | 0 | 0 | 0 | 0 | Relegation to Liga III |
| 16 | Astra II Giurgiu (Note: Astra II Giurgiu didn't register for the new season because it was dissolved by its owner.) (R) | 0 | 0 | 0 | 0 | 0 | 0 | 0 | 0 | Relegation to Liga III |

Source: FRF (in Romanian)
Rules for classification: 1st points; 2nd head-to-head points; 3rd head-to-head goal difference; 4th head-to-head goals scored; 5th head-to-head away goals scored; 6th goal difference; 7th number of goals scored
(C) Champions; (P) Promoted; (R) Relegated

=== Seria II ===
| Pos | Team | Pld | W | D | L | GF | GA | GD | Pts | Promotion or relegation |
|---|---|---|---|---|---|---|---|---|---|---|
| 1 | Corona Brașov (C, P) | 24 | 14 | 6 | 4 | 41 | 22 | +19 | 48 | Promotion to Liga I |
| 2 | ACS Poli Timișoara (P) | 24 | 12 | 9 | 3 | 39 | 19 | +20 | 45 | Promotion to Liga I |
| 3 | Damila Măciuca | 24 | 13 | 5 | 6 | 38 | 22 | +16 | 44 | |
| 4 | UTA Arad | 24 | 11 | 7 | 6 | 29 | 17 | +12 | 40 | |
| 5 | Târgu Mureș | 24 | 10 | 5 | 9 | 31 | 29 | +2 | 35 | |
| 6 | Râmnicu Vâlcea | 24 | 10 | 4 | 10 | 27 | 28 | −1 | 34 | |
| 7 | Bihor Oradea | 24 | 8 | 9 | 7 | 35 | 31 | +4 | 33 | |
| 8 | Mioveni | 24 | 7 | 11 | 6 | 27 | 23 | +4 | 32 | |
| 9 | Argeș Pitești | 24 | 9 | 4 | 11 | 34 | 40 | −6 | 31 | |
| 10 | Luceafărul Oradea | 24 | 6 | 8 | 10 | 25 | 32 | −7 | 26 | |
| 11 | Olt Slatina (Note: The 11th-placed team Olt Slatina is the successor of the former Alro Slatina club.) | 24 | 4 | 10 | 10 | 27 | 29 | −2 | 22 | |
| 12 | FCMU Baia Mare (Note: FCMU Baia Mare was docked 2 points because of debts owed to Dragoş Petrică.) (R) | 24 | 5 | 8 | 11 | 21 | 36 | −15 | 21 | Relegation to Liga III |
| 13 | Unirea Alba Iulia (Note: Unirea Alba Iulia withdrew from the championship during the winter break and lost all remaining matches with 0-3.) (R) | 24 | 3 | 2 | 19 | 12 | 58 | −46 | 11 | Relegation to Liga III |
| 14 | Voința Sibiu (Note: Voinţa Sibiu withdrew from the championship after round 11 and all of its results were cancelled.) (R) | 0 | 0 | 0 | 0 | 0 | 0 | 0 | 0 | Relegation to Liga III |
| 15 | Politehnica Timișoara (Note: Politehnica Timișoara was excluded from the championship by FRF based on art. 24 let. C.1 of RSTJF.) (R) | 0 | 0 | 0 | 0 | 0 | 0 | 0 | 0 | Relegation to Liga III |
| 16 | Olt Slatina (2009) (Note: Olt Slatina (2009) did not register for the new season because it was dissolved.) (R) | 0 | 0 | 0 | 0 | 0 | 0 | 0 | 0 | Relegation to Liga III |

Source: FRF (in Romanian)
Rules for classification: 1st points; 2nd head-to-head points; 3rd head-to-head goal difference; 4th head-to-head goals scored; 5th head-to-head away goals scored; 6th goal difference; 7th number of goals scored
(C) Champions; (P) Promoted; (R) Relegated

== Goals ==
10 goals

- (Romania) Daniel Florea (Delta Tulcea)

9 goals

- (Romania) Marius Ene (Corona Braşov)

4 goals

- (Romania) Cristian Silvăşan (UTA Arad)

== See also ==
- 2012–13 Liga I
- 2012–13 Liga III
