= ASC Ciucaș Tărlungeni =

Romanian football club

Ciucaș Tărlungeni
- Full name: Asociația Sport Club; Ciucaș Tărlungeni
- Short name: Ciucaș
- Founded: 1983; 43 years ago as Unirea Tărlungeni; 2016; 10 years ago as Inter Tărlungeni
- Ground: Comunal
- Capacity: 1,000
- Owner: Tărlungeni Commune
- Chairman: Marius Bădițoiu
- Manager: Vasile Gherghe
- League: Liga IV
- 2024–25: Liga III, Seria VI, 10th (relegated)
Home colours	Away colours

Asociația Sport Club Ciucaș Tărlungeni, commonly known as Ciucaș Tărlungeni, simply as Ciucaș, is a professional football club based in Tărlungeni, Brașov County, founded in 1983 under the name of Unirea Tărlungeni and which is currently playing in the Liga III, the third tier of Romanian football.

For most of its existence, Ciucaș has been a constant presence in the 4th tier of the Romanian football league system. At its best, the team from Brașov County reached the second division, where it played for four seasons. In the 2016–17 season, due to financial difficulties, the team was relocated to Ștefăneștii de Jos, Ilfov County, but the club could not be financially saved.

In the same year, to continue the football tradition in Tărlungeni, Inter Tărlungeni was founded, later renamed Ciucaș Tărlungeni in 2018, and by 2023, the club once again reached the national leagues.

== History ==
Former logo, used until 2016.

The club was founded in 1983 as Unirea Tărlungeni and competed in the Brașov County Championships for twenty-four years. Unirea earned promotion to Liga III at the end of the 2006–07 season. Led by Daniel Bona, the team won the Divizia D – Brașov County title and secured promotion after a play-off match against Viscofil Popești-Leordeni, the Divizia D – Ilfov County winner, with a 2–1 victory after extra time at Poiana Stadium in Poiana Câmpina.

Unirea finished in 10th place in its debut season in the third league. In the following season, Daniel Bona was dismissed in September and replaced by Decebal Cîmpeanu, who led the team to a 9th-place finish and 10th in the following campaign.

In 2010, the team was taken over by former Unirea Urziceni player László Balint. After six seasons in the third division, in 2013 Unirea Tărlungeni finished 1st in the sixth series of the competition and earned promotion to Liga II for the first time in its history.

On 18 September 2013 Unirea Tărlungeni was defeated by former national champion Rapid București, relegated to the second echelon by decision of the Court of Arbitration for Sport in Lausanne for financial reasons and after a barrage of maintaining played with Concordia Chiajna with the score 0 -1, at home in a match counting for the third stage of the second league. It was a first for Tărlungeni football club in the first match being televised encounter a team of Romanian football tradition, with numerous participations in European cups and titles.

In the summer of 2016, Unirea Tărlungeni was moved from Tărlungeni to Ștefăneștii de Jos, but the club could not be financially saved. In the same year 2016, the football club from Tărlungeni was re-founded, under the name of Ciucaș Tărlungeni, and in 2023 reached again the national leagues.

== Honours ==
Liga III

- Winners (1): 2012–13

Liga IV – Brașov County

- Winners (2): 2005–06, 2006–07
- Runners-up (1): 2004–05

== Players ==
=== First team squad ===
As of 10 September 2024

Note: Flags indicate national team as defined under FIFA eligibility rules; some limited exceptions apply. Players may hold more than one non-FIFA nationality.

No.	Pos.	Nation	Player
1	GK	ROU	George Gană
2	DF	ROU	Andrei Lenghen
3	MF	ROU	Dacian Moșoiu
4	DF	ROU	Vlad Moldovan
5	MF	ROU	Vlad Lupu
6	DF	ROU	Arnold Komaromi
7	MF	ROU	Rareș Colțofeanu (Captain)
8	MF	ROU	Claudiu Pătrașcu
10	MF	ROU	Rareș Constantin
11	MF	ROU	Robert Enache
14	MF	ROU	Daniel Forsner
15	MF	ROU	Daniel Dumitru

No.	Pos.	Nation	Player
17	DF	ROU	Victor Cantău
18	FW	ROU	Alexandru Păun
19	MF	ROU	Alex Mitroi
20	DF	ROU	Laurențiu Galborcea
24	MF	ROU	Dario Lazar
27	DF	ROU	Ștefan Hlipca
37	MF	ROU	Daniel Ene
47	DF	ROU	Grigore Voicu
77	MF	ROU	Bogdan Tăgârță
83	MF	ROU	Marius Nicodim
93	MF	ROU	Andrei Prescură
98	FW	ROU	Darius Rășinaru

=== Out on loan ===
Note: Flags indicate national team as defined under FIFA eligibility rules; some limited exceptions apply. Players may hold more than one non-FIFA nationality.

No. / Pos. / Nation / Player	No. / Pos. / Nation / Player

== Club officials ==
=== Board of directors ===
Role	Name
Owner	(Romania) Tărlungeni Commune
President	(Romania) Marius Bădițoiu

=== Current technical staff ===
Role	Name
Manager	(Romania) Vasile Gherghe
Fitness coach	(Romania) Andrei Lengthen

== League history ==
Season	Tier	Division	Place	Notes	Cupa României
2024–25	3	Liga III (Seria VI)	10th	Relegated	First round
2023–24	3	Liga III (Seria V)	10th	Spared from (R)	
2022–23	4	Liga IV (BV)	1st (C)	Promoted	
2016–17	2	Liga II	18th	Relegated	Round of 32
2015–16	2	Liga II	11th		Round of 32
2014–15	2	Liga II	4th		
2013–14	2	Liga II	9th		
2012–13	3	Liga III	1st (C)	Promoted	

Season	Tier	Division	Place	Notes	Cupa României
2011–12	3	Liga III	3rd		
2010–11	3	Liga III	6th		
2009–10	3	Liga III	10th		
2008–09	3	Liga III	9th		
2007–08	3	Liga III	10th		
2006–07	4	Liga IV (BV)	1st (C)	Promoted	
2005–06	4	Liga IV (BV)	1st (C)		

== Former managers ==
- (Romania) Daniel Bona (2006–2008)
- (Romania) Decebal Cîmpeanu (2008–2010)
- (Romania) László Balint (2010–2014)
- (Romania) Daniel Bona (2014–2016)
- (Romania) Laurențiu Tudor (2016)
