= SR Brașov =

Romanian football club

- Full name: Asociația Club Sportiv; SR Municipal Brașov
- Nicknames: Stegarii (The Flag-bearers); Galben-negrii (The Yellow-Blacks); Copiii Orașului (City's children); Echipa de sub Tâmpa (The Tâmpa Team)
- Short name: SR, Steagu'
- Founded: 2017; 9 years ago
- Ground: Silviu Ploeșteanu
- Capacity: 8,800
- Owner: The Flag-bearers Supporters League
- Head coach: Liviu Nicolae
- League: Liga IV
- 2025–26: Liga IV, Brașov County, 7th
- Website: http://srbrasov.ro/
Home colours	Away colours

Asociația Club Sportiv SR Municipal Brașov (Romanian pronunciation: [braˈʃov]), commonly known as SR Brașov or simply Brașov, is a Romanian football club based in the city of Brașov, Brașov County, which competes in the Liga III.

The team was created in 2017 by the supporters of the original FC Brașov, which was dissolved that year. "SR" stands for Steagul Roșu ("the Red Flag") or Steagul Renaște ("Steagul Reborn").

Meanwhile, another entity was founded in 2021 and gained permission to use the FC Brașov brand, although it has a continuity issue and enjoys lower fan support.

== History ==
=== Insolvency and bankruptcy of FC Brașov ===
In the spring of 2015 FC Brașov had financial problems and went into insolvency. In the summer of 2015 all the team's players changed and the target was promotion to Liga I. But by the end of the season they were in 5th place, outside the promotion places.

In the summer of 2016 the team did not have the budget needed to participate in Liga II and financial problems continued to multiply. The situation was saved with a few weeks before the start of the new season when Alexandru Chipciu, a former player of the team, was sold by Fotbal Club FCSB to Anderlecht and FC Brașov received a stake in the transfer. Cornel Țălnar was named the new manager and the goal was still promotion, considered the only financial recovery solution of the club. The team started well, but finished the season in 7th place.

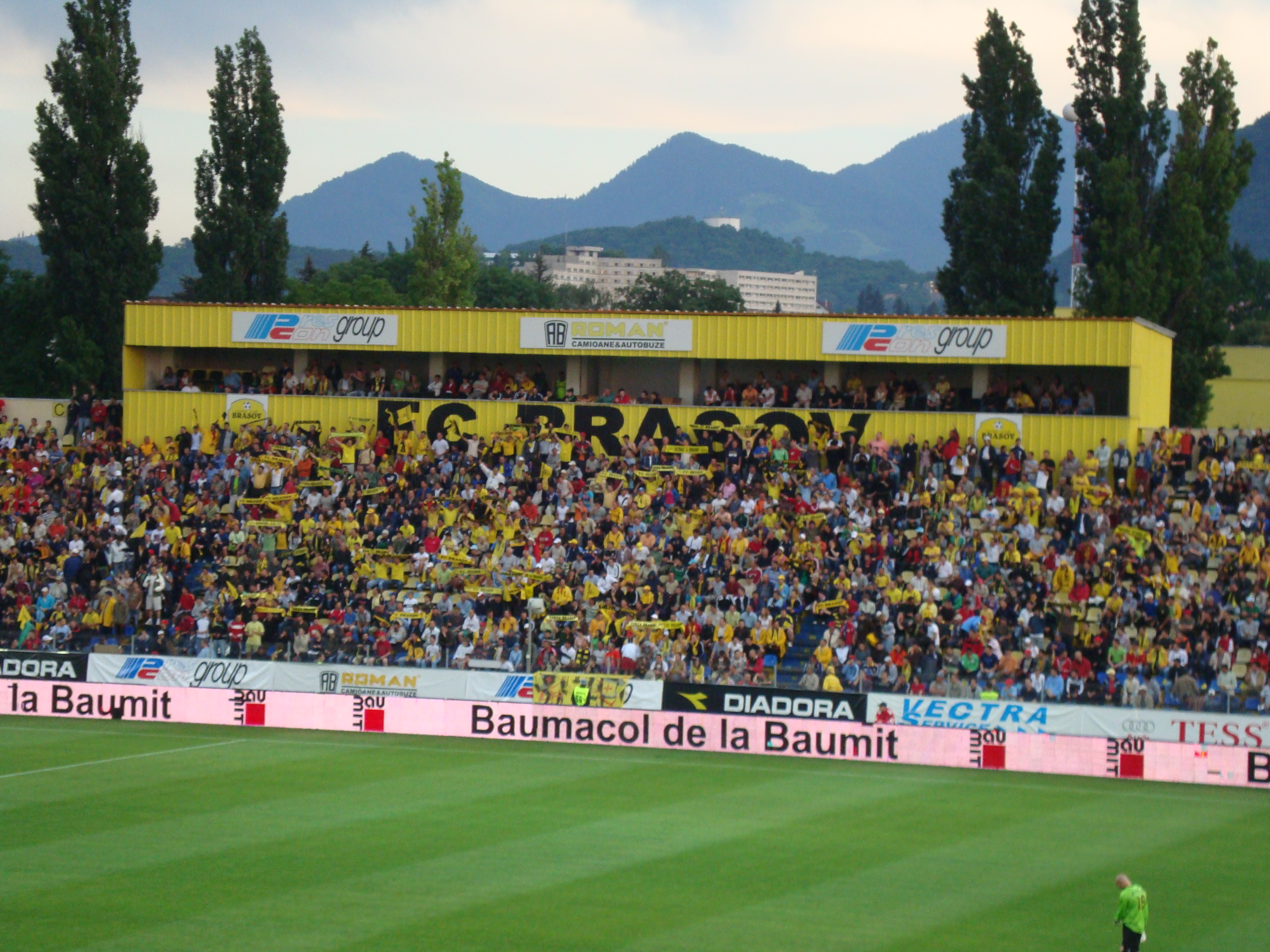
FC Braşov supporters.

After the end of the championship, FC Brașov announced that the team will not join the new season of Liga II, and was declared bankrupt.

=== Establishment of SR Brașov ===
In the summer of 2017 The Flag-bearers Supporters League announced the establishment of AS SR (meaning: Asociația Sportivă Steagul Roșu – The Red Flag Sporting Association) Brașov, club set up by the model followed by FC Vaslui, Petrolul Ploiești, Oțelul Galați or Farul Constanța, big clubs in Romanian football which were also dissolved and brought back to life by their supporters.

In the summer of 2021, Corona Brașov merged with ACS Scotch Club (FC Brașov brand bearer) and established FC Brașov (2021). The supporters refused to support the new project.

== Stadium ==
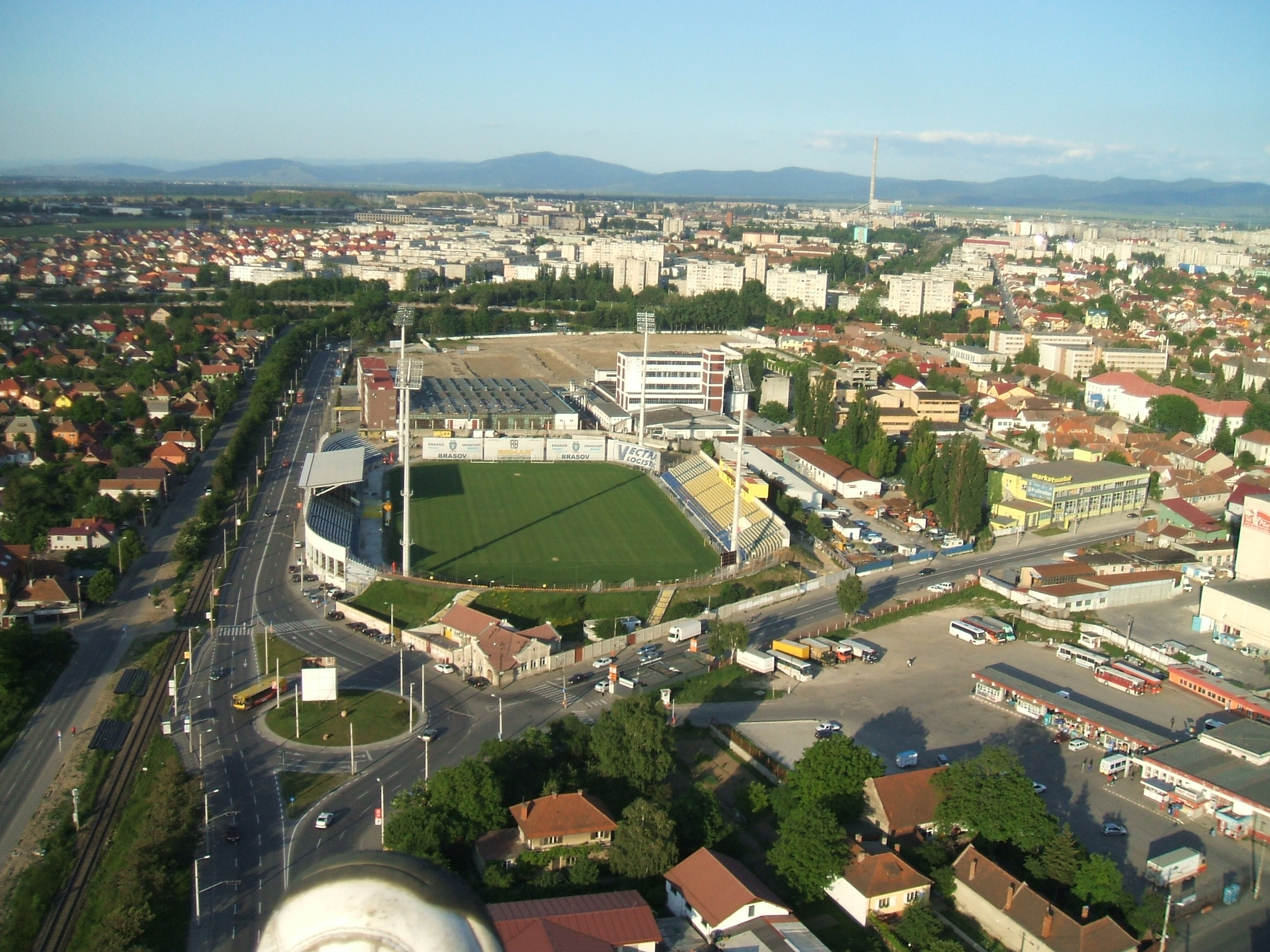
Stadionul Silviu Ploeșteanu.

The club plays its home matches on Stadionul Silviu Ploeșteanu from Brașov, a stadium with a capacity of 8,800 seats, the biggest of Brașov County.

== Support ==
SR Brașov has many supporters in Brașov County. The ultras groups of SR Brașov are organized in The Flag-bearers Supporters League and they have friendly relations with F.C. Universitatea Cluj supporters.

== Honours ==
=== Domestic ===
==== Leagues ====
- Liga III
  - Runners-up (1): 2020–21
- Liga IV – Brașov County
  - Winners (1): 2017–18

== League history ==
Season	Tier	Division	Place	Cupa României
2024–25	3	Liga III (Seria VI)	3rd (R)	
2023–24	3	Liga III (Seria V)	9th	
2022–23	3	Liga III (Seria V)	3rd	
2021–22	3	Liga III (Seria V)	8th	

Season	Tier	Division	Place	Cupa României
2020–21	3	Liga III (Seria V)	2nd	
2019–20	3	Liga III (Seria III)	11th	
2018–19	3	Liga III (Seria III)	8th	
2017–18	4	Liga IV (BV)	1st (C, P)	
