= List of FC Brașov (1936) players =

This is a list of players who have played for FC Brașov.

== Nationality ==
=== Romania ===
Name	Nationality	Pos	Born	Period	Apps	Goals
Octavian Abrudan	Romania	DF	16.03.1984	2008–2010	52	6
Stere Adamache	Romania	GK	17.08.1941	1963–1977	248	0
Bogdan Andone	Romania	MF	07.01.1975	1994	7	0
Alexandru Andraşi	Romania	FW	13.05.1965	1986–1991; 2000–2002		
Florin Anghel	Romania	FW	31.08.1977	2006–2007	24	4
Stelian Anghel	Romania	FW	07.03.1952	1972–1974	54	12
Teodor Anghelini	Romania	DF	09.03.1954	1971–1974	70	2
Dorin Arcanu	Romania	GK	29.03.1970	2000–2003	41	0
Valeriu Aristan	Romania	DF	13.04.1982	2006–2007	6	0
Lorin Avădanei	Romania	DF	22.02.1956	1986–1988	66	13
Ionuţ Badea	Romania	MF	14.10.1975	2001–2002	7	0
Valentin Badea	Romania	FW	23.10.1982	2010	10	1
Mihai Baicu	Romania	FW	21.09.1975	2003–2004	17	6
László Balint	Romania	DF	29.03.1979	2001–2005	65	1
Radu Barbu	Romania	DF	29.08.1989	2012–present	0	0
Valentin Bădoi	Romania	MF	16.12.1975	2010	11	0
Daniel Bălaşa	Romania	DF	06.08.1981	2002; 2010	12	0
Cristian Bălgrădean	Romania	GK	21.03.1988	2007–2008	3	0
Alexandru Bălţoi	Romania	FW	21.06.1982	2008	2	0
Marius Benciu	Romania	MF	12.08.1979			
Alexandru Benga	Romania	MF	15.06.1989	2006–2007	11	0
Cosmin Bodea	Romania	DF	12.06.1973	1995–1996; 1999–2007	22; 149	1; 10
Sergiu Brujan	Romania	MF	14.03.1976	1993–1994; 2004–2005	2; 32	0; 1
Mugurel Buga	Romania	FW	16.12.1977	1996–2005; 2008–2009; 2011–present	199; 12; 59	47; 1; 14
Cornel Buta	Romania	DF	01.11.1977	1996-1999; 2001	88; 26	6; 0
Costin Caraman	Romania	FW	20.10.1971	1994-1995; 1996	34	4
Ionel Chebac	Romania	MF	30.09.1967	1997	3	0
Marius Cheregi	Romania	MF	04.10.1967	1996–1997	26	2
Alexandru Chipciu	Romania	MF	18.05.1989	2006–2011	74	13
Ionuţ Chirciu	Romania	MF	01.11.1983	2005	1	0
Iulian Chiriţă	Romania	MF	02.02.1967	1990–1992; 1996	44; 6	4; 1
Sorin Cigan	Romania	FW	29.05.1964	1987–1990	57	15
Ionel Cilean	Romania	MF	13.07.1984	2005	3	0
Bogdan Cistean	Romania	DF	29.12.1986	2007	8	0
Marius Ciugarin	Romania	DF	20.11.1949	1974–1975	26	0
Raul Ciupe	Romania	DF	24.11.1983	2012	14	0
Octavian Cocan	Romania	DF	17.01.1970	1999–2005		
Mihai Colnic	Romania	FW	17.01.1970	2004–2005	6	0
Dănuţ Coman	Romania	GK	28.03.1979	2008–2010	33	0
Ion Coman	Romania	FW	13.07.1981	2001–2005	10	1
Marius Constantin	Romania	DF	25.10.1984	2002–2004	32	1
Nicolae Constantin	Romania	DF	03.12.1973	2007–2010	54	2
Marian Constantinescu	Romania	MF	08.08.1981	1999–2000; 2007–2008	1; 13	0; 0
Florin Constantinovici	Romania	DF	12.02.1968	2000	13	1
Emanuel Creţulescu	Romania	DF	17.06.1992	2010–present	2	0
Tudorel Cristea	Romania	DF	22.04.1964	1984–1985	37	3
Marian Cristescu	Romania	MF	17.03.1985	2005–2011	154	15
Horia Crişan	Romania	DF	27.06.1991	2011	0	0
Levente Csik	Romania	MF	29.04.1974	1994–1995; 1996–1997		
Robert Dani	Romania	MF	03.05.1974	2001–2005		
Zoltan David	Romania	FW	05.08.1932	1956–1962; 1964–1965		
Cătălin Dedu	Romania	FW	16.05.1987	2005–2012	103	16
Silvian Dobre	Romania	MF	04.12.1967	1994	12	1
Darius Drăgan	Romania	DF	12.02.1992	2010–present	0	0
Cosmin Drăgulin	Romania	MF	04.03.1974	2005	13	2
Emil Dumitriu	Romania	FW	05.11.1942	1969–1971	27	5
Ion Dumitru	Romania	DF	10.11.1983	2006–2011	33	1
Laurenţiu Dumitru	Romania	DF	24.05.1983	2010–2011	1	0
Rareş Enceanu	Romania	MF	05.08.1994	2012–2015	25	2
Nicolae Florescu	Romania	FW	14.11.1949	1967–1972	107	35
Ionuţ Fluierică	Romania	DF	26.12.1985	2007	2	0
Ionel Fulga	Romania	MF	17.02.1971	1996	19	1
Ionel Ganea	Romania	FW	10.08.1973	1994–1996	50	4
Alexandru Gergely	Romania	MF	16.09.1951	1969–1975	142	34
Gábor Gerstenmájer	Romania	MF	13.09.1967	1990–1991		
Sorin Gheju	Romania	FW	12.06.1977	2007–2008	7	0
Viorel Gheorghe	Romania	FW	27.07.1981	2006–2007	23	10
Aurel Ghindaru	Romania	DF	04.12.1971	2000–2002		
Vasile Ghindaru	Romania	MF	09.05.1978	1996–2002; 2004	73; 13	3; 4
Tiberiu Ghioane	Romania	MF	18.06.1981	1999–2000	1	0
Miroslav Giuchici	Romania	FW	07.02.1980	2004	9	1
Nicolae Grigore	Romania	MF	19.07.1983	2004; 2009–2010	11; 29	0; 2
Cosmin Goia	Romania	DF	16.02.1982	2006	5	0
Csaba Györffy	Romania	FW	09.07.1943	1966–1977	294	47
Attila Hadnagy	Romania	FW	08.09.1980	2007–2012	137	37
Carol Haidu	Romania	GK	03.06.1942	1961–1964	40	0
Ion Haidu	Romania	FW	08.09.1980	1963–1968	11	2
Emanoil Hașoti	Romania	FW	14.09.1932	1955–1966	204	34
Cristian Hăisan	Romania	GK	03.03.1981	2011	4	0
Florin Hidişan	Romania	MF	24.06.1982	2006	10	1
Lavi Hrib	Romania	FW	23.02.1973	1995–1997; 2005	49; 2	10; 0
Lucian Ignea	Romania	MF	02.11.1979	2006	6	0
Sabin Ilie	Romania	FW	11.05.1975	1994–1995	19	5
Robert Ilyes	Romania	MF	04.02.1974	2007–2011	138	39
Cristian Ionescu	Romania	DF	01.03.1978	2007–2014	173	6
Vasile Iordache	Romania	GK	09.10.1950	1984–1986	12	1
Nicolae Iorga	Romania	FW	30.05.1972	2000; 2001–2003	8; 50	3; 10
Daniel Isăilă	Romania	DF	29.06.1972	1997–2000; 2001–2006	89; 103	3; 5
Marian Ivan	Romania	FW	01.06.1969	1991–1994; 1996–1997; 1998–2001	91; 15; 78	37; 2; 35
Mihai Ivăncescu	Romania	DF	22.03.1942	1961–1962; 1964–1973	12; 227	2; 11
Iuliu Jenei	Romania	DF	23.12.1939	1962–1974	326	2
Gabriel Kajcsa	Romania	GK	07.07.1974	1996–2000; 2007–2011	42; 16	0; 1
Ioan Kramer	Romania	FW	11.03.1962	1981–1986	131	45
Marius Lăcătuş	Romania	FW	05.04.1964	1981–1983	45	5
Răzvan Lucescu	Romania	GK	17.02.1969	1999–2000	13	0
Casian Maghici	Romania	DF	05.05.1985	2005–2007	41	3
Marian Manole	Romania	FW	02.07.1977	2004–2006	15	0
Alexandru Marc	Romania	GK	16.01.1983	2002–2005; 2010–present	15; 14	0; 0
Alexandru Marky	Romania	GK	05.08.1919	1951–1952		
Alexandru Marianciuc	Romania	MF	01.05.1986	2005–2006	4	1
Ion Mateescu	Romania	DF	25.11.1952	1972–1975	58	11
Alexandru Mateiu	Romania	MF	10.12.1989	2007–present	70	6
Marius Măldărăşanu	Romania	MF	19.04.1975	2008–2010	52	4
Marian Măuţă	Romania	MF	01.02.1976	1998–2001		
Ovidiu Mendizov	Romania	DF	09.08.1986	2005	1	1
Alexandru Meszaros	Romania	FW	26.05.1933	1959–1964	97	25
Casian Miclăuş	Romania	DF	14.08.1977	2003–2005	54	0
Nicolae Mihai	Romania	FW	1926			
Mihai Mincă	Romania	GK	08.10.1984	2009–2010	29	0
Andrei Mitrofan	Romania	MF	31.03.1982	2005	3	0
Dumitru Mitu	Romania	FW	13.02.1975	1995	11	0
Eugen Moldovan	Romania	DF	05.11.1961	1984–1992	204	5
Flavius Moldovan	Romania	DF	27.07.1976	1999–2002; 2005–2006	42; 11	3; 1
Costel Mozacu	Romania	MF	30.09.1976	2003–2004	13	0
Cătălin Munteanu	Romania	MF	26.01.1979	2008–2010	67	4
Cristian Munteanu	Romania	DF	17.10.1980	2011–2013	59	3
Dorel Mutică	Romania	DF	14.03.1973	1997	14	0
Eugen Nae	Romania	GK	23.11.1974	2007–2009	29	0
Iuliu Năftănăilă	Romania	MF	25.08.1942	1961–1967	150	37
Ioan Nagy	Romania	MF	08.11.1954	1972–1990	403	9
Roland Nagy	Romania	MF	12.06.1971	1992–1994	65	8
Cosmin Năstăsie	Romania	FW	22.06.1983	2010–2011	13	0
Dorin Necula	Romania	FW	23.05.1943	1961–1972	206	49
Bogdan Nicolae	Romania	DF	26.04.1976	2002–2005; 2007–2010	74; 58	11; 4
Ion Niță	Romania	MF	21.02.1948	1975–1977	14	1
Vasile Olariu	Romania	MF	06.07.1987	2012–present	3	0
Marin Olteanu	Romania	MF	17.04.1950			
Marius Onofraş	Romania	FW	17.08.1980	2000–2004	85	6
Marius Onofrei	Romania	MF	02.02.1984	2006	5	0
Cristian Oros	Romania	DF	15.10.1984	2006–2011	84	3
Titus Ozon	Romania	FW	13.05.1927	1951	17	8
Costel Pană	Romania	MF	15.07.1967	2000		
Ionuţ Paşca	Romania	DF	14.09.1981	2005–2006	17	0
Cornel Pavlovici	Romania	FW	02.04.1943	1972	4	0
Dan Păltinişanu	Romania	DF	23.03.1951	1970–1972	1	0
Florin Pârvu	Romania	MF	02.04.1975	2004	14	0
Ionel Pârvu	Romania	MF	23.06.1970	1988–1992; 2005–2006	110; 2	20; 0
Bogdan Pereş	Romania	FW	04.07.1983	2005–2006	7	0
Ovidiu Petelean	Romania	DF	02.07.1978			
Tinel Petre	Romania	DF	14.03.1974	1999–2001	16	2
Daniel Petroiesc	Romania	DF	13.08.1975	2005	5	0
Silviu Pintea	Romania	MF	09.04.1985	2004–2005	14	0
Alexandru Piţurcă	Romania	FW	28.10.1983	2009–2010	5	0
Horia Popa	Romania	MF	17.09.1993	2012–present	0	0
Iulian Popa	Romania	FW	13.11.1975	2005	5	0
Marian Popa	Romania	FW	03.03.1967	1995–1996	17	5
Vlad Potecu	Romania	DF	06.06.1993	2010–present	0	0
Andrei Poverlovici	Romania	DF	17.10.1985	2003–2008	25	0
Ciprian Prodan	Romania	FW	28.04.1979	2005–2006	27	14
Florin Prunea	Romania	GK	08.08.1968	2003–2004	14	0
Dorel Purdea	Romania	DF	17.07.1963	1990–1997		
Gabriel Răduță	Romania	FW	15.09.1967	1994; 1996	23	0
Ciprian Răduţoiu	Romania	MF	19.02.1987	2005	17	0
Mihai Roman	Romania	MF	16.10.1984	2007–2010	88	10
Adrian Rusu	Romania	DF	28.07.1984	2010–2011	26	2
Marian Savu	Romania	FW	11.10.1972	1994	12	2
Claudiu Sărmăşan	Romania	MF	06.10.1977	2001–2005		
Horaţiu Sătmar	Romania	MF	21.04.1981	2004–2005	15	0
Sabrin Sburlea	Romania	FW	12.05.1989	2006–2010	113	27
Tibor Selymes	Romania	DF	14.05.1970	1987–1990	64	3
Nicolae Selymes	Romania	FW	11.03.1940	1961–1968	99	13
Adrian Senin	Romania	MF	27.08.1979	2007–2009	48	7
Vasile Seredai	Romania	FW	22.12.1933	1960–1965	106	36
Mirel Soare	Romania	DF	27.07.1986	2007–2008	0	0
Cristian Soporan	Romania	FW	13.11.1975	2005	0	0
Mircea Stan	Romania	DF	03.08.1977	2002–2003	37	4
Stelian Stancu	Romania	DF	22.09.1981	2010	8	0
Dumitru Stângaciu	Romania	GK	09.08.1964	1982–1984	5	0
Florin Stângă	Romania	MF	22.06.1978	1997–1998; 2002–2004; 2011–2012	3; 26; 14	1; 2; 0
Bogdan Stelea	Romania	GK	05.12.1967	2008–2009	23	0
Mihai Stere	Romania	MF	30.12.1975	2000–2004	106	20
Alin Stoica	Romania	MF	10.12.1979	2009	0	0
Bogdan Străuț	Romania	DF	28.04.1986	2012–present	2	0
Leonard Strizu	Romania	FW	28.08.1967	1994–1997; 1998	72	37
Romeo Surdu	Romania	MF	12.01.1984	2001–2005; 2008–2009	66; 21	18; 8
Marcel Şandor	Romania	MF	10.02.1976	2001–2008		
Marian Şandru	Romania	DF	01.08.1981	2005–2006	7	0
Gheorghe Șerbănoiu	Romania	DF	15.10.1950	1968–1975	93	11
Costică Ştefănescu	Romania	DF	26.03.1951	1986–1989		
Gabriel Tamaş	Romania	DF	09.11.1983	1998–1999	1	0
Vasile Tatarciuc	Romania	DF	01.03.1980	2005–2007	61	5
Alin Tene	Romania	MF	13.06.1989	2010–2011	0	0
Alexandru Terheș	Romania	FW	25.09.1960	1987–1988	43	12
Cristian Turcu	Romania	FW	25.12.1976	2006	15	4
Cornel Ţălnar	Romania	MF	09.06.1957	1985–1986	18	0
Cristian Vasc	Romania	MF	08.01.1969	1994-1996; 1998–2003		
Emerich Vascko	Romania	FW	20.03.1972			
Ionuţ Vasiliu	Romania	FW	20.06.1984	2005–2007	33	4
Nistor Văidean	Romania	FW	01.10.1961	1982–1985	69	20
Ionuţ Voicu	Romania	DF	02.08.1984	2006–2011	94	2
Adrian Voiculeţ	Romania	FW	10.06.1985	2011–2012	4	0
Dorel Zaharia	Romania	FW	21.02.1978	2008–2010	46	8
Dan Zdrâncă	Romania	GK	08.07.1981	2006	16	0
Andrei Şanta	Romania	GK	06.03.?	1985-1996	97	0

=== Europe ===
Name	Nationality	Pos	Born	Period	Apps	Goals
Paulo Adriano	Portugal	MF	03.03.1977	2007–2009	60	2
Adnan Aganović	Croatia	MF	03.10.1987	2013–present	9	1
Ilir Bozhiqi	Albania	GK	22.05.1965	1991–1995		
Agim Canaj	Albania	DF	14.07.1962	1991–1994		
Frank Wiafe Danquah	Netherlands	SW	14.10.1989	2013	8	1
Davide Dias	Portugal	MF	12.04.1983	2012; 2013–	16; 26	2; 0
Nuno Diogo	Portugal	DF	13.06.1981	2009–2010	24	2
Rui Duarte	Portugal	DF	11.10.1980	2008–2010	47	0
Mário Felgueiras	Portugal	GK	12.12.1986	2011–2012	34	0
Diogo Fonseca	Portugal	FW	11.12.1984	2013–2014	10	1
Hélder Godinho	Portugal	GK	08.09.1977	2011–2012	0	0
Baže Ilijoski	Macedonia	FW	09.07.1984	2012	12	6
Arman Karamyan	Armenia	FW	14.11.1979	2005–2006	20	11
Ahmet Karayildiz	Turkey	FW	24.02.1977	2005	5	0
Boris Keca	Bosnia-Herzegovina	DF	05.04.1978	2003–2005	14	0
Sérgio Leite	Portugal	GK	16.08.1979	2007	15	0
Ricardo Machado	Portugal	DF	13.09.1988	2011–present	61	6
Bruno Madeira	Portugal	MF	17.09.1984	2011–present	53	2
Peter Majerník	Slovakia	DF	31.12.1978	2010–2012	42	3
Darko Marić	Serbia	FW	02.09.1975	2005	3	0
Dejan Martinović	Croatia	MF	19.07.1983	2010–2011	20	0
Altin Masati	Albania	DF		1993–1995		
Nasser Menassel	France	MF	06.01.1983	2012	6	0
Arben Minga	Albania	DF	16.03.1959	1993–1995	17	1
Pedro Moutinho	Portugal	FW	09.09.1979	2011–2012	30	7
Dejan Pešić	Serbia	MF	16.12.1976	2005	5	0
Diogo Santos	Portugal	MF	13.11.1984	2013–present	5	0
Ayhan Güçlü	Turkey	FW	28.10.1990	2013	2	0
Márcio Santos	Portugal	GK	05.05.1979	2004–2005	0	0
Dušan Savić	Macedonia	MF	01.10.1985	2010	10	2
Serginho	Portugal	DF	12.10.1985	2013–present	10	0
Diogo Silva	Portugal	DF	26.04.1983	2012	2	0
Hugo Sousa	Portugal	DF	04.06.1992	2011	2	0
Dušan Šimić	Serbia	MF	22.07.1980	2007	12	1
Pedro Taborda	Portugal	GK	22.06.1978	2012	16	0
Filipe Teixeira	Portugal	MF	02.10.1980	2011	13	1
Javier Velayos	Spain	DF	06.04.1987	2011–2013	52	0
Dušan Vidojević	Serbia	MF	06.04.1979	2006	9	1
Nuno Viveiros	Portugal	MF	22.06.1983	2010–2013	78	3

=== South America ===
Name	Nationality	Pos	Born	Period	Apps	Goals
Mauro Alonso	Brazil	MF	12.08.1988	2012	2	0
Ángel Gastón Díaz	Argentina	MF	26.03.1981	2007	13	2
David Distéfano	Argentina	MF	10.07.1987	2011–2012	35	4
Jonathan Domínguez	Argentina	FW	19.10.1987	2011	2	0
Ezequias	Brazil	DF	28.01.1981	2008–2010	57	2
Fabinho	Brazil	MF	26.02.1982	2008	17	1
Diego Gaúcho	Brazil	DF	15.11.1981	2011	9	0
Josías	Brazil	FW	07.11.1981	2011	9	3
Renato Kanu	Brazil	FW	27.10.1985	2011	9	0
Julio Landauri	Peru	MF	17.04.1986	2010	6	0
Sebastián Páez	Chile	MF	13.08.1986	2011	6	0
Itamar Santos	Brazil	MF	01.04.1978	2002–2003	7	0
Juan Toloza	Chile	MF	04.05.1985	2011	25	0
Willams	Brazil	MF	05.08.1983	2010–2011	24	0

=== Africa ===
Name	Nationality	Pos	Born	Period	Apps	Goals
Lamine Diarrassouba	Côte d'Ivoire	FW	01.01.1986	2010	6	0
Ibrahim Dossey	Ghana	GK	24.11.1972	2000–2005	90	0
Mustafa Jarra	Ghana	DF		2002–2003	5	0
Seydou Mariko	Côte d'Ivoire	DF	26.04.1977	2003–2004	0	0
Néné	Cape Verde	MF	24.08.1979	2009–2010	9	0
Mohammed Odoi	Ghana			2001–2002		
Chigozie Udoji	Nigeria	MF	16.07.1986	2012	6	0
