= 2010–11 FC Brașov season =

FC Brașov
2010–11 season
- Chairman: Iosif Kovacs
- Manager: Daniel Isăilă (Day 1 to Day 18); António Conceição (Rest of the season)
- Stadium: Silviu Ploeşteanu
- Liga I: 12th
- Cupa României: Semifinals
- Top goalscorer: League: Robert Ilyes (9); All: Robert Ilyes (10)
- Highest home attendance: 8,000 (vs Steaua București, August 7, 2010); 8,000 (vs Steaua București, May 11, 2011)
- Lowest home attendance: 1,000 (vs Gaz Metan Mediaş, September 27, 2010); 1,000 (vs Timişoara, October 31, 2010); 1,000 (vs Pandurii Târgu Jiu, May 15, 2011)
- Average home league attendance: 3,275
Home colours	Away colours

The 2010–11 season was FC Brașov's third season in Liga I since their return to top-flight football in 2008.

== Overview ==
On June 16 the players returned from holiday to training. Only 9 from the 27 players squad in the previous season were present and few others from the reserve/junior teams, after many of the key players had left the club, having finished their contracts with Braşov. Few days later 2 other players joined the training, Cristian Ionescu and Mihai Roman, the first extending his contract for another year. Later on Mincă also returned to training. Previous season' main coach Viorel Moldovan finished his contract with Braşov, while Robert Ilyes was named player/assistant manager, alongside Daniel Isăilă, the other assistant manager. The executive director Dinu Gheorghe left Braşov for Rapid București.

The club reached this season for the second consecutive time into the semifinals of the Romanian Cup. They missed by little the chance to play the final on their home ground, being eliminated on away goals by Steaua București after an 86-minute equaliser by Nicolae Dică, in the second leg match.

== Manager ==
Although it was almost certain that the Bosnian Blaž Slišković would be the new manager, on June 27 it was announced that the Italian Giuseppe Materazzi would take onto the team in the next season, with the goal of qualifying for the Europa League. He was sacked only three days later without any official reason. In the evening of July 8 the club announced that Rapid assistant manager Marian Rada would take charge at Braşov. That started unrest among the fans, publicly stated on the Internet, causing him to give up on taking the job. Next day the club finally announced that players' and fans' favorite Daniel Isăilă would be the main coach. Isăilă had been the assistant manager of Braşov in the last two seasons, under Răzvan Lucescu and Viorel Moldovan, and a former Braşov player from the UEFA Cup period of 2001. He has been at the club all years since then, as a player or assistant manager, except for one half of a season in 2007 when he managed local neighbor club FC Săcele, spectacularly succeeding to avoid relegation and even achieving a 3–2 victory against Braşov in a season ending match.

On December 18, unexpectedly, António Conceição was presented as the new manager of the team, while Daniel Isăilă remained however in the technical staff as the assistant manager. The Portuguese manager had been in the previous season the manager of CFR Cluj for an eight-month period, achieving to win the Liga I and the Romanian Cup. The deal was signed for the remaining half of the season, with an extension clause included. Iosif Kovacs was also returning to the club after six years to take the chairman job.

== Players ==
The squad was filled with several players from the reserves team or from the under 21 team who had been loaned to regional lower division clubs the previous season. That included: Alexandru Târziu (previous season at Unirea Tărlungeni), Alexandru David (previous season at Snagov), Ciprian Pricop (previous season Arieşul Turda) and the junior players Florin Iacob, Vlad Potecu, Darius Drăgan, Manuel Creţulescu, Bogdan Liţă.

On June 27 it has been announced that other two key players of the previous season, Mihai Roman and Sabrin Sburlea had been transferred to Rapid București for an unofficial fee of €800,000 or €1.5 million by other sources.

On 2 July two foreign players signed with Braşov: the Brazilian aged 26, José Willams da Silva Mendonça (referred to as Willams), who had played the previous season for Portuguese Second League side Trofense, and the Slovak aged 31, Peter Majerník, last time at Slovak Superliga team MFK Ružomberok. Both of them came as free agents. A total of eight players were registered at the PFL ahead of the first game of the season. The only player to join the squad few days before the first league game was Cosmin Năstăsie, who came on a one-year loan from Argeş Piteşti.

Dănuţ Coman, once the goalkeeper of the Romania national football team, and the club mutually agreed to end their contract on August 7, so that he was released on free transfer. Only eleven days later he returned at Rapid București, his previous team before playing for Braşov. At this time he had been injured since early April and was lacking training, so that he was not the first choice for goalkeeper at Rapid after being signed. Still it has been stated that his salary was far too high for the club's budget. He was the sixteenth player to leave the club this season.

Nuno Viveiros was signed by Braşov on August 25, after he ended his contract with Politehnica Iaşi by mutual agreement. His former club was relegated from Liga I the last season, but was neither able to meet conditions for playing in Liga II in the 2010–11 season.

Transfers continued at Braşov during the season break in the start of September, consisting in two other signings: Daniel Bălaşa (previously at Argeş Piteşti), and the Ivorian striker Lamine Diarrassouba (previously at Politehnica Iaşi).

The middle of the season saw somehow important changes in the squad, the new manager bringing four fresh new South American players: Diego Gaúcho, David Distéfano, Josías Paulo Cardoso and Juan Toloza. At the same time, the first option for the goalkeeper position until the winter break, Mihai Mincă was leaving to CFR Cluj, and three other players, Daniel Bălaşa, Laurenţiu Dumitru and Valentin Bădoi were terminating their contracts. Also during January, strikers Lamine Diarrassouba and Valentin Badea ended their contracts with the club by mutual agreement. With 9 foreign players, this season's squad was most probably the one with the most in club's history.

The last transfer of the mid-season completed under the new coach was French-born Portuguese Filipe Teixeira, landed on loan until the end of the season from Ukrainian side Metalurh Donetsk on February 21, 2011. Also junior player Darius Drăgan was being loaned out to fellow local club SCM Braşov.

It was announced near the end of the season, on May 14, that Braşov had reached an agreement with Chilean club Unión San Felipe for the transfer of Argentine midfielder Miguel Ángel González, known as El Mágico. Also the loans of the other two players from the Chilean club, Juan Toloza and David Distéfano, were extended for one more season. Wearing the number 10 in San Felipe's squad, the Argentine is supposed to be the replacement of 37 years old captain player Robert Ilyes, after rumors regarding his eventual departure to the Liga I club Târgu Mureş were finally confirmed on May 15.

Cristian Oroş settled a transfer to Rapid București for the next season, while coach António Conceição stated he would continue at Braşov only if the club aimed at being one of the strongest in the country. The objective set for the next season would be a top five finish.

== Squad ==
As of February 25, 2011

Note: Flags indicate national team as defined under FIFA eligibility rules; some limited exceptions apply. Players may hold more than one non-FIFA nationality.

No.	Pos.	Nation	Player
1	GK	ROU	Alexandru Marc
4	DF	BRA	Diego Gaúcho
5	MF	ROU	Florin Stângă
6	DF	SVK	Peter Majerník
7	MF	ROU	Alexandru Chipciu
8	MF	ROU	Alexandru Mateiu
9	FW	ROU	Attila Hadnagy
10	MF	ROU	Robert Ilyes (captain)
11	MF	CRO	Dejan Martinović
12	DF	ROU	Cristian Ionescu
13	GK	ROU	Gabriel Kajcsa
14	MF	ARG	David Distéfano
15	DF	ROU	Cristian Oroş

No.	Pos.	Nation	Player
16	MF	POR	Nuno Viveiros
17	FW	ROU	Cătălin Dedu
18	MF	ROU	Marian Cristescu
20	DF	ROU	Ionuţ Voicu
21	DF	ROU	Adrian Rusu
23	FW	BRA	Josías
25	MF	CHI	Juan Toloza
26	MF	BRA	Willams
27	FW	ROU	Cosmin Năstăsie
28	DF	ROU	Emanuel Creţulescu
30	GK	ROU	Florin Iacob
49	GK	ROU	Cristian Hăisan
80	MF	POR	Filipe Teixeira

== Transfers ==
=== Pre-season ===
In:

Out:

No.	Pos.	Nation	Player
1	GK	ROU	Alexandru Marc (free agent)
4	DF	ROU	Daniel Bălaşa (from Argeş Piteşti)
6	DF	SVK	Peter Majerník (free agent)
11	MF	CRO	Dejan Martinović (free agent)
14	MF	ROU	Valentin Bădoi (free agent)
16	MF	POR	Nuno Viveiros (free agent)
21	DF	ROU	Adrian Rusu (one year loan from Pandurii Târgu Jiu)
22	FW	CIV	Lamine Diarrassouba (free agent)
23	FW	ROU	Valentin Badea (free agent)
26	MF	BRA	Williams (free agent)
27	MF	ROU	Cosmin Năstăsie (one year loan from Argeş Piteşti)
55	DF	ROU	Laurenţiu Dumitru (free agent)

No.	Pos.	Nation	Player
1	GK	ROU	Dănuţ Coman (free transfer)
2	DF	POR	Rui Duarte (to Rapid București)
3	DF	BRA	Ezequias (to Rapid București)
4	DF	ROU	Octavian Abrudan (to Steaua București)
6	MF	CPV	Néné (end of contract)
7	MF	ROU	Cătălin Munteanu (to Dinamo București)
8	MF	ROU	Nicolae Grigore (to Rapid București)
11	FW	ROU	Dorel Zaharia (end of contract)
14	MF	ROU	Mihai Roman (to Rapid București)
19	FW	MKD	Dušan Savić (end of contract)
21	FW	ROU	Sabrin Sburlea (to Rapid București)
23	DF	ROU	Nicolae Constantin (end of contract)
24	MF	PER	Julio Landauri (free transfer)
25	DF	ROU	Stelian Stancu (end of contract)
27	MF	ROU	Marius Măldărăşanu (end of contract)
55	DF	POR	Nuno Diogo (to CFR Cluj)

=== Mid-season ===
In:

Out:

No.	Pos.	Nation	Player
4	DF	BRA	Diego Gaúcho (loan from Leiria)
5	MF	ROU	Florin Stângă (from Târgu Mureş)
14	MF	ARG	David Distéfano (loan from Unión San Felipe)
23	FW	BRA	Josías (loan from Sol de América)
25	MF	CHI	Juan Toloza (loan from Unión San Felipe)
49	GK	ROU	Cristian Hăisan (from Vaslui)
80	MF	POR	Filipe Teixeira (loan from Metalurh Donetsk)

No.	Pos.	Nation	Player
4	DF	ROU	Daniel Bălaşa (free transfer)
14	MF	ROU	Valentin Bădoi (free transfer)
22	FW	CIV	Lamine Diarrassouba (free transfer)
23	FW	ROU	Valentin Badea (free transfer)
32	GK	ROU	Mihai Mincă (to CFR Cluj)
55	DF	ROU	Laurenţiu Dumitru (free transfer)

== Friendlies ==
=== Pre-season ===
Match Type	Date / Time	H / A	Opponents	Result	Attendance
Friendly	July 7 16:00	N	Ceahlăul Piatra Neamţ	2 – 0	
Friendly	July 11 11:00	N	Forex Braşov	5 – 1	
Friendly	July 14 11:00	H	Ceahlăul Piatra Neamţ	1 – 0	150
Friendly	July 16 11:00	N	(Israel) Bnei Sakhnin	4 – 1	150

H = Home, A = Away, N = Neutral

=== Mid-season ===
Match Type	Date / Time	H / A	Opponents	Result	Attendance
Friendly	January 26 15:00	N	(South Korea) Yonsei University	1–3	
Friendly	January 29 15:30	N	(Austria) Mattersburg	2–0	
Friendly	February 2 15:00	N	(Bosnia and Herzegovina) Čelik Zenica	2–0	
Friendly	February 5 15:00	N	(Montenegro) Zeta Golubovci	0–0	
Friendly	February 8 11:00	N	(South Korea) Gyeongnam	5–2	

H = Home, A = Away, N = Neutral

== Competitions ==
=== Liga I ===
Round	Date / Time	H / A	Opponents	Result	Attendance	Position	Points	Goal Diff
1	July 26 18:00	A	Târgu Mureş	1–0	7,000	5	3	+1
2	August 1 19:00	H	Universitatea Cluj	3–1	1,500	2	6	+3
3	August 7 21:00	H	Steaua București	1–1	8,000	3	7	+3
4	August 14 20:30	A	Vaslui	1–2	5,000	4	7	+2
5	August 23 20:30	H	Unirea Urziceni	1–1	3,000	7	8	+2
6	August 29 18:00	A	Oţelul Galaţi	0–1	4,000	9	8	+1
7	September 12 21:00	H	Dinamo București	2–2	5,000	8	9	+1
8	September 20 18:00	A	Gloria Bistriţa	0–0	3,000	9	10	+1
9	September 27 18:00	H	Gaz Metan Mediaş	0–0	1,000	10	11	+1
10	October 3 18:00	A	CFR Cluj	0–4	5,000	13	11	-3
11	October 18 20:30	H	Universitatea Craiova	0–3	3,000	14	11	-6
12	October 22 16:30	N	Victoria Brăneşti	1–1	1,000	14	12	-6
13	October 31 21:30	H	Timişoara	0–0	1,000	14	13	-6
14	November 6 18:30	A	Astra Ploieşti	0–3	2,500	16	13	-9
15	November 13 19:00	H	Sportul Studenţesc	2–0	1,500	14	16	-7
16	November 19 14:00	N	Pandurii Târgu Jiu	1–2	1,000	16	16	-8
17	November 27 19:30	H	Rapid București	2–0	4,500	13	19	-6
18	December 3 18:45	H	Târgu Mureş	1–1	1,500	12	20	-6
Winter break
19	February 27 14:00	N	Universitatea Cluj	1–1	1,500	10	21	-6
20	March 6 20:00	A	Steaua București	3–0	5,000	10	24	-3
21	March 14 20:30	H	Vaslui	1–1	6,000	11	25	-3
22	March 21 20:30	A	Unirea Urziceni	1–1	300	11	26	-3
23	April 1 18:45	H	Oţelul Galaţi	1–0	7,000	10	29	-2
24	April 6 20:00	A	Dinamo București	1–2	2,000	12	29	-3
25	April 9 19:00	H	Gloria Bistriţa	0–1	2,000	13	29	-4
26	April 13 17:30	A	Gaz Metan Mediaş	0–0	2,500	13	30	-4
27	April 17 19:00	H	CFR Cluj	2–2	3,500	13	31	-4
28	April 24 20:30	A	Universitatea Craiova	2–1	4,000	12	34	-3
29	April 27 17:00	H	Victoria Brăneşti	1–0	2,000	12	37	-2
30	April 30 21:30	A	Timişoara	0–2	3,000	12	37	-4
31	May 4 18:30	H	Astra Ploieşti	0–3	2,000	12	37	-7
32	May 8 18:00	A	Sportul Studenţesc	2–1	100	12	40	-6
33	May 15 16:00	H	Pandurii Târgu Jiu	3–2	1,000	12	43	-5
34	May 21 17:00	A	Rapid București	0–1	6,000	12	43	-6

H = Home, A = Away, N = Neutral

Overall								Home						Away					
Pld	W	D	L	GF	GA	GD	Pts	W	D	L	GF	GA	GD	W	D	L	GF	GA	GD
34	7	17	10	15	16	−1	38	4	8	5	8	7	+1	3	9	5	7	9	−2

Source: Soccerway

=== Cupa României ===
Round	Date / Time	H / A	Opponents	Result	Attendance
Round of 32	September 23 16:00	A	Chimia Brazi	1–0	800
Round of 16	October 26 16:00	H	Universitatea Cluj	2–1	1,500
Quarterfinals	November 10 17:00	H	Timişoara	1–0	2,500
Semifinals, first leg	April 21 20:45	A	Steaua București	0–0	7,000
Semifinals, second leg	May 11 20:45	H	Steaua București	1–1	8,000

H = Home, A = Away, N = Neutral
