= David Distéfano =

Argentine footballer

Personal information
- Full name: David Andrés Distéfano
- Date of birth: 10 July 1987 (age 39)
- Place of birth: Buenos Aires, Argentina
- Height: 1.75 m (5 ft 9 in)
- Position: Attacking midfielder

Team information
- Current team: Blooming

Youth career
- Boca Juniors

Senior career*
Years	Team	Apps	(Gls)
2008–2009	Nueva Chicago	41	(6)
2009–2013	Unión San Felipe	22	(1)
2011–2012	→ Braşov (loan)	35	(4)
2012–2013	→ Astra Giurgiu (loan)	27	(3)
2013–2014	Pandurii Târgu Jiu	19	(1)
2014	Gimnasia	3	(0)
2014–2016	Huracán	12	(2)
2016–	Blooming	0	(0)
- * Club domestic league appearances and goals as of 28 June 2016

David Distéfano (born 10 July 1987) is an Argentine footballer who plays for Blooming as an attacking midfielder.

== Club career ==
=== Unión San Felipe ===
In December 2009, Distéfano joined to recently promoted team and also 2009 Copa Chile recently champion, Unión San Felipe. He made his fully debut on 3 February 2010 against Audax Italiano and scored his first goal on 14 February 2010, in a 1–3 loss against Deportes La Serena.

He had more continuity in the second semester of the year, in where he took part in the 2010 Copa Sudamericana with Unión San Felipe, scoring one goal in the 4–2 victory against LDU Quito, in the Round of 16 of the competition, but his team was eventually eliminated.

=== FC Braşov ===
On 14 January 2011, his move to the Romanian club FC Brașov was confirmed, along with his team-mate Juan Toloza. Both players signed contracts for one season and joined the club's pre-season tournament in Turkey, after completing the medical tests.

He made his Liga I debut on 1 April 2011 in a 1–0 win over Oţelul Galaţi, coming as a substitute for Adrian Rusu. He scored his first goal for FC Braşov against CFR Cluj on 17 April 2011 from penalty spot, and then scored his second in a decisive moment of the season against Universitatea Craiova, on 24 April 2011, signing the winning goal in a 2–1 away victory. Further goals came in the first round of the 2011–12 season against Gaz Metan Mediaş, on 25 July 2011, when he scored the winning goal in the stoppage time of the game, and on 27 April 2012, when he scored against the league leaders Dinamo București in a 2–0 win.

=== Astra Giurgiu ===
On 5 July 2012, the player was loaned to the Romanian club Astra Giurgiu, also competing in the Liga I. At the end of the season, he made a total of 27 appearances, scoring three goals, and his club finished fourth in the league.

=== Pandurii Târgu Jiu ===
On 20 August 2013, he signed with the Romanian club Pandurii Târgu Jiu, along which he participated in the 2013–14 UEFA Europa League, playing against Dnipro Dnipropetrovsk, Paços de Ferreira and Fiorentina.
