= Cosmin Văsîie =

Romanian footballer

Personal information
- Full name: Cosmin Marin Văsîie
- Date of birth: 16 November 1976 (age 49)
- Place of birth: Câmpia Turzii, Romania
- Height: 1.74 m (5 ft 9 in)
- Position: Full back

Youth career
- IS Câmpia Turzii

Senior career*
Years	Team	Apps	(Gls)
1999–2000	IS Câmpia Turzii		
2000–2002	Universitatea Cluj (Note: The statistics for the 2000–01 Divizia C season are unavailable.)	19	(3)
2002–2006	CFR Cluj	79	(6)
2006	→ Unirea Dej (loan)	8	(0)
2006–2007	Ceahlăul Piatra Neamț	25	(0)
2007–2009	UTA Arad	21	(0)
2009–2011	Arieșul Turda	37	(1)
2011–2013	Seso Câmpia Turzii		
Total		189+	(10)
- * Club domestic league appearances and goals as of 26 February 2018

Cosmin Văsîie (born 16 November 1976) is a Romanian former footballer who played as a full back. Văsîie started his career in his hometown at IS Câmpia Turzii, then played for Universitatea Cluj, CFR Cluj, Ceahlăul Piatra Neamț and UTA Arad among others. With CFR Cluj he had the best results, succeeding in a Liga I promotion and a participation in the 2005 UEFA Intertoto Cup, where he played in 5 matches as the railwaymen reached the final.

== Honours ==
Universitatea Cluj

- Divizia C: 2000–01

CFR Cluj

- Liga II: 2003–04
- UEFA Intertoto Cup runner-up: 2005
