= Mircea Rus =

Romanian footballer

Personal information
- Full name: Mircea Vasile Rus
- Date of birth: 9 April 1978 (age 48)
- Place of birth: Câmpia Turzii, Romania
- Height: 1.74 m (5 ft 9 in)
- Position: Right-back

Senior career*
Years	Team	Apps	(Gls)
2001–2002	Universitatea Cluj	26	(2)
2002–2004	CFR Cluj	49	(1)
2004–2006	Politehnica Timișoara	27	(0)
2007–2008	Gloria Bistrița	21	(1)
2008–2009	Unirea Alba Iulia	0	(0)
2009–2013	Seso Câmpia Turzii	?	(?)
Total		123+	(4)
- * Club domestic league appearances and goals as of 21 June 2016

Mircea Vasile Rus (born 9 April 1978) is a Romanian former football player who played as a right-back.
