= Câmpia Turzii =

- Municipality
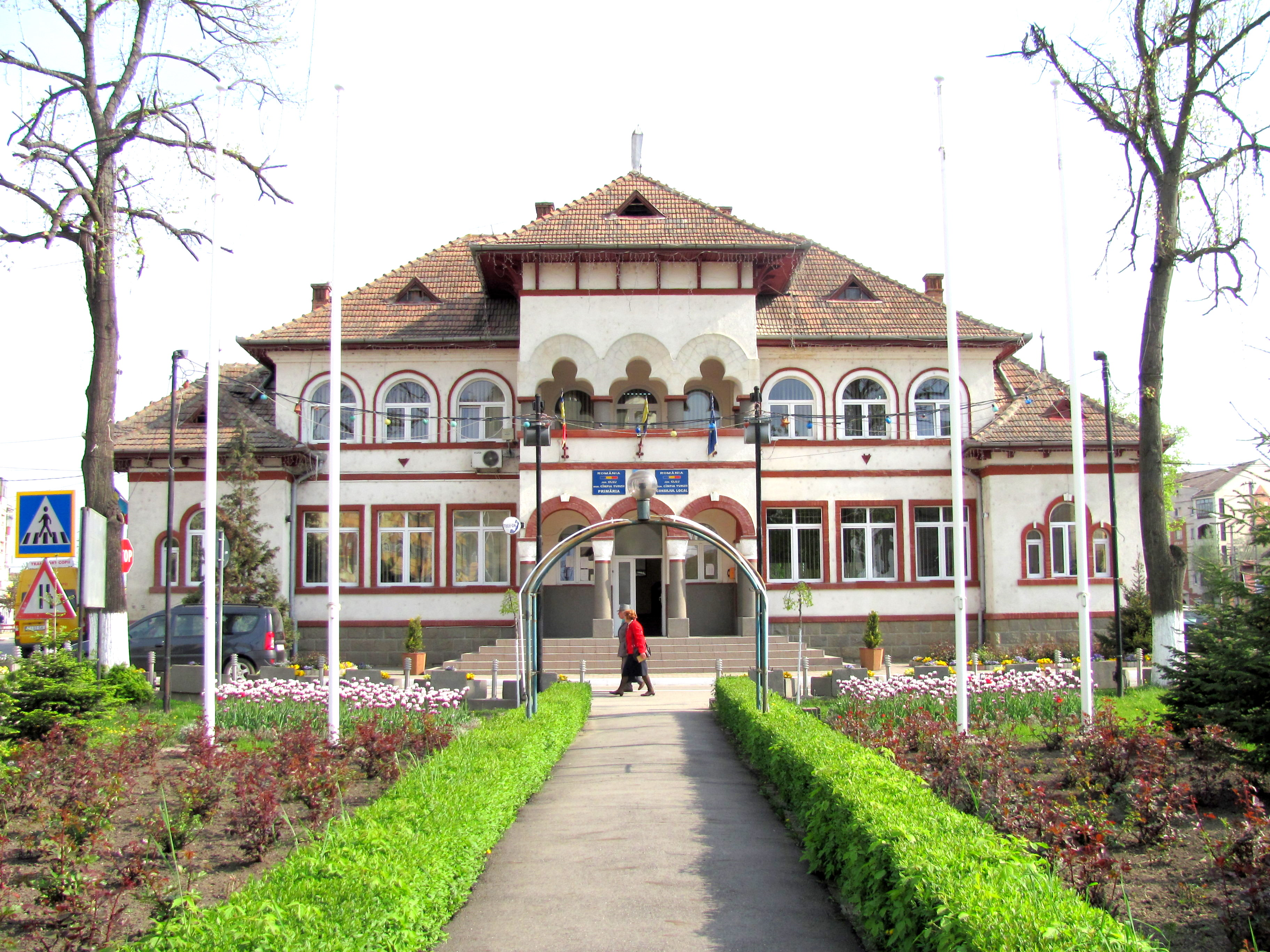
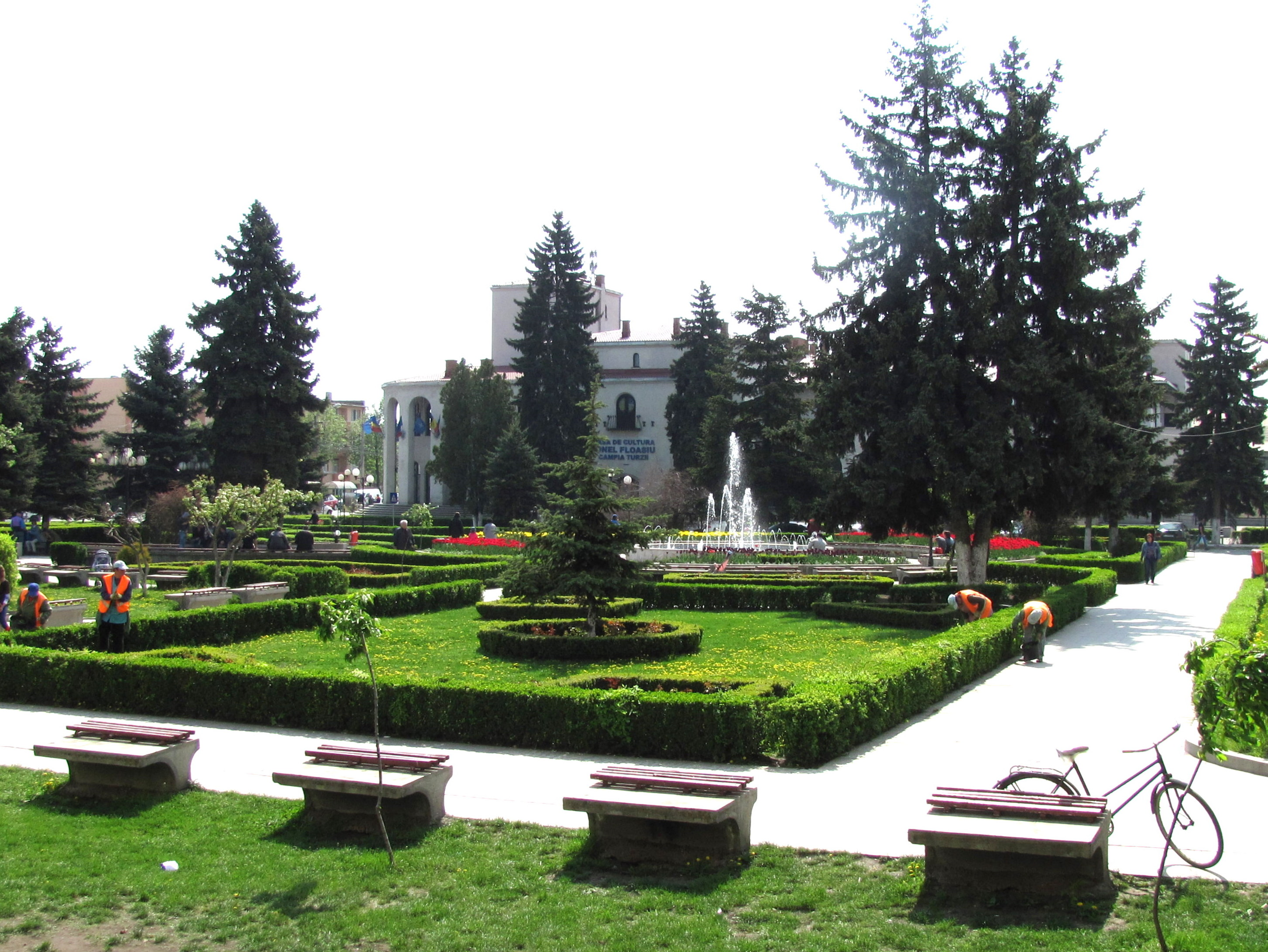
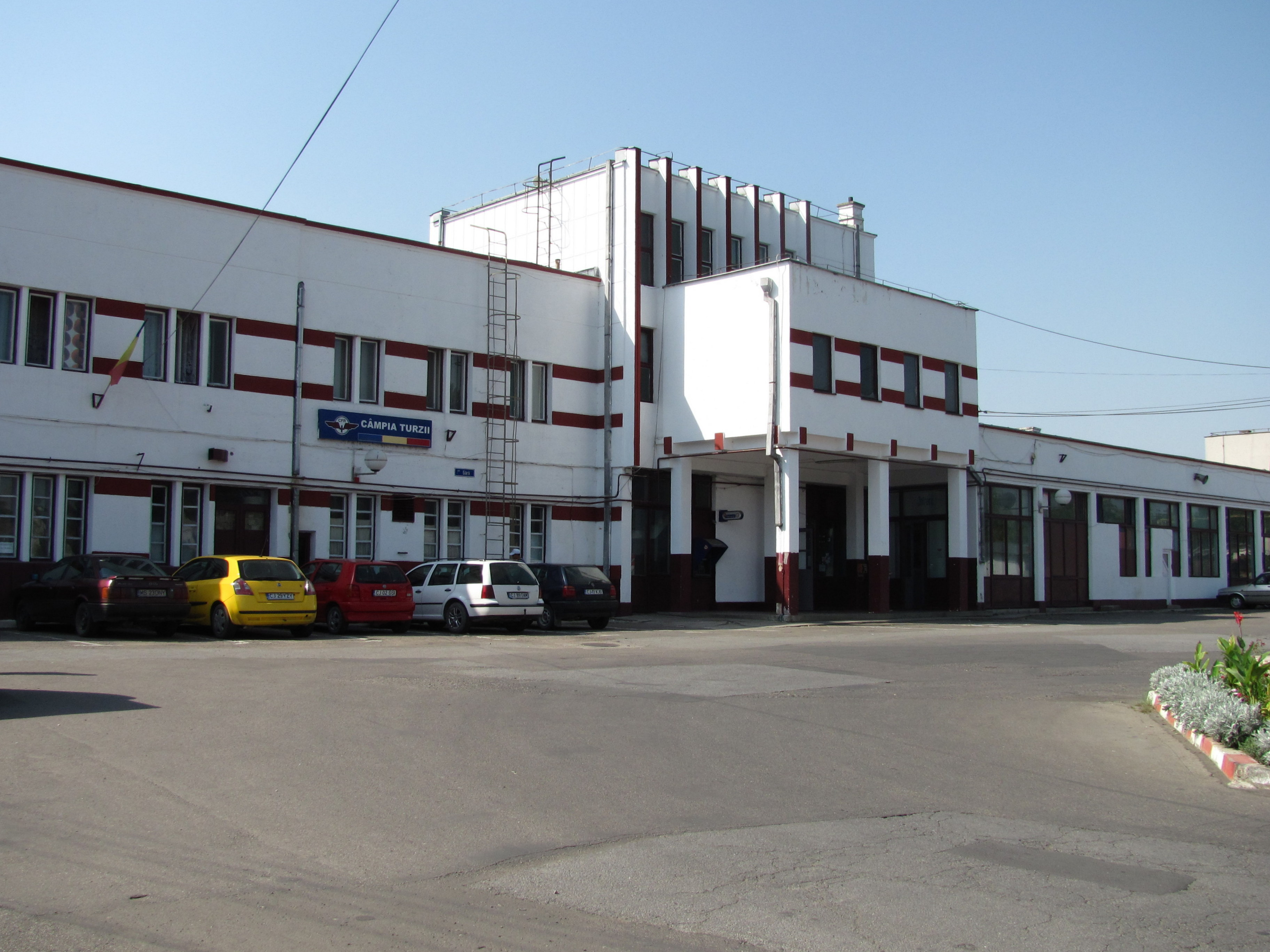
- Câmpia Turzii town hall Câmpia Turzii Central Park Câmpia Turzii railway station Câmpia Turzii town hall

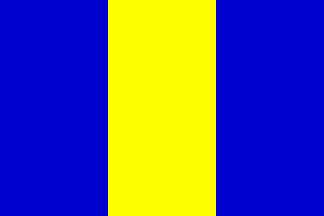
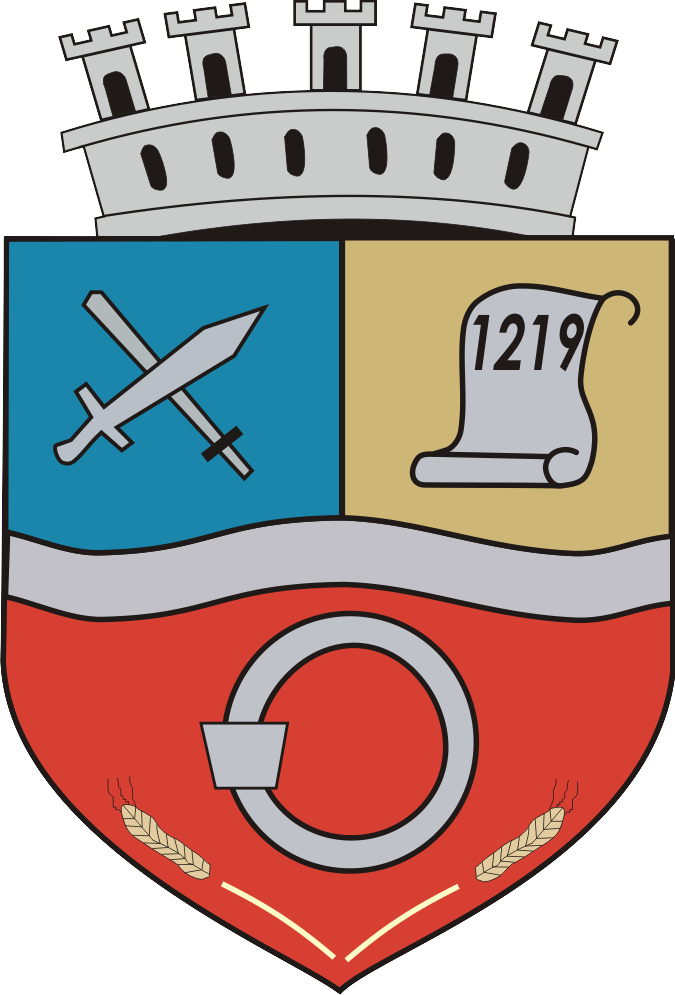
- Flag Coat of arms

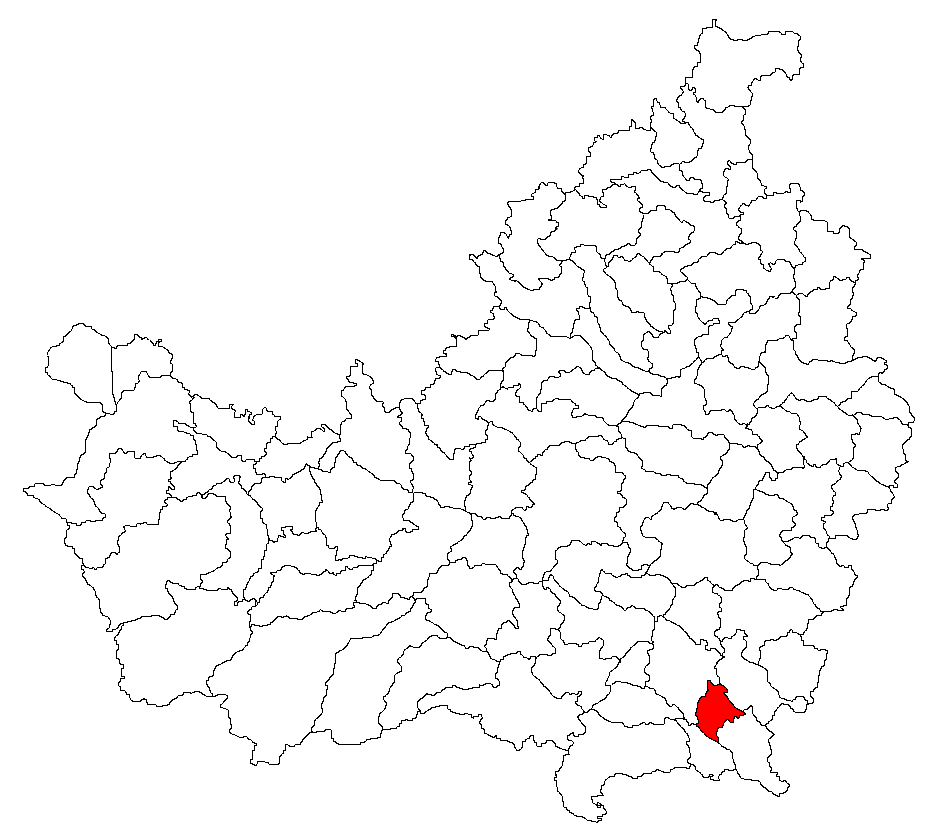
- Location in Cluj County

- Location in Romania
- Coordinates: 46°32′55″N 23°52′48″E
- Country: Romania
- County: Cluj

Government
  - Mayor (2024–2028): Dorin Lojigan (PNL)
- Area: 23.78 km^{2} (9.18 sq mi)
- Elevation: 300 m (980 ft)
- Population (2021-12-01): 20,590
  - Density: 865.9/km^{2} (2,243/sq mi)
- Time zone: UTC+02:00 (EET)
  - Summer (DST): UTC+03:00 (EEST)
- Postal code: 405100
- Area code: +40 x64
- Vehicle reg.: CJ
- Website: campiaturzii.ro

Câmpia Turzii (Romanian pronunciation: [kɨmˌpi.a ˈturzij]; German: Jerischmarkt; Hungarian: Aranyosgyéres) is a municipality in Cluj County, Transylvania, Romania, which was formed in 1925 by the union of two villages, Ghiriș (Aranyosgyéres) and Sâncrai (Szentkirály). It was declared a town in 1950 and a city in 1998.

The city is located in the southeastern part of the county, on the right bank of the Arieș River, at a distance of 6.7 km (4.2 mi) from Turda and 40.6 km (25.2 mi) from the county seat, Cluj-Napoca.

== History ==
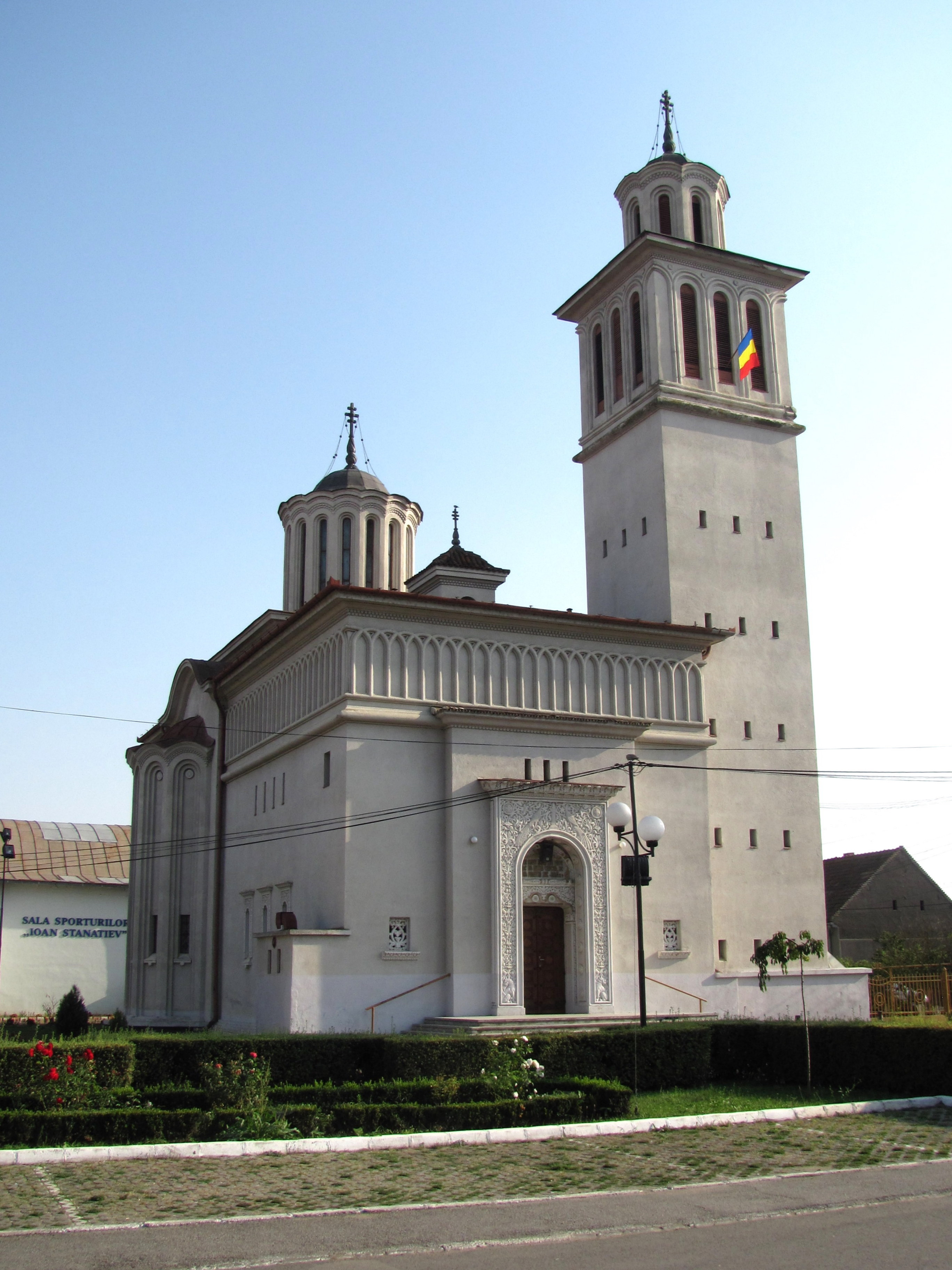
Resurrection of the Lord Orthodox Church

The village of Sâncrai was mentioned in a 1219 document as "villa Sancti Regis" ("village of Holy King"), while Ghiriș was first documented in 1292 as "Terra Gerusteleke" ("Gerusteleke", literally meaning "plot of Gerus" in Hungarian).

Michael the Brave was murdered by agents of Giorgio Basta at the current location of Câmpia Turzii on 9 August 1601.

== Population ==
Ethnic composition of Câmpia Turzii
Year	Romanians	Hungarians	Romani
1850	49%	40%	10%
2002 census	87.03%	8.16%	4.66%
2011 census	80.93%	6.66%	5.06%
2021 census	76.42%	4.72%	3.32%

The population has evolved as follows since 1784:

- 1784: Ghiriș: 565; Sâncrai: 472
- 1850: Ghiriș: 1,168; Sâncrai: 487
- 1910: Ghiriș: 1,815; Sâncrai: 704
- 1930 census: 4,124
- 1948 census: 6,310
- 1956 census: 11,518
- 1977 census: 22,418
- 2002 census: 26,823
- 2011 census: 22,223
- 2021 census: 20,590

== Military activity ==
The city is home to the Romanian Air Force's RoAF 71st Air Base, and during the NATO Summit of 2008, the 323d Air Expeditionary Wing of the United States Air Force. F-15s from RAF Lakenheath in the United Kingdom flew out during the summit to augment air defence forces for the event.

In April 2015, a U.S. Air Force group of A-10 Thunderbolt attack aircraft stationed in Germany arrived at the RoAF 71st Air Base to take part in exercises with the Romanian Air Force.

== Natives ==
- Mihai Adam, footballer
- Andra, singer
- Sebastian Cojocnean, footballer
- Andrei Cordoș, footballer
- Andrei Coroian, footballer
- Cozmin Gușă, physicist, journalist, and politician
- Iuliu Jenei, footballer
- Cosmin Mărginean, footballer
- Teodor Murășanu, writer and teacher
- Mircea Rus, footballer
- Virginia Ruzici, tennis player
- Ioan Sabău, footballer
- Cristian Silvășan, footballer
- Cosmin Văsîie, footballer
