= Nicolae Pescaru =

Romanian footballer (1943–2019)

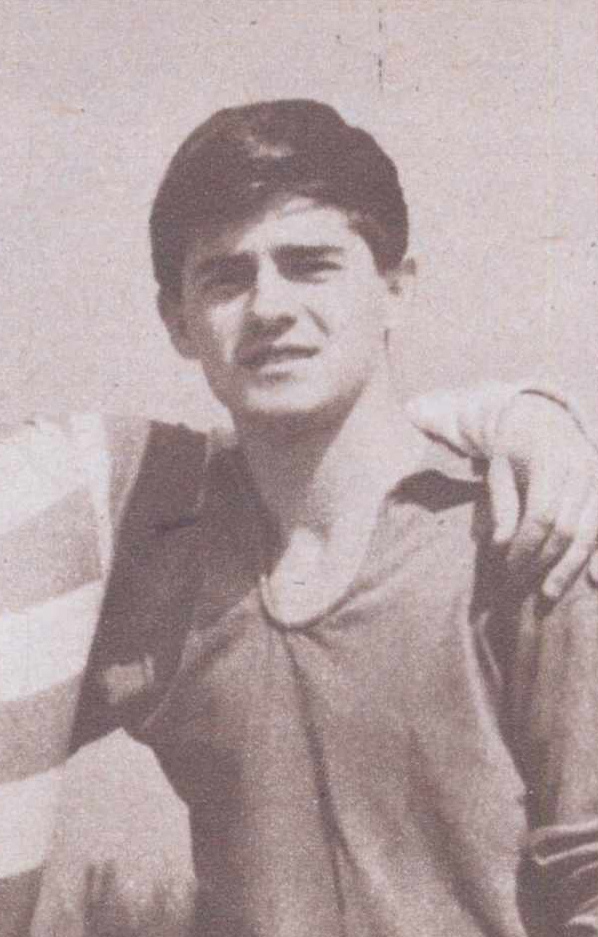

Personal information
- Date of birth: 27 March 1943
- Place of birth: Breaza, Prahova County, Romania
- Date of death: 25 May 2019 (aged 76)
- Place of death: Mihăești, Vâlcea, Romania
- Height: 1.73 m (5 ft 8 in)
- Position: Midfielder

Youth career
- 1959–1960: Someșul Beclean
- 1960–1961: Progresul Făgăraș

Senior career*
Years	Team	Apps	(Gls)
1961–1962	Chimia Făgăraș		
1962–1981	Steagul Roșu Brașov (Note: The statistics for the 1975–76, 1976–77, 1977–78 Divizia B seasons are unavailable.)	392	(77)
1981–1982	Șoimii IPA Sibiu	15	(1)
Total		407	(78)

International career
1970–1973	Romania	3	(0)

Managerial career
- 1981–1982: Steagul Roșu Brașov
- 1993–1994: Steagul Roșu Brașov
- * Club domestic league appearances and goals

Nicolae Pescaru (27 March 1943 – 25 May 2019) was a Romanian football play and manager, who worked mostly for Steagul Roșu Brașov.

== Club career ==
Pescaru, nicknamed "Prințul" (The Prince), was born on 27 March 1943 in Breaza, Prahova County, Romania. He began playing junior-level football in 1959 at Someșul Beclean, and after one year he moved to Progresul Făgăraș. He started to play senior football at Chimia Făgăraș in Divizia B. Subsequently, Pescaru was transferred to Steagul Roșu Brașov where he made his Divizia A debut on 23 September 1962 under coach Silviu Ploeșteanu in a 4–2 home victory against Știința Cluj.

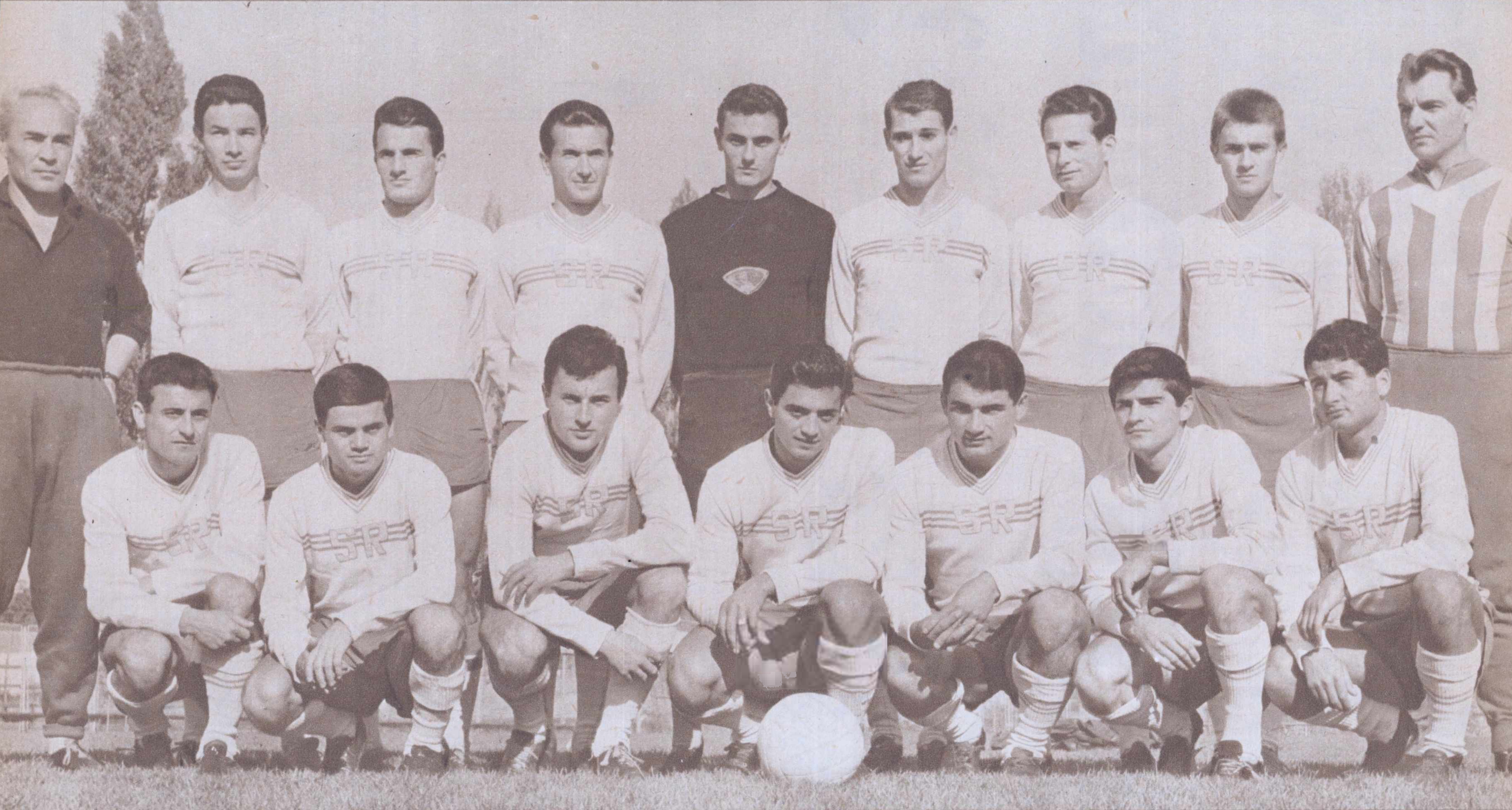
Pescaru (front row, second from the right) with Brașov in 1965

He spent a total of 19 seasons at Steagul, serving as the team's captain for approximately 13–14 seasons, and was known for telling his teammates:"You have to defend the honor of being flagbearers!". The highlights of this period were a fourth place in the 1964–65 Divizia A season and 11 games played in European competitions (including seven matches in the Inter-Cities Fairs Cup). He scored a goal in the 1965–66 Inter-Cities Fairs Cup 4–2 victory against Espanyol Barcelona and played in the 3–2 win on aggregate against Beşiktaş in the 1974–75 UEFA Cup. During these years, the club was relegated twice to Divizia B, but Pescaru stayed with the club, helping it get promoted back to the first division each time.

Pescaru played his last Divizia A match on 23 November 1980 in a 3–1 away loss to Progresul București. In this competition he is Steagul's leader in both appearances and goals, totaling 311 matches with 62 goals. Pescaru went to play one season for Divizia B side, Șoimii IPA Sibiu, retiring in 1982.

== International career ==
Pescaru played three friendly games for Romania, making his debut under coach Angelo Niculescu, when he came as a substitute and replaced Ion Dumitru at half-time in a 2–0 loss to France. His following two games were a 2–2 draw against Peru and a 2–0 loss against the Soviet Union. Pescaru was a member of Steagul Roșu Brașov's "Mexican trio", as together with Stere Adamache and Mihai Ivăncescu they were part of Romania's 1970 Mexico World Cup squad. However, coach Niculescu did not play him in any games there. For the participation in that tournament he was decorated by President of Romania Traian Băsescu on 25 March 2008 with the Ordinul "Meritul Sportiv" — (The Medal "The Sportive Merit") class III.

== Managerial career ==
Pescaru worked as a junior coach. He also coached Steagul Roșu Brașov's senior team on two occasions, and accumulated a total of 46 Divizia A matches as coach.

== Personal life and death ==
His father, also a footballer who played at Dinamo Brașov, advised Pescaru that if he were to become a footballer, he should play for Steagul Roșu Brașov.

Pescaru died of cardiorespiratory arrest on 25 May 2019 at the age of 76. A book about him was written by Adrian Toth titled Nicolae Pescaru, prințul brașovean al sportului rege (Nicolae Pescaru, the Brașov prince of the kingly sports), which was released on 27 March 2026, a date that signified 83 years since his birth.

== Honours ==
Steagul Roșu Brașov

- Divizia B: 1968–69, 1979–80
