= Renato Kanu =

Brazilian footballer

Personal information
- Full name: Renato Pereira da Silva Alberto
- Date of birth: 27 October 1985 (age 41)
- Place of birth: São Paulo, Brazil
- Height: 1.80 m (5 ft 11 in)
- Position: Striker

Senior career*
Years	Team	Apps	(Gls)
2005–2006	Club América		
2006–2007	Zacatepec		
2008	Uberlândia		
2009	Nacional		
2009	Taboão da Serra		
2009–2011	Penafiel	47	(2)
2011–2012	FC Brașov	9	(0)
2013	Atlético Taboão da Serra		
2014	São Carlos		
- * Club domestic league appearances and goals as of 16 June 2011

Renato Pereira da Silva Alberto (born 27 October 1985 in São Paulo), known as Renato Kanu, is a Brazilian former football striker.
