= Adâncata, Ialomița =

Adâncata
- Commune
- Location in Ialomița County

- Location in Romania
- Coordinates: 44°46′N 26°26′E
- Country: Romania
- County: Ialomița

Government
  - Mayor (2020–2024): Ionel-Valentin Barbu (PNL)
- Area: 44.82 km^{2} (17.31 sq mi)
- Elevation: 64 m (210 ft)
- Population (2021-12-01): 2,398
  - Density: 53.50/km^{2} (138.6/sq mi)
- Time zone: UTC+02:00 (EET)
  - Summer (DST): UTC+03:00 (EEST)
- Postal code: 927005
- Area code: +(40) 243
- Vehicle reg.: IL
- Website: www.adincata.ro

Adâncata is a commune located in Ialomița County, Muntenia, Romania. It is composed of two villages, Adâncata and Patru Frați.

== Geography ==
The commune is situated in the Wallachian Plain, at an altitude of 64 m (210 ft). It lies on the banks of the Prahova River and its left tributary, the Cricovul Sărat. The Prahova River flows into the Ialomița River at the southern edge of Patru Frați village.

Adâncata is located in the western part of Ialomița County, bordering on Prahova County. It is 22 km (14 mi) from Urziceni and 86 km (53 mi) from the county seat, Slobozia. The national capital, Bucharest, is 53 km (33 mi) to the southwest, while the city of Ploiești is 47 km (29 mi) to the northwest.

Historical population
Year	Pop.	±%
1899	1,575	—
1925	1,815	+15.2%
2002	3,115	+71.6%
2011	2,723	−12.6%
2021	2,398	−11.9%
Source: Census data

== Natives ==
- Mihai Ivăncescu (1942 – 2004), footballer
- Vasile Jercălău (born 1968), footballer

== Other ==
The following entities are located in Adâncata.

- The 114th SAM Battalion "Șoimii Bărăganului" (the "Bărăgan Eagles") of the Romanian 1st Surface to Air Missiles Brigade.
- The MotorPark Romania racing track, with a length of 4.129 km (2.566 mi).
