= Daniel Bălașa =

Romanian footballer

Personal information
- Full name: Daniel Ilie Bălașa
- Date of birth: 6 August 1981 (age 45)
- Place of birth: Târgu Jiu, Romania
- Height: 1.81 m (5 ft 11 in)
- Position: Centre back

Youth career
- 1995–1999: CSȘ Târgu Jiu
- 1999–2000: "N. Dobrin" Pitești

Senior career*
Years	Team	Apps	(Gls)
2000–2001	Metalul Plopeni	17	(0)
2001	Astra Ploiești	4	(0)
2001–2002	Metalul Plopeni	4	(0)
2002	Brașov	8	(0)
2002–2008	Zimbru Chișinău	71	(1)
2008–2010	Argeș Pitești	49	(2)
2010–2011	Brașov	4	(0)
2011–2013	Zimbru Chișinău	31	(3)
2013	CF Brăila	8	(0)
2013–2014	FCU Craiova	5	(0)
2015	Știința Turceni		
2015	Filiași		
2016	Măgura Cisnădie		
2016–2017	Filiași		
2017–2018	Internațional Bălești	25	(0)
2018–2019	Petrolul Țicleni	22	(1)
2019–2020	Vulturii Fărcășești	14	(2)
Total		262	(9)

Managerial career
- 2024: ARO Câmpulung (assistant)
- * Club domestic league appearances and goals as of 14:52, 8 December 2024 (UTC)

Daniel Ilie Bălașa (born 6 August 1981) is a Romanian former football player who played as a centre back for teams such as Metalul Plopeni, Zimbru Chișinău or FC Argeș Pitești, among others. In his career Bălașa played for teams such as Metalul Plopeni, Zimbru Chișinău or Argeș Pitești, among others.

== Honours ==
Zimbru Chișinău

- Moldovan National Division:

Runner-up: 2002–03, 2005–06, 2006–07
3rd place: 2003–04, 2011–12

- Moldovan Cup: 2002–03, 2003–04, 2006–07
