= Ezequias =

Brazilian footballer (born 1981)

Personal information
- Full name: Ezequias Roosevelt Tavares de Melo
- Date of birth: 28 January 1981 (age 45)
- Place of birth: Jundiaí, Brazil
- Height: 1.80 m (5 ft 11 in)
- Position: Left back

Team information
- Current team: Independente-PA

Youth career
- 2000–2001: Corithians-AL

Senior career*
Years	Team	Apps	(Gls)
2001–2005	Marítimo	60	(0)
2001–2002	Marítimo B	12	(1)
2005	→ Gil Vicente (loan)	16	(0)
2005–2006	Académica	26	(0)
2006–2008	Porto	1	(0)
2007	→ Beira-Mar (loan)	8	(0)
2007–2008	→ Leixões (loan)	25	(0)
2008–2010	Braşov	50	(1)
2010–2012	Rapid București	35	(0)
2013	Corithians-AL		
2014	Santa Cruz-PA		
2015–2016	Independente-PA	6	(1)
2016	Águia Marabá	5	(0)
2017	Independente-PA	12	(0)
2017	Trem	2	(0)
2018–	Independente-PA	18	(1)
- * Club domestic league appearances and goals as of 13 November 2020

Ezequias Roosevelt Tavares de Melo (born 28 January 1981), known simply as Ezequias, is a Brazilian professional footballer who plays for Independente-PA as a left back.

He played for several teams during his professional career, in Brazil, Portugal and Romania.

== Football career ==
Born in Jundiaí, São Paulo, Ezequias started playing football with lowly Sport Club Corinthians Alagoano. He would then spend the following seven seasons in Portugal, with C.S. Marítimo – where he arrived in 2001 alongside Pepe, later of FC Porto, Real Madrid and the Portugal national team fame – Gil Vicente FC, Académica de Coimbra, Porto, S.C. Beira-Mar and Leixões SC, the latter two loaned by the Primeira Liga club after being unable to impress (only one league appearance, a 1–2 away loss against S.C. Braga).

In the middle of 2008, Ezequias was finally released by Porto and signed with Romania's FC Brașov. Two years later, after two seasons as first-choice, he moved to another team in that country and its Liga I, FC Rapid București.

== Personal life ==
For reasons unknown to him, Ezequias' second name was an homage to American president Franklin D. Roosevelt.
