= Mihai Ivăncescu =

Romanian footballer

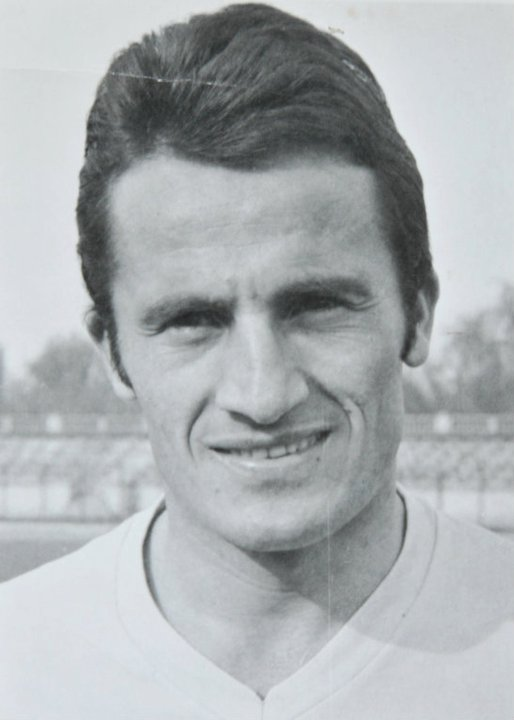

Personal information
- Date of birth: 22 March 1942
- Place of birth: Adâncata, Romania
- Date of death: 1 February 2004 (aged 61)
- Place of death: Brașov, Romania
- Height: 1.75 m (5 ft 9 in)
- Position: Right back

Youth career
- 1956–1961: Steagul Roșu Brașov

Senior career*
Years	Team	Apps	(Gls)
1961–1962	Steagul Roșu Brașov	12	(2)
1962–1964	Tractorul Brașov		
1964–1973	Steagul Roșu Brașov	227	(11)
1973–1975	Tractorul Brașov (Note: The statistics for the 1974–75 Divizia B season are unavailable.)	31	(0)
Total		270	(13)

International career
1967–1968	Romania	3	(0)
- * Club domestic league appearances and goals

Mihai Ivăncescu (22 March 1942 – 1 February 2004) was a Romanian footballer who played as a right back for two Brașov teams, Steagul and Tractorul.

== Club career ==
Ivăncescu was born on 22 March 1942 in Adâncata, Romania. He began playing junior-level football in 1956, aged 14 at Steagul Roșu Brașov. He made his Divizia A debut, playing for Steagul on 24 September 1961 under coach Silviu Ploeșteanu in a 2–1 home victory against Dinamo București. After one and a half seasons he went to play for neighboring Brașov team, Tractorul, in Divizia B. Ivăncescu returned to Steagul in 1964, where he would remain for the following nine seasons, the highlight of this period being a fourth place in the 1964–65 Divizia A season. He also played four games in the 1965–66 Inter-Cities Fairs Cup as the club got past NK Zagreb in the first round, but got eliminated in the following one by Espanyol Barcelona against whom he scored two goals in the 4–2 win in the second leg. At the end of the 1967–68 season, the team was relegated to Divizia B, but Ivăncescu stayed with the club, helping the team get promoted back to the first division after one year. He played his last Divizia A match on 28 April 1973 in a 1–0 home loss to Dinamo, totaling 209 appearances with 13 goals in the competition. Afterwards, Ivăncescu returned to play in Divizia B for the last two seasons of his career at Tractorul Brașov. On 6 April 1976 at the Tractorul stadium he had his retirement match, playing the first half for Tractorul and the second for Steagul.

== International career ==
Ivăncescu played three friendly games for Romania, all under the guidance of coach Angelo Niculescu, making his debut on 24 December 1967 in a 1–1 draw against DR Congo. His following two games were a 1–1 draw against Austria and a 0–0 draw against Netherlands. Ivăncescu was a member of Steagul Roșu Brașov's "Mexican trio", as together with Stere Adamache and Nicolae Pescaru they were part of Romania's 1970 Mexico World Cup squad. However, coach Niculescu did not play him in any games there.

== Refereeing career ==
After he retired, Ivăncescu became a football referee, officiating matches including in Romania's top-league, Divizia A.

== Death ==
Ivăncescu died on 1 February 2004 at age 61 at the Brașov county hospital.

== Honours ==
Steagul Roșu Brașov

- Divizia B: 1968–69
