= Diego Gaúcho =

Brazilian footballer (born 1981)

Personal information
- Full name: Diego Goldim
- Date of birth: November 15, 1981 (age 44)
- Place of birth: Porto Alegre, Brazil
- Height: 1.86 m (6 ft 1 in)
- Position: Centre back

Senior career*
Years	Team	Apps	(Gls)
2001–2003	Campinas	-	(-)
2003–2004	Santa Cruz	-	(-)
2004–2005	Nacional-MG	-	(-)
2005–2006	15 de Novembro	-	(-)
2006–2009	Gil Vicente	78	(6)
2009–2011	Leiria	42	(4)
2011	→ Braşov (loan)	9	(0)
2012	Astra Ploieşti	1	(0)
2012–2013	Moreirense	16	(1)
2013	AEL Limassol	6	(1)
- * Club domestic league appearances and goals as of 28 December 2013

Diego Goldim (born 15 November 1981), known as just Diego Gaúcho, is a Brazilian footballer as a defender. Previously he played for Gil Vicente F.C. and in the first half of 2011 for the Romanian Liga I team FC Brașov.
