= Cristian Ionescu =

Romanian footballer

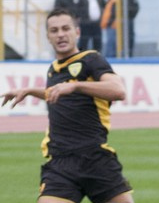

Personal information
- Full name: Cristian Mihai Ionescu
- Date of birth: 1 March 1978 (age 48)
- Place of birth: Bucharest, Romania
- Height: 1.74 m (5 ft 8 1/2 in)
- Position: Left back

Senior career*
Years	Team	Apps	(Gls)
2001–2004	Rapid II București	26	(1)
2002–2003	→ FC Tiraspol (loan)	0	(0)
2004–2005	Rapid București	14	(0)
2005–2006	Sheriff Tiraspol	14	(2)
2006	Petrolul Ploiești	10	(0)
2007	FK Baku	9	(0)
2007–2014	FC Brașov	173	(6)
2014–2015	ACS Berceni	12	(0)
2016–2017	Metalul Reșița	9	(0)

Managerial career
- 2016–2017: Metalul Reșița (fitness coach)
- * Club domestic league appearances and goals as of 2 February 2017

Cristian Ionescu (born 1 March 1978) is a Romanian former footballer. He played as a left back.

== Honours ==
- Sheriff Tiraspol:
  - Moldovan National Division: 2005–06
  - Moldovan Cup: 2006
  - Moldovan Super Cup: 2005
- FC Brașov:
  - Liga II: 2007–08
