= Nicolae Mihai =

Romanian footballer

Personal information
- Date of birth: 1926
- Position: Defender

Senior career*
Years	Team	Apps	(Gls)
1954–1956	Dinamo Brașov		

International career
1955–1956	Romania	3	(0)
- * Club domestic league appearances and goals

Nicolae Mihai (born 1926, date of death unknown) was a Romanian footballer who played as a defender.

== International career ==
Nicolae Mihai played three friendly matches for Romania, making his debut on 18 September 1955 under coach Gheorghe Popescu I in a 3–2 loss against East Germany. His following two games were a 1–0 victory against Belgium and a 2–0 loss against Bulgaria.
