= Dorin Necula =

Romanian footballer

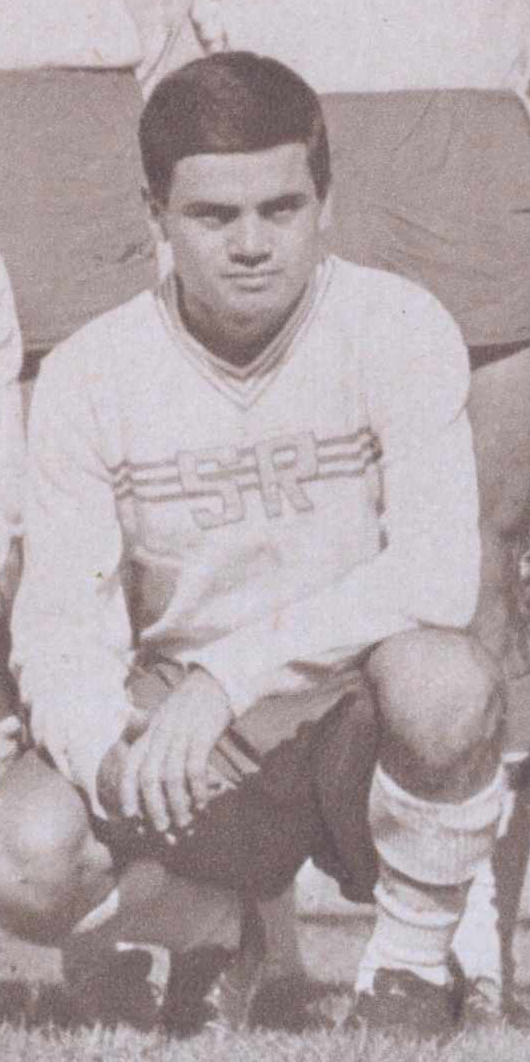

Personal information
- Date of birth: 23 May 1943 (age 83)
- Place of birth: Codlea, Romania
- Height: 1.68 m (5 ft 6 in)
- Position: Striker

Youth career
- Dinamo Brașov

Senior career*
Years	Team	Apps	(Gls)
1961–1972	Steagul Roșu Brașov	206	(49)
1972–1973	Metrom Brașov	14	(2)
Total		220	(51)
- * Club domestic league appearances and goals

Dorin Necula (born 23 May 1943) is a Romanian former football striker.

== Career ==
Necula was born on 23 May 1943 in Codlea, Romania. During his youth, he practiced tennis and played junior-level football at Dinamo Brașov. He started to play senior-level football at Steagul Roșu Brașov, making his Divizia A debut on 1 April 1962 under coach Silviu Ploeșteanu in a 3–1 away loss to Dinamo Pitești. In the 1962–63 season, he scored a career-best nine goals. Afterwards, Necula played in a 3–1 home loss to Lokomotiv Plovdiv in the first round of the 1963–64 Inter-Cities Fairs Cup. In the 1965–66 Inter-Cities Fairs Cup, he played four games, helping the team get past NK Zagreb in the second round before they were defeated by Espanyol Barcelona in the round of 16. Steagul Roșu suffered relegation at the end of the 1967–68 season, but Necula stayed with the club, scoring eight goals to help them gain promotion back to the first league after one year. On 28 May 1972, he made his last Divizia A appearance in Steagul Roșu's 0–0 draw against Steaua București, totaling 177 matches with 41 goals in the competition. Necula ended his career after playing for Metrom Brașov during the 1972–73 Divizia B season.

== Honours ==
Steagul Roșu Brașov

- Divizia B: 1968–69
