= Willams =

Brazilian footballer (born 1983)

Personal information
- Full name: José Willams da Silva Mendonça
- Date of birth: 5 August 1983 (age 43)
- Place of birth: Maceió, Brazil
- Height: 1.70 m (5 ft 7 in)
- Position: Midfielder

Youth career
- 2001–2005: Corinthians-AL

Senior career*
Years	Team	Apps	(Gls)
2005–2007	Corinthians-AL		
2005–2006	→ Gil Vicente (loan)	23	(1)
2006–2007	→ Paços Ferreira (loan)	4	(0)
2007–2009	Vizela	54	(4)
2009–2010	Trofense	25	(4)
2010–2011	Braşov	24	(0)
2011–2012	Naval	27	(0)
2012–2013	Feirense	12	(0)
2013–2014	Famalicão	26	(0)
2014–2015	Espinho	13	(0)
2015–2016	Fafe	39	(1)
Total		247	(10)
- * Club domestic league appearances and goals as of 12 May 2022

José Willams da Silva Mendonça (born 5 August 1983), known as Willams, is a Brazilian former professional footballer who played as a left midfielder.

He spent most of his career in Portugal, amassing totals of 27 games and one goal over the course of two Primeira Liga seasons and adding 118/8 in the Segunda Liga.

== Club career ==
Born in Maceió, Alagoas, Willams was a youth product at Sport Club Corinthians Alagoano, making his debuts as a senior in 2005. On 5 July of the same year he moved abroad, being loaned to Gil Vicente FC.

Willams made his Primeira Liga debut on 27 August 2005, starting in a 2–0 away win against S.L. Benfica. He scored his first goal in the category on 25 September, netting the last in a home success over F.C. Paços de Ferreira that ended with the same scoreline.

On 21 June 2006, Willams was loaned to Paços de Ferreira in a season-long deal. However, after appearing rarely, he signed a permanent one-year deal with Segunda Liga side F.C. Vizela on 26 May 2007.

In 2009, Willams signed a one-year contract with C.D. Trofense also in the second level. He made his league debut for the club on 16 August, starting and scoring the last in a 3–0 home win over A.D. Carregado.

On 29 June 2010, Willams moved to Romania after agreeing to a one-year deal with FC Brașov. His first appearance in the Liga I occurred on 26 July, in a 1–0 success at ASA Târgu Mureș.

Willams returned to Portugal in 2011, and spent two years with Associação Naval 1º de Maio and C.D. Feirense, both in the second tier. He subsequently resumed his career in Campeonato Nacional de Seniores, representing F.C. Famalicão, S.C. Espinho and AD Fafe.
