= Laurențiu Dumitru =

Romanian footballer

Laurenţiu Dumitru
Personal information
- Full name: Laurenţiu Alexandru Dumitru
- Date of birth: 24 May 1983 (age 43)
- Place of birth: Ploieşti, Romania
- Height: 1.80 m (5 ft 11 in)
- Position: Right back

Youth career
- 1993–2001: Petrolul Ploieşti

Senior career*
Years	Team	Apps	(Gls)
2001–2005	Petrolul Ploieşti	28	(0)
2005	FCM Câmpina	14	(1)
2005–2010	Petrolul Ploieşti	93	(3)
2010–2011	FC Brașov	1	(0)
- * Club domestic league appearances and goals as of 18:00, 7 April (UTC)

Laurenţiu Dumitru (born 24 May 1983) is a Romanian footballer who played most recently for FC Brașov.

Dumitru has spent most of his career playing for Petrolul Ploieşti, and was one of seven players retained by the club after the 2008–09 season.
