= Mihai Mincă =

Romanian footballer (born 1984)

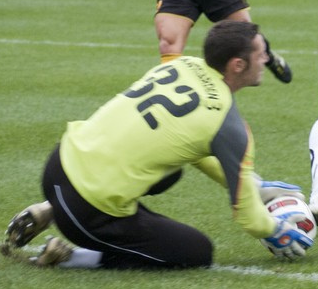
- Mincă with Braşov

Personal information
- Full name: Mihai Adrian Mincă
- Date of birth: 10 August 1984 (age 42)
- Place of birth: Alba Iulia, Romania
- Height: 1.94 m (6 ft 4 in)
- Position: Goalkeeper

Team information
- Current team: CSU Alba Iulia

Senior career*
Years	Team	Apps	(Gls)
2002–2003	Minaur Zlatna	5	(0)
2003–2005	Unirea Alba Iulia	10	(0)
2005–2007	Rapid București	9	(0)
2007–2009	Gloria Buzău	37	(0)
2009–2010	Braşov	29	(0)
2011–2017	CFR Cluj	49	(0)
2017–2018	Șirineasa	3	(0)
2018	→ Voluntari (loan)	11	(0)
2018–2021	Kisvárda	7	(0)
2021–	CSU Alba Iulia		
- * Club domestic league appearances and goals as of 15 May 2021

Mihai Adrian Mincă (born 8 October 1984) is a Romanian professional footballer who plays as a goalkeeper for CSU Alba Iulia.

Mincă joined Rapid București in 2004 from FC Unirea Alba Iulia, where he played on an irregular basis, but since joining has not been a part of the first team. In 2007, he joined Gloria Buzău and at the end of the 2007–08 season he transferred to Astra Ploiesti. On 3 January 2011, he signed a five-year contract with CFR Cluj.

== Honours ==
Rapid Bucuresti

- Cupa României: 2005–06, 2006–07

CFR Cluj

- Cupa României: 2015–16
