= Peter Majerník =

Slovak footballer

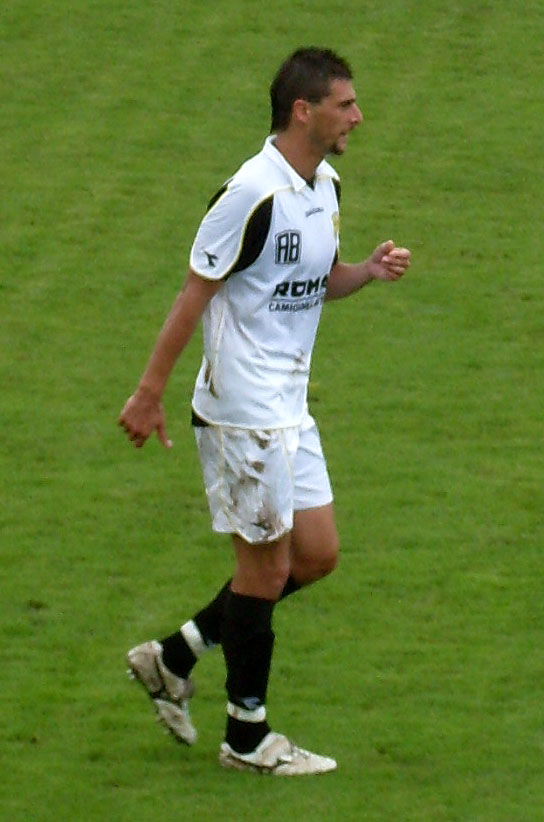

Personal information
- Full name: Peter Majerník
- Date of birth: 31 December 1978 (age 47)
- Place of birth: Piešťany, Czechoslovakia
- Height: 1.88 m (6 ft 2 in)
- Position: Centre back

Team information
- Current team: Inter Bratislava

Senior career*
Years	Team	Apps	(Gls)
1998–2003	ŠKP Devín		
2003–2006	Púchov	85	(5)
2006–2008	Inter Bratislava	52	(2)
2008–2010	Ružomberok	45	(0)
2010–2012	FC Brașov	42	(3)
2012–2013	Myjava	13	(0)
2013–2015	Dunajská Streda	55	(2)
2015–	Inter Bratislava	0	(0)

Managerial career
- 2015–: Inter Bratislava (assistant)
- * Club domestic league appearances and goals as of 7 June 2015

Peter Majerník (born 31 December 1978) is a Slovak footballer who plays as a centre back who plays for FK Inter Bratislava. His former club was FC Brașov, in the Romanian Liga I.
