= Csaba Györffy =

Romanian footballer (1943–2018)

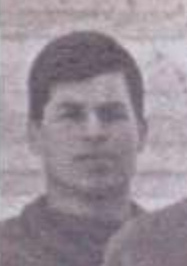

Personal information
- Date of birth: 9 July 1943
- Place of birth: Székelykeresztúr, Hungary (today Cristuru Secuiesc, Romania)
- Date of death: 18 October 2018 (aged 75)
- Place of death: Brașov, Romania
- Position: Winger

Senior career*
Years	Team	Apps	(Gls)
1960–1962	Voința Odorhei		
1962–1964	Mureșul Târgu Mureș		
1964–1966	ASA Târgu Mureș		
1966–1977	Steagul Roșu Brașov	294	(47)

International career
1966	Romania U23	2	(0)
1970	Romania B	3	(0)
1972	Romania Olympic	1	(1)
1967	Romania	1	(0)

Managerial career
- 1991: FC Brașov
- 1996: FC Brașov
- * Club domestic league appearances and goals

Csaba Györffy (9 July 1943 – 18 October 2018) was a Romanian footballer who played as a winger.

== Club career ==
Györffy was born on 9 July 1943 in Székelykeresztúr, Hungary (today Cristuru Secuiesc, Romania). He began playing football in 1960 at Voința Odorhei before moving two years later to Mureșul Târgu Mureș. Subsequently, he went to ASA Târgu Mureș in 1964 for a two-season spell. Györffy then joined Steagul Roșu Brașov. He played three matches in the 1965–66 Inter-Cities Fairs Cup, as the team was defeated by Espanyol Barcelona in the round of 16. Following the 4–2 second-leg victory against Espanyol, Alfredo Di Stéfano presented Györffy with an offer to join the Spanish club. He turned it down, knowing that accepting it would mean risking never seeing his family again under Romania's communist regime. Györffy made his Divizia A debut on 15 May 1966 under coach Silviu Ploeșteanu in a 1–1 draw against Universitatea Craiova.

Györffy was the player who inspired Steagul Roșu to change its official colors from white and blue to black and yellow. The change occurred after he went on a tour with Romania's Olympic team to Uruguay in December 1966. After a match against Peñarol, he received the shirt that Alberto Spencer had played in from the opposing team's captain. Györffy was fascinated by the combination of yellow and black stripes and, upon returning to the country, decided to wear the shirt during team training sessions. The decision to officially change the club's colors was made by coach Ploeșteanu, who believed the new colors would make the players more visible on the field. Since January 1967, the team from Brașov has used yellow and black as its official colors, a nod to the Uruguayan club Peñarol.

Steagul Roșu suffered relegation at the end of the 1967–68 season, but Györffy stayed with the club, helping them gain promotion back to the first league after one year. He played four matches during the 1974–75 UEFA Cup campaign, as the team got past Beşiktaş in the first round, but they were defeated by Hamburg in the following round. Steagul Roșu was relegated once again to Divizia B at the end of the 1974–75 season and he spent two more years with the club before retiring in 1977. Györffy accumulated a total of 226 matches and 37 goals in Divizia A.

== International career ==
From 1966 to 1970, Györffy played two games for Romania's under-23 team and three matches for the B side.

Györffy played one game for Romania on 4 January 1967 under coach Bazil Marian in a 1–1 friendly draw against Uruguay, which took place in Montevideo at Estadio Gran Parque Central. He was selected for Romania's 1970 World Cup squad, but after falling ill with bronchitis, Györffy missed the tournament. Györffy also played one game and scored a goal for Romania's Olympic team in a 3–2 loss to Denmark in the 1972 Summer Olympics qualifiers.

== Managerial career ==
After he retired from his playing career, Györffy worked for FC Brașov as a manager, assistant and youth coach in different periods.

== Personal life and death ==
In 2013, Györffy was named Honorary Citizen of Brașov.

Györffy died on 18 October 2018 at the age of 75.

== Honours ==
Steagul Roșu Brașov

- Divizia B: 1968–69
