= Stere Adamache =

Romanian footballer

Sterică Adamache
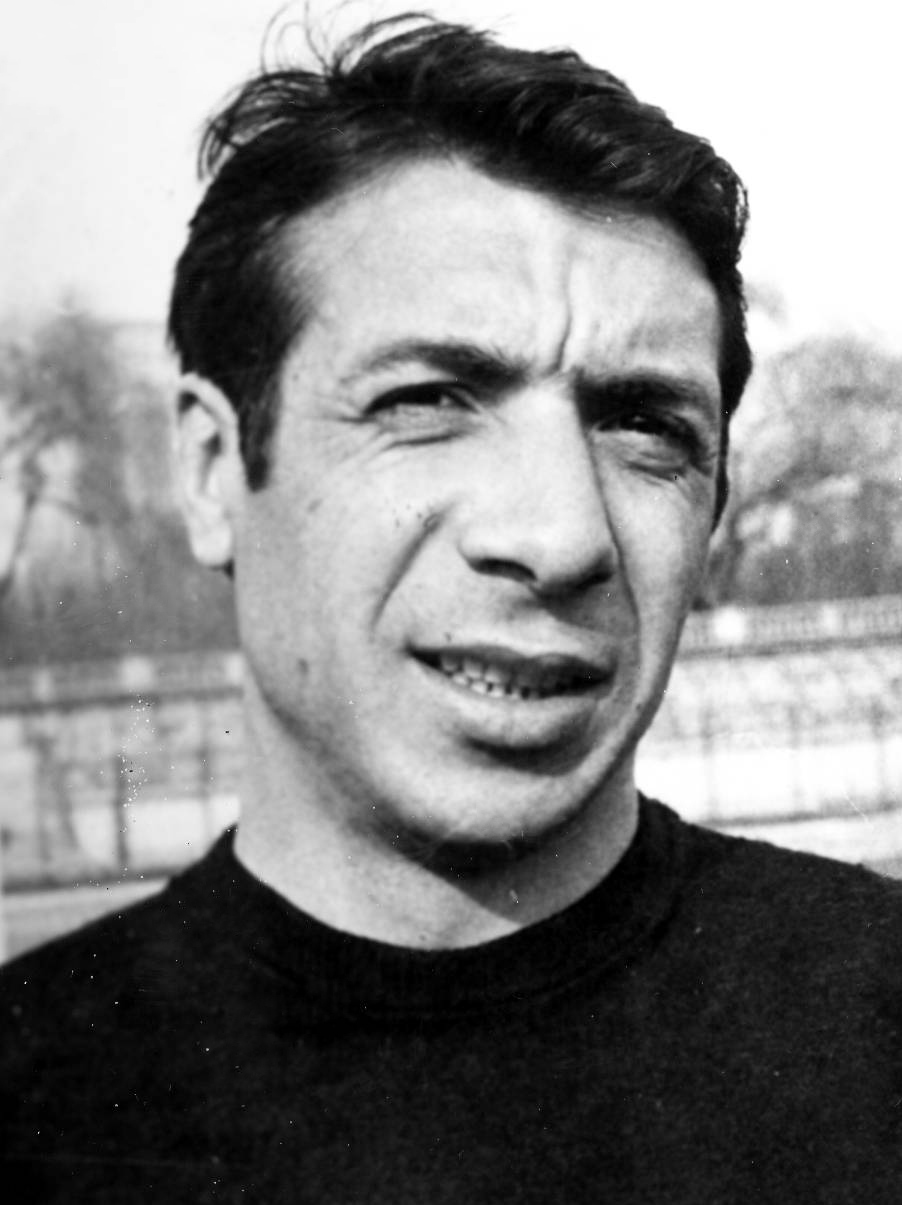

Personal information
- Date of birth: 17 August 1941
- Place of birth: Galați, Romania
- Date of death: 9 July 1978 (aged 36)
- Place of death: Crișan, Romania
- Height: 1.82 m (6 ft 0 in)
- Position: Goalkeeper

Youth career
- 1955–1957: Energia Galați
- 1958: Ancora Galați
- 1959: Știința Galați

Senior career*
Years	Team	Apps	(Gls)
1960–1962	Dinamo Galați		
1962–1963	Viitorul București	5	(0)
1963–1975	Steagul Roșu Brașov	262	(0)
1976–1977	Steagul Roșu Brașov	22	(0)
Total		289	(0)

International career
1962	Romania U18		
1962–1965	Romania U23	4	(0)
1966	Romania B	1	(0)
1970–1972	Romania	7	(0)
- * Club domestic league appearances and goals

Stere "Sterică" Adamache (17 August 1941 – 9 July 1978) was a Romanian football goalkeeper.

== Club career ==
Adamache, nicknamed "Baronul" (The Baron), was born on 17 August 1941 in Galați, Romania. He began playing junior-level football as a field player in 1955 at Energia Galați. He later moved to Ancora Galați, where he started playing as a goalkeeper, and subsequently joined Știința Galați. In 1960, he started his senior career by playing two Divizia B seasons for Dinamo Galați. Adamache made his Divizia A debut on 9 September 1962, playing for Viitorul București under coach Gheorghe Ola in a 0–0 draw against Știința Cluj. Shortly afterwards, the club dissolved and he had offers to play for Steaua București and Steagul Roșu Brașov and after a talk with the latter's coach, Silviu Ploeșteanu, he chose Steagul because he would have had more opportunities to play.

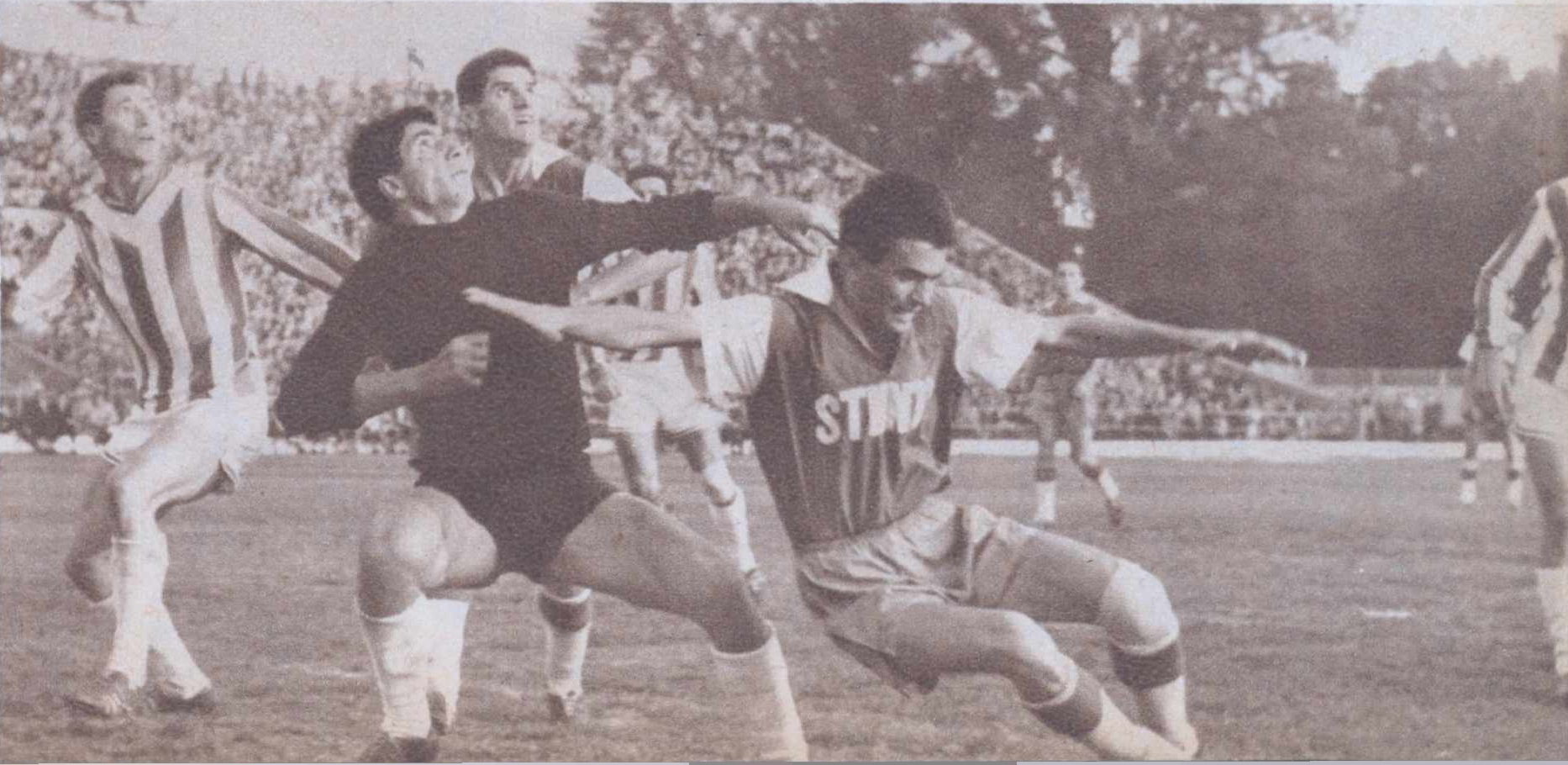
Adamache (in black) during a Divizia A match against Știința Cluj in 1963.

Adamache remained at Steagul over the course of 13 seasons, the highlight of this period being a fourth place in the 1964–65 Divizia A season. He also played 10 games in European competitions, including a 4–2 win over Espanyol Barcelona in the 1965–66 Inter-Cities Fairs Cup and a 3–2 victory on aggregate against Beşiktaş in the 1974–75 UEFA Cup. At the end of the 1967–68 Divizia A season, Steagul was relegated to Divizia B, but he stayed with the club, helping the team get promoted back to the first division after one year. For the way he played in 1972, Adamache was placed fourth in the ranking for the Romanian Footballer of the Year award. He played his last Divizia A match on 29 June 1975 in Steagul's 2–1 home victory against Dinamo București, totaling 253 appearances in the competition. After one year of absence, he came out of retirement to play again for Steagul in the 1976–77 Divizia B season, trying to help them get promoted to Divizia A, but failing to do so.

== International career ==
Under the guidance of coaches Nicolae Dumitrescu and Gheorghe Ola, Adamache helped Romania's under-18 national team win the 1962 European championship. Between 1962 and 1967, he played several games for Romania's under-23 and B squads. He was selected by coach Silviu Ploeșteanu to be part of Romania's Olympic team for the 1964 Summer Olympics in Tokyo.

Adamache played seven games for Romania, making his debut on 28 April 1970 when coach Angelo Niculescu sent him at halftime to replace Rică Răducanu in a 2–0 friendly loss to France. His following two games were a 2–2 draw against Peru and a 2–0 loss against the Soviet Union. Adamache was a member of Steagul Roșu Brașov's "Mexican trio", as together with Mihai Ivăncescu and Nicolae Pescaru they were part of Romania's 1970 Mexico World Cup squad. He was used by coach Niculescu in all three games which were a win against Czechoslovakia and losses to England and Brazil, as his side failed to progress from their group. In the 3–2 loss against the Brazilians, he conceded two goals from Pelé and Jairzinho, being replaced in the 29th minute by Rică Răducanu, thus becoming the first goalkeeper substitution in World Cup history. His last game for the national team was a 2–0 victory against Albania in the 1974 World Cup qualifiers.

== Death ==
Adamache drowned and died at age 36 while swimming in the Danube on 9 July 1978.

== Honours ==
Steagul Roșu Brașov

- Divizia B: 1968–69

Romania U18

- UEFA European Under-18 Championship: 1962

Individual

- Romanian Footballer of the Year (fourth place): 1972
