= Lamine Diarrassouba =

Ivorian footballer

Personal information
- Date of birth: 1 January 1986 (age 40)
- Place of birth: Abidjan, Ivory Coast
- Height: 1.88 m (6 ft 2 in)
- Position: Striker

Youth career
- Satellite

Senior career*
Years	Team	Apps	(Gls)
2006–2008	Al-Sekka Al-Hadid		
2008–2010	Politehnica Iaşi	12	(1)
2010	Braşov	6	(0)
2011	Nîmes	10	(1)
2012–2013	Senica	39	(3)
2014	Znojmo	0	(0)
2016	PSM Makassar	3	(0)
- * Club domestic league appearances and goals

Lamine Diarrassouba (born 1 January 1986) is an Ivorian former professional footballer who played as a striker.

== Career ==
Diarrassaouba joined Politehnica Iaşi Egyptian club Al-Sekka Al-Hadid. He left Romania in January 2009, but re-signed after failed trials on 25 March 2009 on new contract with Politehnica Iaşi. Following the dissolution of Politehnica, he moved to FC Brașov, where he played for a half of a season, before signing with Nîmes Olympique in January 2011. In February 2012, he joined Slovak club FK Senica on a two-year contract.
