= Cătălin Dedu =

Romanian footballer

Personal information
- Full name: Cătălin Iulian Dedu
- Date of birth: 16 May 1987 (age 39)
- Place of birth: Brașov, Romania
- Height: 1.77 m (5 ft 10 in)
- Position: Forward

Youth career
- 2000–2005: FC Brașov

Senior career*
Years	Team	Apps	(Gls)
2004–2005	FC Ghimbav	12	(0)
2005–2012	FC Brașov	103	(16)
2013–2014	Universitatea Cluj	21	
- * Club domestic league appearances and goals as of 23 April 2014

Cătălin Iulian Dedu (born 16 May 1987 in Braşov) is a Romanian football player.
