= Juan Toloza =

Chilean footballer (born 1985)

Personal information
- Full name: Juan Andrés Toloza Cortés
- Date of birth: 4 May 1985 (age 41)
- Place of birth: El Salvador, Chile
- Height: 1.80 m (5 ft 11 in)
- Position: Midfielder

Youth career
- 1998–2003: Cobresal

Senior career*
Years	Team	Apps	(Gls)
2004	Cobresal	1	(0)
2005	Hosanna	–	(–)
2006–2007	Deportes Copiapó	48	(5)
2008	Coquimbo Unido	21	(3)
2009–2013	Unión San Felipe	42	(4)
2011	→ Brașov (loan)	25	(0)
2012	→ Colo-Colo (loan)	3	(0)
2012	→ Colo-Colo B (loan)	3	(2)
2013	→ San Marcos (loan)	6	(0)
2013–2014	Curicó Unido	13	(0)
2014–2016	Unión San Felipe	0	(0)
2014–2016	→ Deportes Copiapó (loan)	43	(1)
2017–2019	Deportes Vallenar	53	(6)
2021	Deportes Colina	10	(2)
Total		268	(23)

Managerial career
- 2026–: Brujas de Salamanca (assistant)
- * Club domestic league appearances and goals

Juan Andrés Toloza Cortés (born 4 May 1985) is a Chilean former footballer who played as a midfielder.

== Club career ==
In 2005, he had a step with Club Social y Deportivo Cristiano Hosanna in the Tercera División.

In 2010, he took part in the Copa Sudamericana with his team Unión San Felipe, scoring a goal in the 4–2 victory against LDU Quito, in the Round of 16 of the competition.

His last club was Deportes Colina in 2021.

== Coaching career ==
In 2026, Toloza joined the technical staff of Brujas de Salamanca as assistant coach.

== Honours ==
Unión San Felipe

- Copa Chile: 2009

Deportes Vallenar

- Segunda División: 2017 Transición
