= Iuliu Jenei =

Romanian footballer (1939–2019)

Personal information
- Date of birth: 23 December 1939
- Place of birth: Câmpia Turzii, Romania
- Date of death: 15 September 2019 (aged 79)
- Position: Central defender

Senior career*
| Years | Team | Apps | (Gls) |
- IS Câmpia Turzii
| 1960–1962 | Știința Timișoara | 20 | (0) |
| 1962–1974 | Steagul Roșu Brașov | 326 | (2) |
| 1975 | CSU Brașov | | |
| Total | | 346 | (2) |
- * Club domestic league appearances and goals

Iuliu Jenei (23 December 1939 – 19 September 2019) was a Romanian football central defender. Ienei was the first player that reached 300 appearances for Steagul Roșu Brașov in the Romanian top-league Divizia A.

== Honours ==
Steagul Roșu Brașov

- Divizia B: 1968–69
