= Adrian Rusu =

Romanian footballer

Personal information
- Date of birth: 28 July 1984 (age 42)
- Place of birth: Arad, Romania
- Height: 1.81 m (5 ft 11 1/2 in)
- Position: Defender

Senior career*
Years	Team	Apps	(Gls)
2003–2004	UTA Arad	25	(1)
2005–2006	Rapid București	1	(0)
2006–2007	UTA Arad	13	(0)
2007–2013	Pandurii Târgu Jiu	98	(3)
2010–2011	→ Braşov (loan)	26	(2)
2013–2015	Şoimii Pâncota	9	(0)
- * Club domestic league appearances and goals as of 22 October 2015 (UTC)

Adrian Rusu (born 28 July 1984) is a Romanian footballer who plays as a central defender. He received the "Meritul Sportiv" Medal in 2006 from president Traian Băsescu.

== Club career ==
Rusu began his professional career with FC UTA Arad in 2003. He played his first professional match with Rapid II București in 2005. Rusu played for Pandurii Târgu-Jiu from 2006 to 2010, then joined FC Brașov in 2010, for a one-season loan.

== Honours ==
=== Club ===
Pandurii

- Liga I (1): runner-up 2013
