= FC Brașov (1936) =

- Full name: Fotbal Club Brașov
- Nicknames: Stegarii (The Flag-bearers); Galben-negrii (The Yellow-Blacks); Copiii Orașului (City's children); Echipa de sub Tâmpa (The Tâmpa Team)
- Short name: Brașov
- Founded: 1936; 90 years ago (as Uzinele Astra Brașov)
- Dissolved: 2017
- Ground: Silviu Ploeșteanu
- Capacity: 8,800
- 2016–17: Liga II, 6th (relegated)
Home colours	Away colours

Fotbal Club Brașov (Romanian pronunciation: [braˈʃov]), commonly known as FC Brașov, or simply as Brașov, was a Romanian professional football club based in Brașov, Brașov County, founded in 1936 and dissolved in 2017.

Originally founded as Uzinele Astra Brașov, its kits were yellow and black, and it played its home matches at the Silviu Ploeșteanu Stadium. The Flag-bearers spent forty-one seasons in the Romanian top flight between 1957 and 2015, finishing as runners-up in the 1959–60 season, and won the Balkans Cup in 1960–61.

Following its dissolution in 2017, two new entities emerged claiming to be the continuation of the dissolved club. SR Brașov was founded by supporters in 2017, while in 2021 FC Brașov – Steagul Renaște was established with the support of the local authorities, which acquired the brand of the original entity.

== History ==
=== 1912–1945: Early years ===
Football in Brașov started between 1912 and 1914. In 1928, the unrelated Colțea Brașov won the national title and enjoyed a decade's long rivalry with Braşovia, the city's other major, which reached the semifinals of the Romanian National League in 1925.

Uzinele Astra Braşov made their debut in the Romanian league system in the 1939–1940 season, when it competed in the Braşov District Championship, finishing 3rd in Group 2. The club achieved promotion to Divizia B next season by winning the District Championship final, but the competition was postponed because of the Second World War. During the war championships (unofficial status), UAB battled for promotion in Divizia A at the end of the 1942–1943, losing the playoffs to Uzinele Metalurgice Cugir. The 1943–1944 season was halted midway because of the Allied bombing missions over Romania. The city of Braşov was, alongside Bucharest and Ploieşti, one of the main targets, and Uzinele Astra Braşov were bombed on two occasions, 16 April and 6 June 1944, sustaining major damages.

=== 1945–1970: Silviu Ploeșteanu era ===
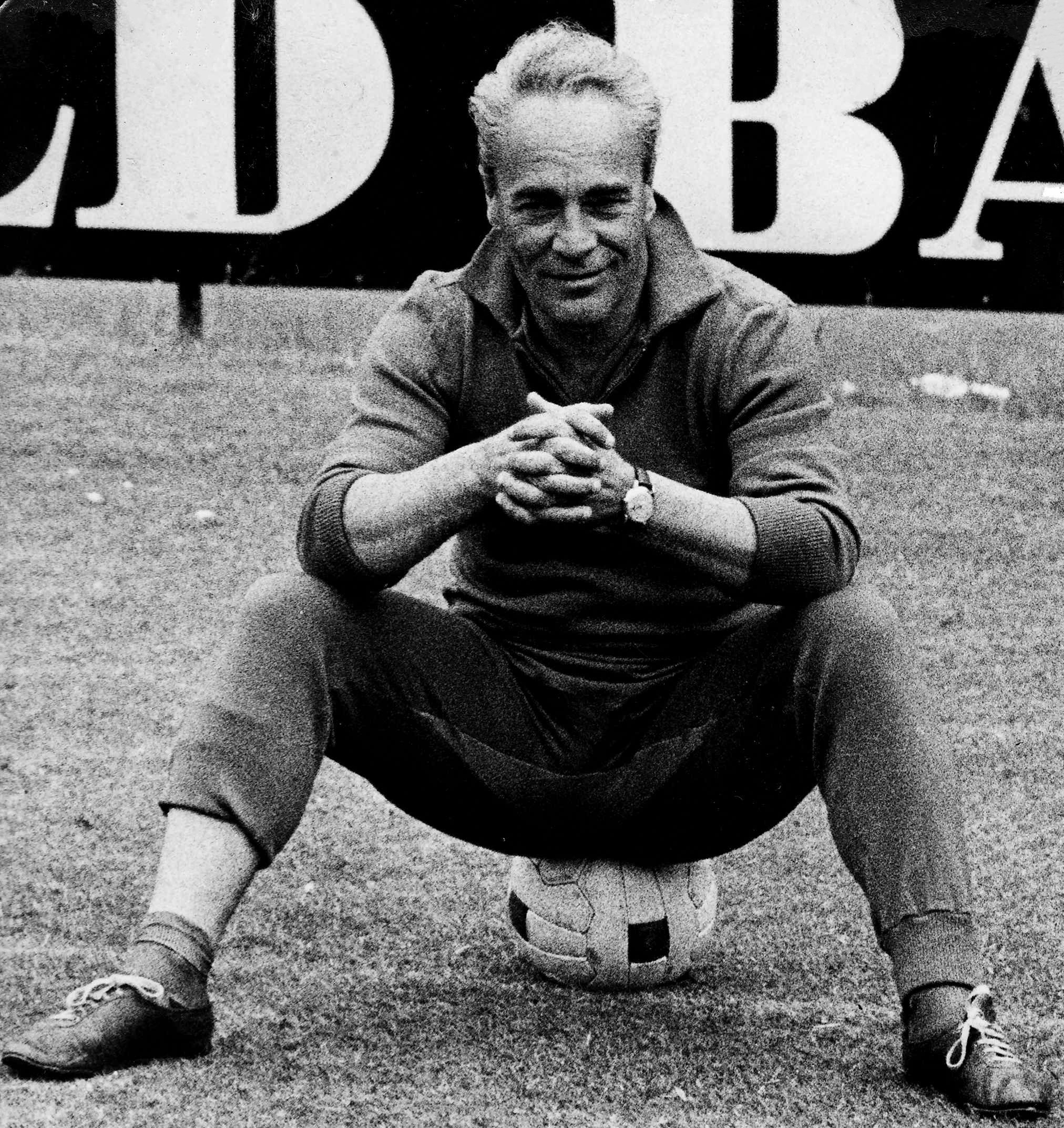
Silviu Ploeșteanu, one of the club's symbols

The club finished 4th în Group I of the District Championship of the 1945–46 season, the first official post war competition, and 3rd in Divizia C 1946–47, in which the starting XI was formed by: Moraru - Orghidan, Szurd - Nichita, Zelenak, Grosaru - Nagy, Antonescu, Herold, Caceavski, Vlad.

Uzinele Astra Brașov’s biggest rival during the 1940–1950 period was ACFR Braşov. In the 1941–42 season, UAB lost the top spot in the District Championship to ACFR on goal difference, and in 1947, they were defeated 4–0 by the same rival in the final for promotion to Divizia B. In 1948, the team was renamed Steagul Roșu Brașov, and Silviu Ploeșteanu—a former pre-war striker and Romanian international—was appointed head coach, a role he would hold for two decades, until 1968.

After winning the District Championship final against ACFR (3–0 at home, 0–0 away) in 1950, the team, under Ploeșteanu's leadership, embarked on a lengthy promotion campaign to reach Divizia B. Steagul Roșu Orașul Stalin—as the team was known after Brașov was renamed Orașul Stalin (lit. 'Stalin City') on 22 August 1950—defeated Armata Câmpulung Muscel in the first round (3–1, 3–0), then eliminated Spartac Curtea de Argeș (9–0, 2–0), Spartac Banca RPR București (4–1, 1–1, 0–3, 4–2, 2–0), and finally Industria Sârmei Brăila in the decisive round (0–0, 2–0).

In the second division, renamed Metalul Orașul Stalin, the team competed in Series I and finished 4th in the 1951 season. This was followed by 6th-place finishes in both the 1952 and 1953 seasons. Renamed again Steagul Roșu, the team obtained a 4th-place finish in 1954, and 9th place in 1955. Later renamed Energia Steagul Roșu, the team finally earned promotion to Divizia A at the end of the 1956 season by winning Series II. Also, the Flag-bearers managed to reach the quarterfinals of the Cupa României, where they were eliminated by Progresul Oradea after a 1–1 draw at home, which allowed the away team to qualify. The basic lineup from that successful campaign included Constantinescu, Bîrsan, Marinescu, Raicu, Aron, Zaharia, Hașoti, Fusulan, Proca, Ciripoi and David.

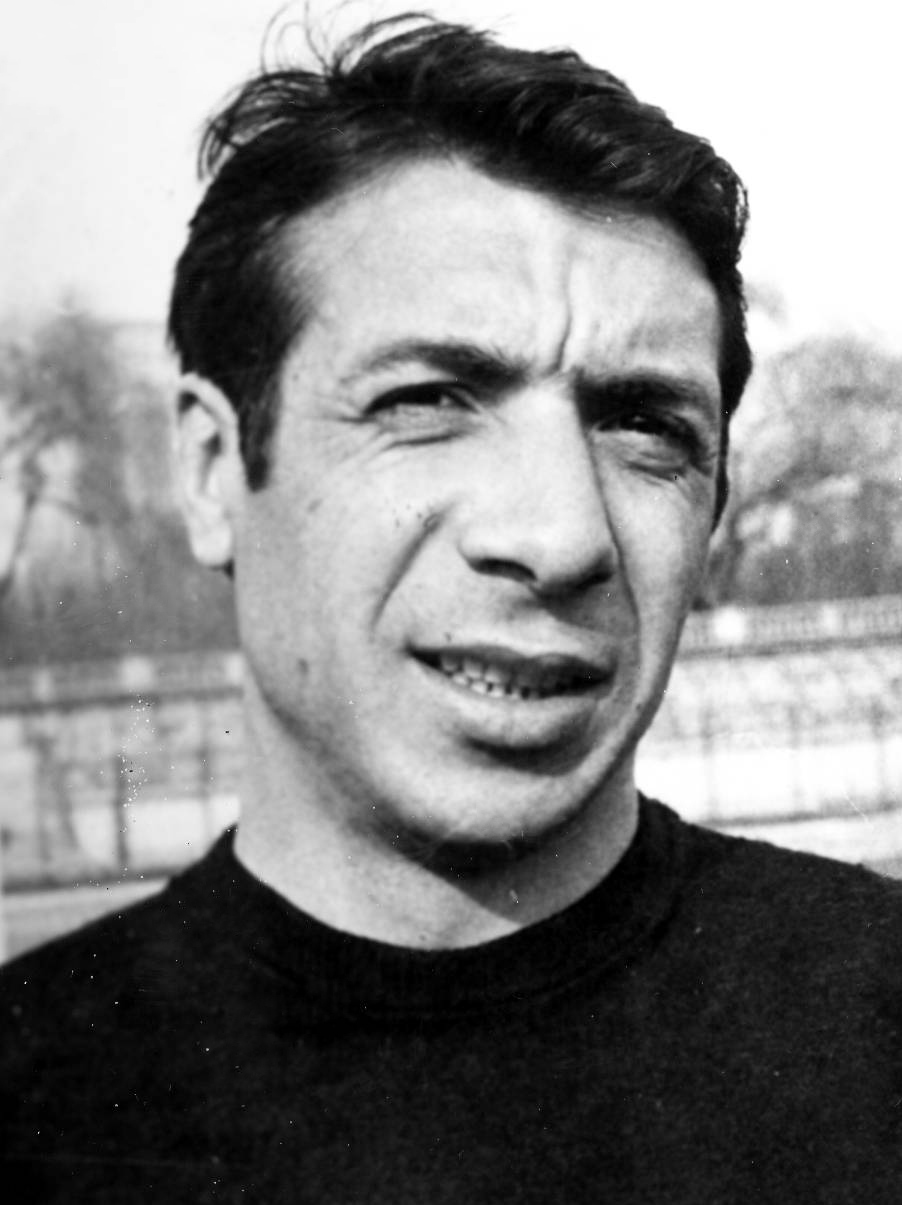
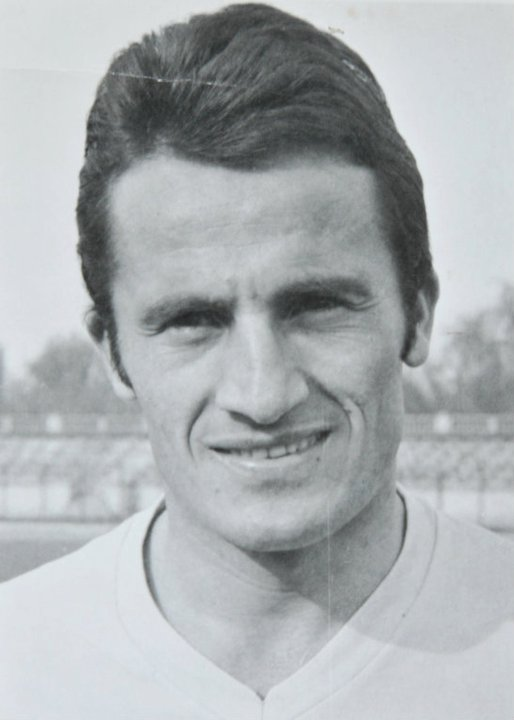
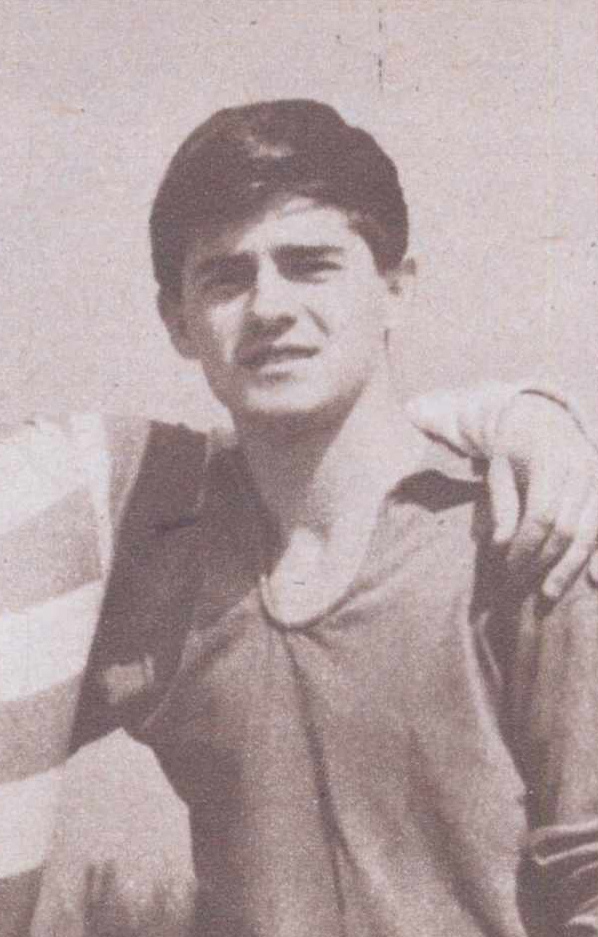
The Mexican trio (left to right): Stere Adamache, Mihai Ivăncescu and Nicolae Pescaru.

In 1960 the team featured; Nicolae Proca, Gheorghe Fusulan, Gheorghe Ciripoi, Tică Constantinescu, Gheorghe Percea, Octavian Zaharia and Gheorghe Raicu; later supplemented by Stephen Hidișan (who continued as coach, a discoverer of talent), Nicolae Campo, Ioan Szigeti, Alexandru Meszaros, Vasile Seredai, Dorin Gane, Valer Târnăveanu and Dorin Necula. The death of Iuliu Năftănăilă on 28 August 1967 shocked the club. Not only had Brașov lost one of its greatest talents, but were obliged to play U Cluj just 48 hours after the funeral. Their following demotion resulted in the replacement of Silviu Ploeșteanu as the coach of the team, replaced by Valentin Stănescu. The following generation is that of the trio Nicolae Pescaru – Stere Adamache – Mihai Ivăncescu, the generation that provided three players to the Romania national team at the World Cup in 1970 at Mexico.

This generation links to the names of Csaba Györffy, Iuliu Jenei, Călin Gane, Marcel Goran, Petru Cadar, Cazar Ardeleanu, Adrian Hârlab and Virgil Grecea – a generation consisting of some of the most long term team members.

=== 1970–2004: The generation of Silviu Ploeșteanu ===
The generation of the 1980s brought the team back on the first stage, after five years of penance in the second division. Players include; Vasile Papuc, Vasile Gherghe, Marian Paraschivescu, Valer Șulea, Costel Spirea, Vasile Bențea, Gherasim Chioreanu, Adrian Furnică, Constantin Manciu, Nicolae Bucur, Nicolae Adami, Mihai Panache and Petre Marinescu, Marius Lăcătuș, Ion Batacliu, Nistor Văidean, Ion Mandoca and Dumitru Stângaciu.

The team were demoted into League "B" for a season.

After the events of December '89, the next generation sent Marian Ivan to the 1994 World Cup in the USA. Players of the time include Tibor Selymes, Ionel Pârvu, Laszlo Polgar, Emil Spirea, Sandu Andrași, Iulian Chiriță, Dorel Purdea, and Marius Todericiu.

The junior teams of FC Brașov began to produce young talent; Alexandru Marc, Marius Constantin, Romeo Surdu, Ioan Coman, Silviu Pintea, Ionuț Vasiliu and Dragoș Luca – the generation formed by "Municipal" or "ICIM", the generation that brought the titles of champions or vice-champions back to Brașov.

In the first round of the 2001–02 UEFA Cup Steagul Roșu met the much more titrated Italian team Inter Milan, but they lost 0–6 on aggregate.

=== 2004–2016: Ups and downs ===
Chart of yearly table positions of SR Brașov in the national leagues

In the 2004–05 season FC Brașov finished in 15th place and were relegated to Liga II. In the following season in Liga II they finished in 3rd place, (after Ceahlăul Piatra Neamț and local rival Forex Brașov a relatively new club at that time) and therefore missed promotion to Liga I.

In the next season FC Brașov finished in 10th place, closer to the relegation than the promotion. But 2007–08 season saw a return to Liga I for the team after they finished in 1st place, with 78 points.

After the promotion FC Brașov finished only in the middle and lower part of the table in their first 4 seasons. Then, in the 2012–13 season they finished on 7th place, the best performance in 10 years. After this good result, next season they finished in 15th place and again faced relegated to Liga II. However, the club was saved by FC Vaslui, which did not receive the license for the next season, being relegated.

2014–15 season was one of restructuring for Liga I which it would have 14 teams instead of 18, at the end of the season relegated the last 6 places instead of 4 with FC Brașov being among them.

In the spring of 2015 FC Brașov had financial problems and went into insolvency. In the summer of 2015 all the team's players changed and the target was promotion to Liga I. But by the end of the season they were in 5th place, outside the promotion places.

In the summer of 2016 the team did not have the budget needed to participate in Liga II and financial problems continued to multiply. The situation was saved with a few weeks before the start of the new season when Alexandru Chipciu, a former player of the team, was sold by Steaua București to Anderlecht and FC Brașov received a stake in the transfer. Cornel Țălnar was named the new manager and the goal was still promotion, considered the only financial recovery solution of the club. The team started well, but finished the season in 7th place.

After the end of the championship, FC Brașov announced that the team will not join the new season of Liga II, and was declared bankrupt.

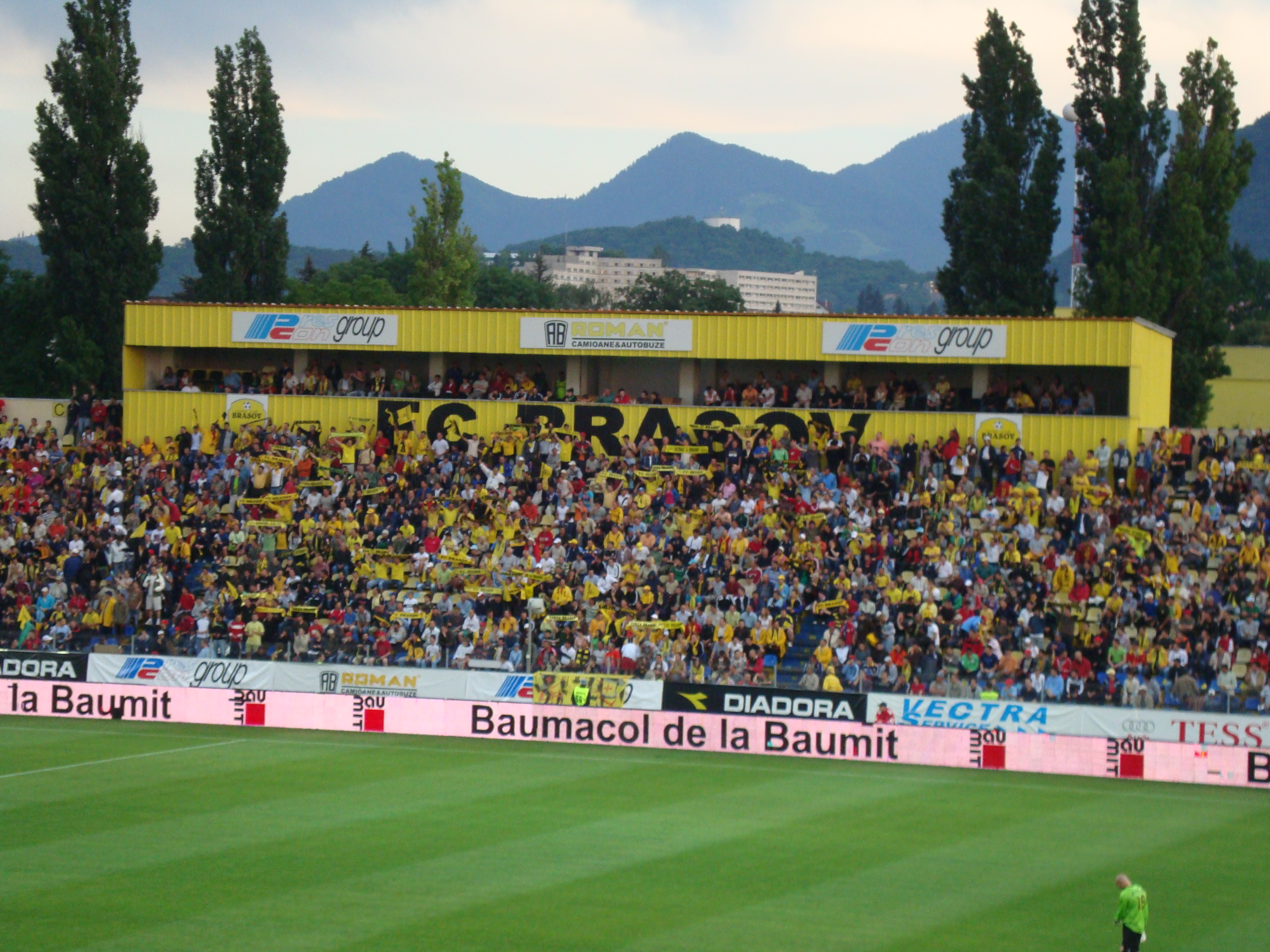
FC Braşov supporters

=== 2016–present: Successors ===
In the summer of 2017 The Flag-bearers Supporters League announced the establishment of AS SR (meaning: Asociația Sportivă Steagul Roșu - The Red Flag Sporting Association) Brașov, club set up by the model followed by FC Vaslui, Petrolul Ploiești, Oțelul Galați or Farul Constanța, big clubs in Romanian football which were also dissolved and brought back to life by their supporters.

In the summer of 2021, Corona Brașov merged with ACS Scotch Club (FC Brașov brand bearer) and established FC Brașov (2021). The supporters refused to support the new project.

The Romanian Football Federation announced before the start of the 2021–22 Liga II championship, that Brașov city hall, the owner of the logo, history and all of FC Brașov's football records, approves the use of these by FC Brașov (2021). So from a legal point of view, from now on, this team will be considered as the official and legal successor of the old FC Brașov (1936) team.

== Crest and colours ==
=== Crest ===
The club's coat of arms is in the form of a shield showing the club's name and the city's symbol, a tree trunk with 13 silver roots the 13 communes of Tără Bârsei emerging from a golden crown with three lobes the symbol of power. The shield is stamped by a silver mural crown, consisting of seven towers the specific insignia for county seat municipalities. The overall meaning of the coat of arms is "Wisdom and Power forever rule the Citadel". The coat of arms was approved by the National Commission of Heraldry, within the Romanian Academy. The current coat of arms was chosen in 2008 after several coats of arms. After the disbandment of the club, the supporters' team tried to keep the phenomenon alive and created a new coat of arms. In 2021, the FC Brașov Steagu Renaște club came into existence, which has the right to use the crest of the disbanded club.

=== Colours ===
At start the club had white and blue as the club's official colors. These remained the colors of the team until December 1966. The change came following a tournament of Romania's Olympic football team in Uruguay.

After a match with Peñarol, Csaba Györffy, player at FC Brasov, received from Peñarol's captain Alberto Spencer the shirt with which he played. Györffy was fascinated by the combination of yellow and black stripes and decided at the return in the country to wear the shirt during his training sessions with the team.

The decision to change the colors of the club was taken by coach Silviu Ploeșteanu, who considered that, in the new colors, the team will be seen better on the field. Since January 1967, the team from Brașov has yellow-black as official colors, recalling the Uruguayan Peñarol team.

== Stadium ==
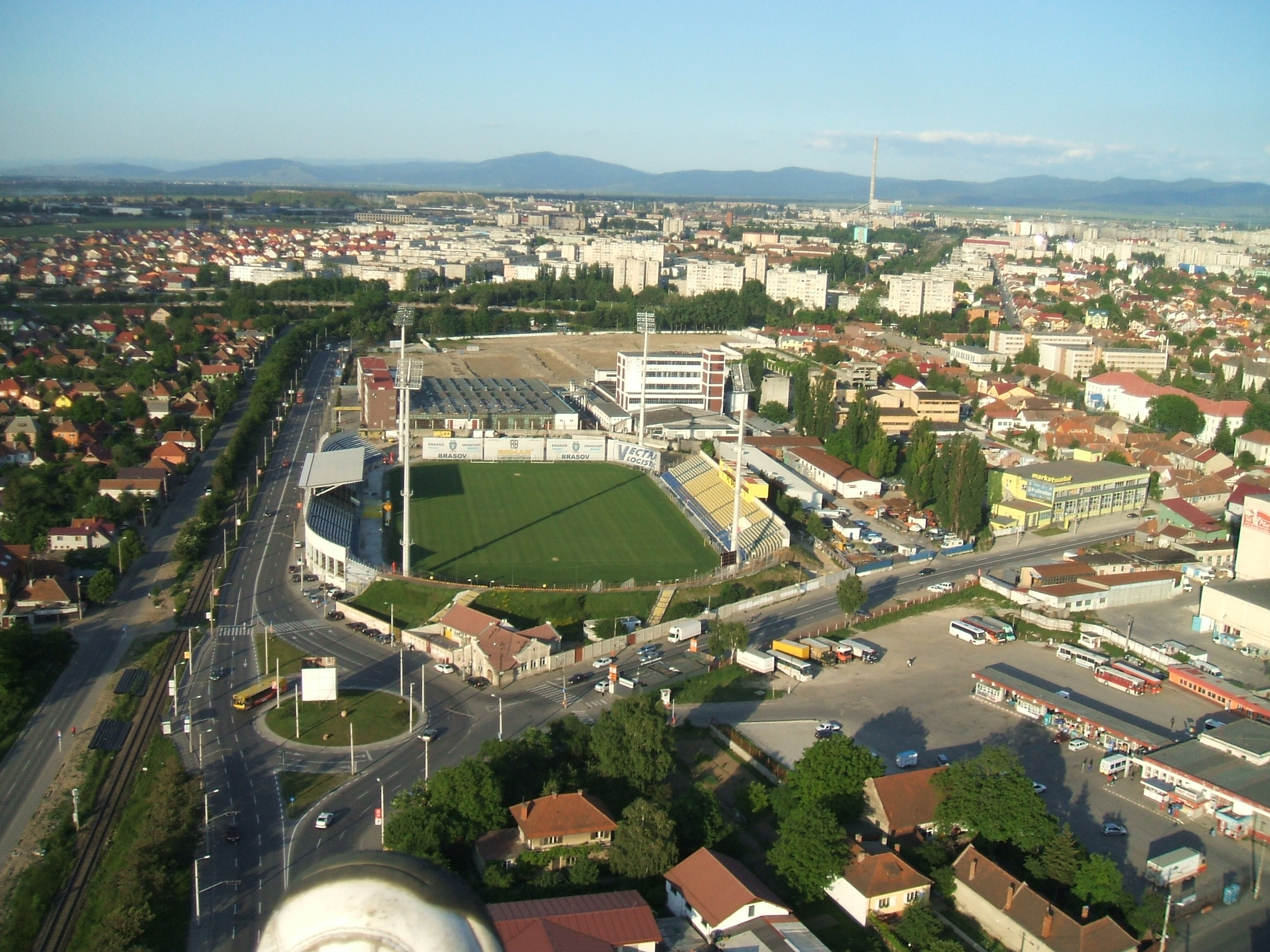
Stadionul Silviu Ploeșteanu

Stadionul Silviu Ploeșteanu, previously known as Stadionul Tineretului, is a multi-purpose stadium in Brașov, Romania. It was built in 1936 and was called "King Carol II" Stadium. It is currently used mostly for football matches and is the home ground of FC Brașov and Corona Brașov. The arena was named after Silviu Ploeșteanu (1913–1969) on April 13, 2002, who managed the club between for 20 years. The central section of the stadium's north stand is the second oldest in Romanian football, its lateral sections being completed in 1980. The south stand was built in 1956, and the east and west stands were inaugurated in the 1969–70 season. The east stand was eventually demolished in the summer of 2008. In 2009, the night installation was inaugurated, in a championship match against Gaz Metan Mediaș.

Municipal Stadium was a sports arena in the city of Brașov. It was located in the Bartolomeu district of Brașov. The stadium was built in the 70s and was demolished in 2008 because it was wanted to build a modern arena in its place. However, due to lack of funds the project stopped immediately after the stadium was demolished.

== Support ==
FC Brașov had many supporters in Brașov County. The ultras groups of SR Brașov are organized in The Flag-bearers Supporters League and they have friendly relations with Gaz Metan Mediaş and Ceahlăul Piatra Neamţ's fans.

== Statistics and records ==
In its long history, the club under Tâmpa has had 65 technicians who took on the role of head coach. The first coach of the club was Silviu Ploeșteanu who occupied the bench for 20 years in which he achieved historic performances, being very close to the national title in the 1959-60 season. Nicolae Proca is the second coach who managed to place the flag in 3rd place, having 5 active mandates until his death in 2007. Former international players who achieved unforgettable performances were also listed on the bench, for example Marius Lăcătuș, Ilie Dumitrescu and Ioan Andone. In 1948, he took over the command of the Red Banner in Brașov. In 1945, under the pressure of the new regime, the club reorganized under the presidency of the engineer Ion Pateanu and the head of the football section, Theodor Banesiu, and when the championship resumed in the 1946-47 edition, the club changed its name to UAB Brașov , occupying third place in the Divizia C at the end of the season. One of the club's longest-serving presidents was Romeo Pascu, who is known for his bizarre matches from the early 90s to the 00s. After this, the post was occupied by several people, one of them being Dinu Gheorghe, but the one who occupied the position for a longer time was the owner Ioan Neculaie, who was known by the nickname Berlusconi of Brașov due to his business success. In 1995, Iosif Kovacs came to FC Brașov where he held several management positions until 2004. From December 2010, he returned to FC Brașov where he held the position of executive president.

== Honours ==
=== Domestic ===
- Liga I
  - Runners-up (1): 1959–60
- Liga II
  - Winners (6): 1956, 1968–69, 1979–80, 1983–84, 1998–99, 2007–08
  - Runners-up (2): 1976–77, 1978–79

=== European ===
- Balkans Cup
  - Winners (1): 1960–61
