= 2004–05 FC Vaslui season =

FC Vaslui
2004–05 season
- Owner: (Romania) Adrian Porumboiu
- President: (Romania) Ciprian Damian
- Manager: (Romania) Ioan Sdrobiş (Resigned on 22 Nov 2004) (Romania) Mircea Rednic (From 15 January 2005)
- Stadium: Municipal
- Divizia B: 1st
- Cupa României: Round 6, eliminated
- Top goalscorer: League: (Romania) Florin Popescu (12); All: (Romania) Valentin Badea (12) (Romania) Florin Popescu (12)
- Highest home attendance: 11,000 vs Dacia Unirea Brăila (11 May 2005)
- Lowest home attendance: 1,700 vs AS Midia Năvodari (22 August 2004)

The 2004–05 season is FC Vaslui's 3rd season of its existence, and its 2nd in a row, in Divizia B. After failing in the previous season to promote, the team's objective this season, was the same. From the beginning of the championship, FC Vaslui started very well, and finished 1st, with 10 points in front of the 2nd team. And so, FC Vaslui promoted in Divizia A, for the first time in its history, this being the most important achievement in its history.

== Squad ==
As of 11 June 2005 Note: Flags indicate national team as defined under FIFA eligibility rules; some limited exceptions apply. Players may hold more than one non-FIFA nationality.

No.	Pos.	Nation	Player
-	GK	(Romania) ROU	Marius Bratu
-	GK	(Romania) ROU	Gabriel Kajcsa
-	GK	(Romania) ROU	Mihai Tătaru
-	DF	(Romania) ROU	Emanuel Amarandei
-	DF	(Romania) ROU	Szesci Barna
-	DF	(Romania) ROU	Daniel Bălan
-	DF	(Romania) ROU	Norocel Chişereanu
-	DF	(Romania) ROU	Radu Ciobanu
-	DF	(Romania) ROU	Vasile Feraru
-	DF	(Romania) ROU	Bogdan Panait
-	DF	(Romania) ROU	Alin Pânzaru
-	DF	(Romania) ROU	Valentin Stancu
-	MF	(Romania) ROU	Cristian Ciubotariu

No.	Pos.	Nation	Player
-	MF	(Romania) ROU	Florin Croitoru
-	MF	(Romania) ROU	Sorin Frunză
-	MF	(Romania) ROU	Alexandru Nicolae
-	MF	(Romania) ROU	Horaţiu Popa
-	MF	(Guinea) GUI	Mbemba Sylla
-	MF	(Romania) ROU	Sorin Ungurianu
-	MF	(Brazil) BRA	Nivaldo Vieira Lima
-	FW	(Romania) ROU	Valentin Badea
-	FW	(Moldova) MDA	Viorel Frunză
-	FW	(Nigeria) NGA	Gideon Ebijitimi
-	FW	(Romania) ROU	Filip Popescu
-	FW	(Romania) ROU	Tihamer Török

== Statistics ==
=== Appearances and goals ===
Last updated on 11 June 2005.

No.	Pos	Nat	Player	Total		Divizia B		Cupa României	
No.	Pos	Nat	Player	Apps	Goals	Apps	Goals	Apps	Goals
-	GK	(Romania) ROU	Marius Bratu	6	3	6	3	0	0
-	GK	(Romania) ROU	Gabriel Kajcsa	23	11	23	11	0	0
-	GK	(Romania) ROU	Mihai Tătaru	0	0	0	0	0	0
-	DF	(Romania) ROU	Emanuel Amarandei	29	0	29	0	0	0
-	DF	(Romania) ROU	Szesci Barna	1	0	1	0	0	0
-	DF	(Romania) ROU	Daniel Bălan	15	0	15	0	0	0
-	DF	(Romania) ROU	Norocel Chişereanu	6	0	5+1	0	0	0
-	DF	(Romania) ROU	Radu Ciobanu	4	0	1+3	0	0	0
-	DF	(Romania) ROU	Vasile Feraru	7	0	4+3	0	0	0
-	DF	(Romania) ROU	Bogdan Panait	29	1	28	1	1	0
-	DF	(Romania) ROU	Alin Pânzaru	21	2	13+7	1	1	1
-	DF	(Romania) ROU	Valentin Stancu	17	0	16	0	1	0
-	MF	(Romania) ROU	Cristian Ciubotariu	2	0	2	0	0	0
-	MF	(Romania) ROU	Florin Croitoru	11	1	6+5	1	0	0
-	MF	(Romania) ROU	Sorin Frunză	15	3	15	3	0	0
-	MF	(Romania) ROU	Alexandru Nicolae	5	0	2+3	0	0	0
-	MF	(Romania) ROU	Horaţiu Popa	24	2	11+12	1	1	1
-	MF	(Guinea) GUI	Mbemba Sylla	9	1	9	1	0	0
-	MF	(Romania) ROU	Sorin Ungurianu	25	1	21+3	1	1	0
-	MF	(Brazil) BRA	Nivaldo Vieira Lima	4	0	4	0	0	0
-	FW	(Romania) ROU	Valentin Badea	31	12	28+2	11	1	1
-	FW	(Moldova) MDA	Viorel Frunză	21	7	18+3	7	0	0
-	FW	(Nigeria) NGA	Gideon Ebijitimi	13	2	5+8	2	0	0
-	FW	(Romania) ROU	Filip Popescu	28	12	26+2	12	0	0
-	FW	(Romania) ROU	Tihamer Török	26	9	22+3	8	1	1
Players sold or loaned out during the season
-	GK	(Romania) ROU	Cristian Hăisan	2	2	1	1	1	1
-	DF	(Romania) ROU	Darius Badea	7	0	4+2	0	1	0
-	DF	(Romania) ROU	Dan Bichir	6	0	2+3	0	1	0
-	DF	(Romania) ROU	Andrei Parfenie	6	0	0+5	0	1	0
-	DF	(Romania) ROU	Petre Purda	15	2	14	1	1	1
-	MF	(Romania) ROU	Florin Berza	7	0	1+5	0	1	0
-	MF	(Romania) ROU	Emil Trăistaru	3	0	2+1	0	0	0

=== Top scorers ===
Position	Nation	Number	Name	Divizia B	Romanian Cup	Total
1	(Romania)	TBD	Filip Popescu	12	0	12
=	(Romania)	TBD	Valentin Badea	11	1	12
3	(Romania)	TBD	Tihamer Török	8	1	9
4	(Moldova)	TBD	Viorel Frunză	7	0	7
5	(Romania)	TBD	Sorin Frunză	3	0	3
6	(Nigeria)	TBD	Gideon Ebijitimi	2	0	2
=	(Romania)	TBD	Alin Pânzaru	1	1	2
=	(Romania)	TBD	Horaţiu Popa	1	1	2
=	(Romania)	TBD	Petre Purda	1	1	2
10	(Romania)	TBD	Florin Croitoru	1	0	1
=	(Romania)	TBD	Bogdan Panait	1	0	1
=	(Guinea)	TBD	Mbemba Sylla	1	0	1
=	(Romania)	TBD	Sorin Ungurianu	1	0	1
/	/	/	Own Goals	0	0	0
			TOTALS	50	5	55

=== Disciplinary record ===
Position	Nation	Number	Name	Divizia B		Romanian Cup		Total	
Position	Nation	Number	Name	Booked	Sent off (straight red)	Booked	Sent off (straight red)	Booked	Sent off (straight red)
DF	(Romania)	TBD	Emanuel Amarandei	4	0	0	0	4	0
FW	(Romania)	TBD	Valentin Badea	4	0	0	0	4	0
DF	(Romania)	TBD	Daniel Bălan	2	0	0	0	2	0
GK	(Romania)	TBD	Marius Bratu	1	0	0	0	1	0
FW	(Moldova)	TBD	Viorel Frunză	5	0	0	0	5	0
FW	(Nigeria)	TBD	Gideon Ebijitimi	1	0	0	0	1	0
GK	(Romania)	TBD	Gabriel Kajcsa	2	0	0	0	2	0
DF	(Romania)	TBD	Bogdan Panait	4	0	0	0	4	0
DF	(Romania)	TBD	Alin Pânzaru	1	0	0	0	1	0
FW	(Romania)	TBD	Florin Popescu	4	0	0	0	4	0
DF	(Romania)	TBD	Petre Purda	3	0	0	0	3	0
DF	(Romania)	TBD	Valentin Stancu	1	1	0	0	1	1
DF	(Romania)	TBD	Valentin Stancu	1	1	0	0	1	1
MF	(Guinea)	TBD	Mbemba Sylla	2	0	0	0	2	0
MF	(Romania)	TBD	Alexandru Nicolae	1	0	0	0	1	0
MF	(Brazil)	TBD	Nivaldo Vieira Lima	1	0	0	0	1	0
MF	(Romania)	TBD	Sorin Ungurianu	3	1	0	0	3	1
			TOTALS	39	2	0	0	39	2

== Divizia B ==
=== League table ===
Pos	Team	Pld	W	D	L	GF	GA	GD	Pts	Qualification
1	FC Vaslui (C, P)	30	19	7	4	50	20	+30	64	Promotion to Divizia A
2	Midia Năvodari	30	15	9	6	41	26	+15	54	
3	Dunărea Galați	30	15	7	8	39	33	+6	52	
4	Dacia Unirea Brăila	30	14	8	8	43	20	+23	50	
5	Ceahlăul Piatra Neamț	30	13	7	10	34	20	+14	46	

Updated to match(es) played on 30 June 2005. Source: romaniansoccer.ro (in Romanian)
Rules for classification: 1) Points; 2) Head-to-head points; 3) Head-to-head goal difference; 4) Head-to-head goals scored; 5) Head-to-head away goals scored; 6) Goal difference; 7) Goals scored.
(C) Champions; (P) Promoted

=== Results summary ===
Overall								Home						Away					
Pld	W	D	L	GF	GA	GD	Pts	W	D	L	GF	GA	GD	W	D	L	GF	GA	GD
30	19	7	4	50	20	+30	64	12	2	1	27	7	+20	7	5	3	23	13	+10

=== Results by round ===
Round	1	2	3	4	5	6	7	8	9	10	11	12	13	14	15	16	17	18	19	20	21	22	23	24	25	26	27	28	29	30
Ground	H	A	H	A	H	A	H	A	H	A	H	A	H	H	A	A	H	A	H	A	H	A	H	A	H	A	H	A	A	H
Result	W	D	W	L	D	W	W	D	W	D	W	D	W	W	W	L	W	W	W	W	D	D	W	W	W	W	L	W	L	W
Position	5	3	3	3	3	2	2	1	1	1	1	1	1	1	1	1	1	1	1	1	1	1	1	1	1	1	1	1	1	1

Updated to match(es) played on 11 June 2005. Source:
A = Away; H = Home; W = Win; D = Draw; L = Loss

=== Matches ===
2004-08-21

FC Vaslui	3 – 0	AS Midia Năvodari
Török 4'; S. Ungureanu 27'; V. Badea 36'	Report

Municipal, Vaslui
Attendance: 1,700
Referee: Cristian Sava

2004-08-28

FCM Târgoviște	1 – 1	FC Vaslui
V. Iordan 56' (pen)	Report	Török 52' (pen)

Eugen Popescu, Târgoviște
Attendance: 1,500
Referee: Sorin Burloiu

2004-09-04

FC Vaslui	1 – 0	Ceahlăul
F. Popescu 81'	Report

Municipal, Vaslui
Attendance: 7,000
Referee: Marius Martiş

2004-09-11

Precizia Săcele	2 – 1	FC Vaslui
G. Sala 20'; Kajcsaracs 64'	Report	Purda 63'

Electro-Precizia, Săcele
Attendance: 500
Referee: Sorin Colţescu

2004-09-18

FC Vaslui	0 – 0	Unirea Focşani
	Report

Municipal, Vaslui
Attendance: 3,000
Referee: Andrei Simion

2004-09-25

Petrolul Moineşti	1 – 2	FC Vaslui
Vasilachi 64'	Report	Török 2', 82'

Municipal, Moinești
Attendance: 600
Referee: Ionică Serea

2004-10-02

FC Vaslui	1 – 0	Laminorul Roman
F. Popescu 70'

Municipal, Vaslui
Attendance: 5,000
Referee: Adrian Comănescu

2004-10-09

FC Botoşani	1 – 1	FC Vaslui
M. Andrieş 6'	Report	V. Badea 16'

Municipal, Botoşani
Attendance: 1,200
Referee: Marian Salomir

2004-10-16

FC Vaslui	1 – 0	Dunărea Galaţi
Panait 84'	Report

Municipal, Vaslui
Attendance: 3,500
Referee: Cristian Sava

2004-10-23

Dacia Unirea Brăila	0 – 0	FC Vaslui
	Report

Municipal, Brăila
Attendance: 5,000
Referee: Augustus Constantin

2004-10-30

FC Vaslui	2 – 0	FC Ghimbav
V. Frunză 43'; V. Badea 92'	Report

Municipal, Vaslui
Attendance: 3,000
Referee: F. Marinescu

2004-11-06

Callatis Mangalia	1 – 1	FC Vaslui
Petrache 13'	Report	V. Badea 47'

Central, Mangalia
Attendance: 1,000
Referee: Tiberiu Lajos

2004-11-13

FC Vaslui	6 – 2	Poli Timișoara II
F. Popescu 11', 58'; V. Frunză 24', 39'; V. Badea 66', 68'	Report	D.Ioniţă 61'; Rădulescu 81'

Municipal, Vaslui
Attendance: 4,000
Referee: Sorin Burloiu

2004-11-20

FC Vaslui	1 – 0	Altay Constanţa
Török 34'	Report

Municipal, Vaslui
Attendance: 3,000
Referee: Adrian Comănescu

2004-11-27

Gloria Buzău	0 – 2	FC Vaslui
	Report	F. Popescu 62' (pen); V. Frunză 76'

Crâng, Buzău
Attendance: 1,000
Referee: Robert Dumitru

2005-03-12

AS Midia Năvodari	2 – 1	FC Vaslui
Curumi 5', 92'	Report	F. Popescu 35' (pen)

Petromidia, Năvodari
Attendance: 500
Referee: Sebastian Colţescu

2005-03-19

FC Vaslui	4 – 0	FCM Târgoviște
V. Badea 11'; F. Popescu 62' (pen); Pânzaru 77'; V. Frunză 87'	Report

Municipal, Vaslui
Attendance: 8,000
Referee: Vasile Păduraru

2005-03-26

Ceahlăul	0 – 1	FC Vaslui
	Report	V. Badea 13'

Ceahlăul, Piatra Neamţ
Attendance: 6,000
Referee: Ionică Serea

2005-04-02

FC Vaslui	1 – 0	Precizia Săcele
F. Popescu 42'	Report

Municipal, Vaslui
Attendance: 7,000
Referee: Florin Utzică

2005-04-09

Unirea Focşani	1 – 3	FC Vaslui
M. Covaci 9'	Report	Sylla 37'; F. Popescu 45'; S. Frunză 58'

Milcovul, Focşani
Attendance: 2,000
Referee: Lucian Dan

2005-04-16

FC Vaslui	1 – 1	Petrolul Moineşti
Ebijitimi 47'		Dragomirescu 82'

Municipal, Vaslui

2005-04-23

Laminorul Roman	1 – 1	FC Vaslui
Mavrichi 3'	Report	F. Popescu 12' (pen)

Moldova, Roman
Attendance: 1,500
Referee: Mihai Ianovschi

2005-04-29

FC Vaslui	1 – 0	FC Botoşani
Török 47'	Report

Municipal, Vaslui
Attendance: 3,000
Referee: C. Nicoară

2005-05-07

Dunărea Galaţi	0 – 3	FC Vaslui
	Report	Török 10'; F. Popescu 79' (pen); V. Frunză 90'

Dunărea, Galaţi
Attendance: 3,000
Referee: Victor Berbecaru

2005-05-11

FC Vaslui	2 – 1	Dacia Unirea Brăila
F. Croitoru 6'; Török 44'	Report	Gorga 64'

Municipal, Vaslui
Attendance: 12,000
Referee: V. Bratu

2005-05-14

FC Ghimbav	0 – 2	FC Vaslui
	Report	S. Frunză 18'; H. Popa 67'

Ghimbav
Attendance: 200
Referee: Adrian Stănescu

2005-05-21

FC Vaslui	0 – 1	Callatis Mangalia
	Report	Petrache 80'

Municipal, Vaslui
Attendance: 7,000
Referee: Andrei Ioniţă

2005-05-28

Poli Timișoara II	1 – 3	FC Vaslui
S. Mircea 70'	Report	V. Badea 11', 39'; S. Frunză 71'

RATT, Timișoara
Attendance: 100
Referee: Orlando Trandu

2005-06-04

Altay Constanţa	2 – 1	FC Vaslui
Ş. Ciobanu 8'; Mocanu 47' (pen)	Report	Ebijitimi 87'

Constanţa
Attendance: 200
Referee: V. Sandu

2005-06-11

FC Vaslui	3 – 2	Gloria Buzău
V. Frunză 2'; F. Popescu 29'; V. Badea 47'	Report	Muţiu 25'; Jaber 55'

Municipal, Huşi
Attendance: 3,000
Referee: Vasile Păduraru

== Cupa României ==
Kick-off listed in local time (EET)

=== Round 5 ===
2004-09-15
16:00

Dunărea Galaţi	0 – 5	FC Vaslui
		Pânzaru 53'; Purda 58'; H. Popa 59'; V. Badea 79'; Török 90'

Dunărea, Galaţi

=== Round 6 ===
2004-09-29
16:00

FC Botoşani	1 – 0	FC Vaslui
??? ??'

Municipal, Botoşani
