= 2003–04 FC Vaslui season =

FC Vaslui
2003–04 season
- Owner: (Romania) Adrian Porumboiu
- President: (Romania) Dragoş Iftime
- Manager: (Romania) Gigi Ion (Sacked on Dec 2003) (Romania) Gabriel Stan (Resigned from 30 Dec 2003, to 22 Mar 2004) (Romania) Adrian Matei (Resigned from Mar 2004 to 20 Apr 2004) (Romania) Ioan Sdrobiș (from 21 Apr 2004)
- Stadium: Municipal
- Divizia B: 2nd
- Cupa României: Round 5, eliminated
- Top goalscorer: League: (Romania) Florin Anghel (12) (Romania) Valentin Badea (12) (Romania) Sorin Frunză (12); All: (Romania) Florin Anghel (12) (Romania) Valentin Badea (12) (Romania) Sorin Frunză (12)
- Highest home attendance: 8,000 vs Petrolul Moineşti (30 November 2003)
- Lowest home attendance: 1,000 vs Gloria Buzău (14 April 2004); 1,000 vs Poiana Câmpina (26 May 2004)

The 2003–04 season was FC Vaslui's 2nd season of its existence, and its 1st in Divizia B. After Marius Stan, went to Poli Unirea Iaşi, the new president was Teofil Iordachi, but he resigned only after one week. Soon after, Dragoş Iftime was named the new president. Even if Adrian Porumboiu announced that he retires from sponsoring FC Vaslui, he still was helping the team in the new season. The new manager was named Gigi Ion, and the objective was to avoid relegation. FC Vaslui started the season with a victory against the archrival, Poli Unirea Iaşi 1-0. The team continued with some great performances, and so the objective, from avoiding relegation, changed to promote in Divizia A. In November, Gigi Ion had a conflict with the president, and after the 15th Matchday, he was dismissed, even the team finished 2nd. In the second part of the season, 3 managers trained the team, the last one Ioan Sdrobiş, staying until the end of the season. Also, Sdrobiş trained the team in the previous season, having some great performances. At the end of the season, FC Vaslui finished 2nd, with 12 points less than Poli Unirea Iaşi.

== Squad ==
As of 30 May 2004 Note: Flags indicate national team as defined under FIFA eligibility rules; some limited exceptions apply. Players may hold more than one non-FIFA nationality.

No.	Pos.	Nation	Player
-	GK	(Romania) ROU	Daniel Bogdan
-	GK	(Romania) ROU	Ionuț Irimia
-	GK	(Romania) ROU	Gabriel Kajcsa
-	DF	(Romania) ROU	Darius Badea
-	DF	(Romania) ROU	Cătălin Cazangiu
-	DF	(Romania) ROU	Norocel Chişereanu
-	DF	(Serbia and Montenegro) SCG	Milan Jovanović
-	DF	(Romania) ROU	Mihai Oancea
-	DF	(Romania) ROU	Bogdan Panait
-	DF	(Romania) ROU	Dinu Sânmărtean
-	MF	(Romania) ROU	Dumitru Botez

No.	Pos.	Nation	Player
-	MF	(Romania) ROU	Emil Bucur
-	MF	(Romania) ROU	Sorin Frunză
-	MF	(Romania) ROU	Constantin Ilie
-	MF	(Romania) ROU	Edward Iordănescu
-	MF	(Romania) ROU	Florin Pancovici
-	MF	(Romania) ROU	Eusebiu Tudor
-	MF	(Romania) ROU	Sorin Ungurianu
-	FW	(Romania) ROU	Florin Anghel
-	FW	(Romania) ROU	Valentin Badea
-	FW	(Moldova) MDA	Viorel Frunză
-	FW	(Romania) ROU	Florin Petcu

== Statistics ==
=== Appearances and goals ===
Last updated on 30 May 2004.

No.	Pos	Nat	Player	Total		Divizia B		Cupa României	
No.	Pos	Nat	Player	Apps	Goals	Apps	Goals	Apps	Goals
-	GK	(Romania) ROU	Daniel Bogdan	1	0	1	0	0	0
-	GK	(Romania) ROU	Ionuț Irimia	2	1	2	1	0	0
-	GK	(Romania) ROU	Gabriel Kajcsa	17	8	17	8	0	0
-	DF	(Romania) ROU	Darius Badea	26	1	24+2	1	0	0
-	DF	(Romania) ROU	Cătălin Cazangiu	4	0	3+1	0	0	0
-	DF	(Romania) ROU	Norocel Chişereanu	9	0	9	0	0	0
-	DF	(Serbia and Montenegro) SCG	Milan Jovanović	9	2	9	2	0	0
-	DF	(Romania) ROU	Mihai Oancea	11	1	7+4	1	0	0
-	DF	(Romania) ROU	Bogdan Panait	20	0	16+4	0	0	0
-	DF	(Romania) ROU	Dinu Sânmărtean	23	0	22+1	0	0	0
-	MF	(Romania) ROU	Dumitru Botez	1	0	1	0	0	0
-	MF	(Romania) ROU	Emil Bucur	17	1	11+6	1	0	0
-	MF	(Romania) ROU	Sorin Frunză	27	12	27	12	0	0
-	MF	(Romania) ROU	Constantin Ilie	9	0	7+2	0	0	0
-	MF	(Romania) ROU	Edward Iordănescu	8	0	5+3	0	0	0
-	MF	(Romania) ROU	Florin Pancovici	11	0	9+2	0	0	0
-	MF	(Romania) ROU	Eusebiu Tudor	12	0	12	0	0	0
-	MF	(Romania) ROU	Sorin Ungurianu	12	1	5+7	1	0	0
-	FW	(Romania) ROU	Florin Anghel	25	12	24+1	12	0	0
-	FW	(Romania) ROU	Valentin Badea	27	12	24+3	12	0	0
-	FW	(Moldova) MDA	Viorel Frunză	1	0	0+1	0	0	0
-	FW	(Romania) ROU	Florin Petcu	8	0	3+5	0	0	0
Players sold or loaned out during the season
-	GK	(Romania) ROU	Cristian Buturugă	9	6	9	6	0	0
-	DF	(Romania) ROU	Daniel Baciu	13	0	6+7	0	0	0
-	DF	(Romania) ROU	Fane Hărăianu	1	0	0+1	0	0	0
-	DF	(Romania) ROU	Alin Pânzaru	13	1	12+1	1	0	0
-	DF	(Romania) ROU	Cătălin Popa	4	1	3+1	1	0	0
-	DF	(Romania) ROU	Cristian Şoldan	5	0	0+5	0	0	0
-	MF	(Romania) ROU	Emanuel Amarandei	7	0	7	0	0	0
-	MF	(Romania) ROU	Romeo Buteseacă	10	0	10	0	0	0
-	MF	(Romania) ROU	Victor Cozma	3	0	0+3	0	0	0
-	MF	(Romania) ROU	Daniel Paica	9	0	7+2	0	0	0
-	FW	(Romania) ROU	Giani Căpuşă	14	2	5+9	2	0	0

=== Top scorers ===
Position	Nation	Number	Name	Divizia B	Romanian Cup	Total
1	(Romania)	TBD	Florin Anghel	12	0	12
=	(Romania)	TBD	Valentin Badea	12	0	12
=	(Romania)	TBD	Sorin Frunză	12	0	12
4	(Romania)	TBD	Giani Căpuşă	2	0	2
=	(Serbia and Montenegro)	TBD	Milan Jovanović	2	0	2
6	(Romania)	TBD	Darius Badea	1	0	1
=	(Romania)	TBD	Emil Bucur	1	0	1
=	(Romania)	TBD	Mihai Oancea	1	0	1
=	(Romania)	TBD	Alin Pânzaru	1	0	1
=	(Romania)	TBD	Cătălin Popa	1	0	1
=	(Romania)	TBD	Sorin Ungurianu	1	0	1
/	/	/	Own Goals	0	0	0
			TOTALS	46	0	46

=== Top assists ===
Position	Nation	Number	Name	Divizia B	Romanian Cup	Total
1	(Romania)	TBD	Sorin Frunză	9	0	9
2	(Romania)	TBD	Valentin Badea	2	0	2
=	(Romania)	TBD	Constantin Ilie	2	0	2
=	(Romania)	TBD	Florin Pancovici	2	0	2
5	(Romania)	TBD	Daniel Baciu	1	0	1
=	(Romania)	TBD	Emil Bucur	1	0	1
=	(Romania)	TBD	Dinu Sânmărtean	1	0	1
=	(Romania)	TBD	Eusebiu Tudor	1	0	1
=	(Romania)	TBD	Sorin Ungurianu	1	0	1
			TOTALS	20	0	20

=== Disciplinary record ===
Position	Nation	Number	Name	Divizia B		Romanian Cup		Total	
Position	Nation	Number	Name	Booked	Sent off (straight red)	Booked	Sent off (straight red)	Booked	Sent off (straight red)
FW	(Romania)	TBD	Florin Anghel	3	0	0	0	3	0
DF	(Romania)	TBD	Daniel Baciu	1	0	0	0	1	0
DF	(Romania)	TBD	Darius Badea	5	0	0	0	5	0
FW	(Romania)	TBD	Valentin Badea	4	1	0	0	4	1
MF	(Romania)	TBD	Emil Bucur	3	1	0	0	3	1
MF	(Romania)	TBD	Romeo Buteseacă	1	0	0	0	1	0
FW	(Romania)	TBD	Giani Căpuşă	2	0	0	0	2	0
DF	(Romania)	TBD	Cătălin Cazangiu	1	0	0	0	1	0
MF	(Romania)	TBD	Sorin Frunză	5	0	0	0	5	0
MF	(Romania)	TBD	Constantin Ilie	1	0	0	0	1	0
MF	(Romania)	TBD	Edward Iordănescu	2	0	0	0	2	0
DF	(Serbia and Montenegro)	TBD	Milan Jovanović	2	0	0	0	2	0
GK	(Romania)	TBD	Gabriel Kajcsa	1	0	0	0	1	0
MF	(Romania)	TBD	Daniel Paica	1	0	0	0	1	0
DF	(Romania)	TBD	Bogdan Panait	3	0	0	0	3	0
DF	(Romania)	TBD	Florin Pancovici	1	0	0	0	1	0
DF	(Romania)	TBD	Cătălin Popa	1	0	0	0	1	0
DF	(Romania)	TBD	Dinu Sânmărtean	5	2	0	0	5	2
DF	(Romania)	TBD	Sorin Ungurianu	1	0	0	0	1	0
			TOTALS	43	4	0	0	43	4

== Divizia B ==
=== League table ===
Pos	Team	Pld	W	D	L	GF	GA	GD	Pts	Qualification
1	Politehnica Iași (C, P)	30	21	7	2	61	20	+41	70	Promotion to Divizia A
2	FC Vaslui	30	18	4	8	52	21	+31	58	
3	Dacia Unirea Brăila	30	15	6	9	47	34	+13	51	
4	Petrolul Moinești	30	15	4	11	43	34	+9	49	
5	Laminorul Roman	30	14	4	12	39	35	+4	46	

Updated to match(es) played on 30 June 2004. Source: romaniansoccer.ro (in Romanian)
Rules for classification: 1) Points; 2) Head-to-head points; 3) Head-to-head goal difference; 4) Head-to-head goals scored; 5) Head-to-head away goals scored; 6) Goal difference; 7) Goals scored.
(C) Champions; (P) Promoted

=== Results by round ===
Round	1	2	3	4	5	6	7	8	9	10	11	12	13	14	15	16	17	18	19	20	21	22	23	24	25	26	27	28	29	30
Ground	H	A	H	A	H	A	H	A	H	A	H	A	H	A	H	A	H	A	H	A	H	A	H	A	H	A	H	A	H	A
Result	W	D	L	D	W	W	W	L	W	L	W	D	W	W	W	L	W	W	L	D	W	L	W	W	W	L	W	L	W	W
Position	5	4	9	9	7	3	3	5	4	4	4	4	4	4	2	2	2	2	3	2	2	2	2	2	2	2	2	2	2	2

Updated to match(es) played on 30 May 2004. Source:
A = Away; H = Home; W = Win; D = Draw; L = Loss

=== Results summary ===
Overall								Home						Away					
Pld	W	D	L	GF	GA	GD	Pts	W	D	L	GF	GA	GD	W	D	L	GF	GA	GD
30	18	4	8	50	21	+29	58	13	0	2	29	8	+21	5	4	6	21	13	+8

=== Matches ===
23 August 2002 Matchday 1	Vaslui	1 – 0	Poli Unirea Iaşi	Vaslui
11:00 EET	Frunză 92' (pen.)	Report		Stadium: Municipal; Attendance: 7 000; Referee: Emilian Ciurus

30 August 2002 Matchday 2	Unirea Focşani	0 – 0	Vaslui	Bacău
11:00 EET		Report		Stadium: Municipal; Attendance: 1 000; Referee: Alexandru Bajan

6 September 2002 Matchday 3	Vaslui	1 – 2	Oneşti	Vaslui
11:00 EET	Frunză 37'	Report	Gorga 9'; Bârsan 24'	Stadium: Municipal; Attendance: 4 000; Referee: Sorin Burloiu

13 September 2002 Matchday 4	Midia Năvodari	1 – 1	Vaslui	Bacău
11:00 EET	Agafiţei 16'	Report	Anghel 83'	Stadium: Municipal; Attendance: 100; Referee: Robert Dumitru

20 September 2002 Matchday 5	Vaslui	1 – 0	Callatis Mangalia	Vaslui
11:00 EET	Anghel 59'	Report		Stadium: Municipal; Attendance: 3 500; Referee: Mugurel Vădan

27 September 2002 Matchday 6	Gloria Buzău	0 – 4	Vaslui	Buzău
11:00 EET		Report	Badea 18', 89'; Frunză 63', 68' (pen.)	Stadium: Municipal; Attendance: 200; Referee: R. Rusu

4 October 2002 Matchday 7	Vaslui	5 – 0	Metalul Plopeni	Vaslui
11:00 EET	Bucur 5'; Anghel 27', 88'; Căpuşă 80', 86'	Report		Stadium: Municipal; Attendance: 3 500; Referee: Cristian Sava

11 October 2002 Matchday 8	Medgidia	2 – 1	Vaslui	Medgidia
11:00 EET	Bardu 59'; Ţeican 74'	Report	Badea 42'	Stadium: Iftimie Ilisei; Attendance: 200; Referee: A. Simion

18 October 2002 Matchday 9	Vaslui	1 – 0	Oltul Sfântu-Gheorghe	Vaslui
11:00 EET	Frunză 67'	Report		Stadium: Municipal; Attendance: 2 000; Referee: Marian Lazăr

25 October 2002 Matchday 10	Laminorul Roman	2 – 1	Vaslui	Roman
11:00 EET	Baciu 3' (o.g.); Beceru 85'	Report	Oancia 72'	Stadium: Moldova; Attendance: 2 500; Referee: Victor Berbecaru

#	Kick Off	Opponents	H / A	Result	Scorers	Referee	Attendance	Position	Report
11	2003-11-01 11:00	Precizia Săcele	H	2-0	S. Frunză (2)			4th	
12	2003-11-08 11:00	Electrica Constanţa	A	0-0		Marian Vădan	100	4th	Report
13	2003-11-15 11:00	Dacia Unirea Brăila	H	1-0	C. Popa 78'	Robert Ghioane	6,000	4th	Report
14	2003-11-22 11:00	Poiana Câmpina	A	2-0	F. Anghel 14', V. Badea 40'	Sebastian Colţescu	200	4th	Report
15	2003-11-29 11:00	Petrolul Moineşti	H	1-0	Pânzaru 58'	Codruţ Nicoară	8,000	2nd	Report
16	2004-03-14 11:00	Poli Unirea Iaşi	A	1-3	F. Anghel 49'	Cristian Balaj	16,000	2nd	Report
17	2004-03-21 11:00	Unirea Focşani	H	2-1	M. Jovanović 10', F. Anghel 52'		6,000	2nd	Report
18	2004-03-28	FC Oneşti	A	3-0 (forfeit)	FC Oneşti retired from the championship			2nd	
19	2004-04-03 11:00	AS Midia Năvodari	H	0-1			3,500	3rd	Report
20	2004-04-10 11:00	Callatis Mangalia	A	0-0		Mugurel Drăgănescu	800	2nd	Report
21	2004-04-14 11:00	Gloria Buzău	H	4-0	M. Jovanović 1', F. Anghel 78', 81', 89'	Zoltan Erdei	1,000	2nd	Report
22	2004-04-17 11:00	Metalul Plopeni	A	0-1		Sebastian Colţescu	700	2nd	Report
23	2004-04-24 11:00	CSM Medgidia	H	4-1	V. Badea 5', 19', S. Frunză 10', 60' (pen)	G. Gherman	3,000	2nd	Report
24	2004-05-01 11:00	Oltul Sfântu-Gheorghe	A	2-0	S. Frunză (2)			2nd	
25	2004-05-08 11:00	Laminorul Roman	H	3-2	F. Anghel 14', V. Badea 22', S. Ungurianu 28'	Vasile Lungu	6,000	2nd	Report
26	2004-05-12 11:00	Precizia Săcele	A	0-1		Marian Vădan	500	2nd	Report
27	2004-05-15 11:00	Electrica Constanţa	H	1-0	D. Badea			2nd	Report
28	2004-05-22 11:00	Dacia Unirea Brăila	A	1-2	V. Badea 3'	Radu Dumitru	2,000	2nd	Report
29	2004-05-26 11:00	Poiana Câmpina	H	2-1	F. Anghel 23', S. Frunză 39'	M. Bordean	1,000	2nd	Report
30	2004-05-30 11:00	Petrolul Moineşti	A	5-1	V. Badea 21', 50', 52', 67', Parpalea 87'	Sebastian Colţescu	400	2nd	Report

== Cupa României ==
Round	Kick Off	Opponents	H / A	Result	Scorers	Referee	Attendance
R4	2003-09-10 16:00	FC Oneşti	H				
R5	2003-09-23 16:00	Dunărea Galaţi	H	1–2			
