= List of FC Vaslui records and statistics =

This is a list of statistics and records of the Romanian professional football club FC Vaslui. It is based in Vaslui, Romania, and currently plays in Liga IV. The club was founded in 2002 and its home ground is the Municipal Stadium.

== Honours ==
FC Vaslui succeeded three league runners-up, two in the lower divisions and one in Liga I in the 2011–12 season. In 2010, Vaslui reached the Romanian Cup final, lost at the penalty shootout. Vaslui's highest European performance is winning the UEFA Intertoto Cup in 2008.

=== Domestic ===
Liga I:

- Runner-up (1): 2011–12

Liga II:

- Winners (1): 2004–05
- Runner-up (1): 2003–04

Liga III:

- Runner-up (1): 2002–03

Romanian Cup:

- Runner-up (1): 2009–10

=== European ===
UEFA Intertoto Cup:

- Winners (1): 2008

== Player records ==
=== Appearances ===
Mike Temwanjera holds FC Vaslui's appearance record, having played 201 times over the course of 6 seasons from 2007 until now. He also holds the records for most European appearances, having made 17, but also the record for the most league appearances, with 173. Also, Wesley Lopes holds Romanian Cup appearances, with 14.

- Most appearances in all competitions: Mike Temwanjera, 202.
- Most league appearances: Mike Temwanjera, 174.
- Most Romanian Cup appearances: Wesley Lopes, 14.
- Most European appearances: Mike Temwanjera 17.
- Youngest first-team player: Rareș Lazăr, 15 years and 47 days (against Ceahlăul Piatra Neamţ, 17 May 2014).
- Oldest first-team player: Dorinel Munteanu, 39 years and 158 days (against Rapid București, 1 December 2007).
- Oldest debutant: Dorinel Munteanu, 39 years and 32 days (against UTA Arad, 27 July 2007).
- Most consecutive league appearances: Cristian Hăisan, 59 (from 30 September 2006 to 7 May 2007).
- Most seasons as an ever-present: Bogdan Buhuş, 5 (from 2005–06 to 2009–10).
- Longest-serving player: Cristian Hăisan, 8 years (from 2002 to 2010).

=== Most appearances ===
#	Name	Years	League	Cupa României	Europe	Total
1	(Zimbabwe) Mike Temwanjera	2007–2014	174	11	17	202
2	(Romania) Lucian Sânmărtean	2010–2013	121	12	16	149
3	(Romania) Bogdan Buhuş	2005–2010	125	10	9	144
4	(Brazil) Wesley	2009–2012	113	14	12	139
5	(Romania) Adrian Gheorghiu	2006–2012	111	12	6	129
6	(Bulgaria) Zhivko Milanov	2010–2013	104	7	15	126
7	(Romania) Raul Costin	2009–2013	101	11	12	124
8	(Romania) Vasile Buhăescu	2008–2013	104	9	10	123
9	(Romania) Sorin Frunză	2002–2008	114	6	0	120
10	(Romania) Bogdan Panait	2003–2010	104	4	3	111

=== Most appearances in Liga I ===
#	Name	Years	League	Goals
1	(Zimbabwe) Mike Temwanjera	2007–2014	174	39
2	(Romania) Bogdan Buhuş	2005–2010	125	0
3	(Romania) Lucian Sânmărtean	2010–2013	121	12
4	(Brazil) Wesley Lopes	2009–2012	113	61
5	(Romania) Adrian Gheorghiu	2006–2012	111	9
6	(Romania) Vasile Buhăescu	2005–2013	104	7
7	(Bulgaria) Zhivko Milanov	2010–2013	104	1
8	(Romania) Raul Costin	2009–2013	101	5
9	(Serbia) Marko Ljubinković	2006–2010	94	24
10	(Slovakia) Dušan Kuciak	2008–2011	87	0

=== Goalscorers ===
FC Vaslui's all-time leading scorer is Wesley Lopes, who scored 77 goals between 2009 until 2012. He also holds the record for most league goals with 61, for the most goals in European competition with 6, for the most goals in Romanian Cup with 10, but also the record for the most goals in a season with 37 in all competitions in the 2011–12 season.

- Most goals in all competitions: Wesley Lopes, 77.
- Most league goals: Wesley Lopes, 61.
- Most Romanian Cup goals: Wesley Lopes, 10.
- Most European goals: Wesley Lopes, 6.
- Most goals in a season: Wesley Lopes, 37 (during the 2011–12 season).
- Most hat-tricks in a season: Wesley Lopes, 3 (during the 2011–12 season).
- Most hat-tricks: Wesley Lopes, 4.
- Fastest hat-trick: Cătălin Andruş, 5 minutes (against CFR Paşcani, 12 October 2002).
- Most consecutive league goals scored at Municipal: Marko Ljubinković, 5 during the 2007–08 season.
- Highest-scoring substitute: Valentin Badea, 3.
- Most penalties scored: Wesley Lopes, 15.
- Most games without scoring for an outfield player: Bogdan Buhuş, 125.
- Youngest goalscorer: Sorin Ungurianu, 18 years, 328 days (against Laminorul Roman, 8 May 2004).
- Oldest goalscorer: Adaílton, 35 years, 104 days (against Gaz Metan Mediaş, 7 May 2012).

=== Top goalscorers ===
#	Name	Years	League	Cupa României	Europe	Total
1	(Brazil) Wesley Lopes	2009–2012	61	10	6	77
2	(Zimbabwe) Mike Temwanjera	2007–2014	39	5	5	49
3	(Romania) Valentin Badea	2002–2006	42	1	0	43
4	(Romania) Sorin Frunză	2002–2008	35	2	0	37
5	(Serbia) Marko Ljubinković	2006–2010	24	0	0	24
6	(Romania) Liviu Antal	2012–2014	20	1	1	22
7	(Brazil) Adaílton	2010–2012	17	2	0	19
8	(Moldova) Viorel Frunză	2004–2006	17	0	0	17
8	(Romania) Lucian Burdujan	2008–2010	10	4	3	17
10	(Poland) Piotr Celeban	2012–2014	11	2	0	13

=== Top goalscorers in Liga I ===
#	Name	Years	Goals	Appearances
1	(Brazil) Wesley	2009–2012	61	113
2	(Zimbabwe) Mike Temwanjera	2007–2014	39	174
3	(Serbia) Marko Ljubinković	2006–2010	24	94
4	(Romania) Liviu Antal	2012–2014	21	63
5	(Brazil) Adaílton	2010–2012	17	59
6	(Romania) Marius Niculae	2012–2013	11	18
6	(Poland) Piotr Celeban	2012–2014	11	55
6	(Romania) Lucian Sânmărtean	2010–2013	11	121
9	(Moldova) Viorel Frunză	2004–2007	10	22
9	(Romania) Lucian Burdujan	2008–2010	10	54

=== Historical goals ===
==== In Liga I ====
Goal	Name	Date	Match	Score
1st	(Romania) Valentin Badea	13 August 2005	Gloria Bistriţa 1–1 Vaslui	0–1
100th	(Serbia) Marko Ljubinković	13 April 2008	Farul Constanţa 2–1 Vaslui	2–1
200th	(Brazil) Adaílton	25 September 2010	Vaslui 1–0 Gloria Bistriţa	1–0
300th	(Bulgaria) Zhivko Milanov	18 August 2012	Gloria Bistriţa 0–3 Vaslui	0–1

==== All-time ====
Goal	Name	Date	Competition	Match	Score
1st	(Romania) Emanuel Amarandei	31 August 2002	Divizia C	Viitorul Hârlău 1–3 Vaslui	0–1
100th	(Romania) Valentin Badea	22 November 2003	Divizia B	Vaslui 2–0 Poiana Câmpina	2–0
200th	(Romania) Sebastian Sfârlea	30 April 2006	Divizia A	Oţelul Galaţi 1–1 Vaslui	0–1
300th	(Romania) Lucian Burdujan	28 August 2008	UEFA Cup	Vaslui 3–1 Metalurg Liepājas	1–0
400th	(Serbia) Nemanja Milisavljević	20 April 2010	Liga I	Internaţional 1–2 Vaslui	1–2
500th	(Brazil) Adaílton	20 December 2011	Liga I	Vaslui 2–3 Rapid București	2–2
600th	(Romania) Liviu Antal	29 October 2013	Romanian Cup	Vaslui 4–1 Botoșani	4–1

=== Most captained ===
#	Name	Years	League	Cupa României	Europe	Total
1	(Brazil) Wesley Lopes	2009–2012	55	7	7	69
2	(Romania) Bogdan Buhuş	2005–2010	50	4	9	63
3	(Romania) Gabriel Cânu	2008–2013	35	4	1	40
4	(Romania) Sorin Frunză	2002–2008	31	1	0	32
5	(Romania) Lucian Sânmărtean	2010–2013	28	2	1	31

=== International ===
- First capped player: Viorel Frunză, for Moldova on 7 October 2006.
- Most international caps while a FC Vaslui player: Denis Zmeu, 20 for Moldova.
- Most international goals while a FC Vaslui player: Denis Zmeu, 1 for Moldova
- First international participating at a WC: Dušan Kuciak, with Slovakia at 2010 FIFA World Cup.
- First international playing at a CAN: Fernando Varela, with Cape Verde at 2013 Africa Cup of Nations.

=== Transfers ===
==== Record transfer fees paid ====
Record transfer fees paid by Vaslui FC
No.	Fee	Paid to	For	Date	Ref
1	€1,500,000	(Portugal) Leixões S.C.	(Brazil) Wesley	1 February 2009	
2	€950,000	(Romania) Farul Constanţa	(Brazil) Gerlem	1 July 2009	
3	€800,000	(Slovakia) MŠK Žilina	(Slovakia) Dušan Kuciak	1 July 2008	
4	€700,000	(Portugal) Olhanense	(Brazil) Cauê	1 July 2012	
5	€600,000	(Portugal) Académica de Coimbra	(Senegal) Ousmane N'Doye	1 February 2008	

==== Record transfer fees received ====
Record transfer fees received by Vaslui FC
No.	Fee	Received from	For	Date	Ref
1	€2,000,000	(Saudi Arabia) Al-Hilal	(Brazil) Wesley	26 July 2012	
2	€1,750,000	(Italy) Chievo Verona	(Romania) Paul Papp	31 May 2012	
3	€1,240,000	(Romania) Steaua București	(Cape Verde) Fernando Varela	2 September 2013	
4	€1,000,000	(Romania) Steaua București	(Romania) Valentin Badea	1 July 2006	
5	€700,000	(Romania) Steaua București	(Romania) Nicolae Stanciu	1 July 2013	

== Managerial records ==
- First manager: Ioan Sdrobiş, from 20 July 2002 to 1 December 2002.
- Longest-serving manager by matches: Viorel Hizo managed the club for 96 matches over a period of 2 years and 329 days.

=== Managerial history ===
#	Name	Years	Matches	Record	Win Rate
1.	Ioan Sdrobiș	20 July 2002 – 1 December 2002; 21 April 2004 – 22 November 2004	35	25–5–5	71.4%
2.	Ion Balaur	3 February 2003 – 3 July 2003	14	9–2–3	64.3%
3.	Gigi Ion	17 July 2003 – December 2003	15	9–2–4	60%
4.	Gabriel Stan	30 December 2003 – 22 March 2004	2	1–0–1	50%
5.	Adrian Matei	March 2004 – 20 April 2004	4	1–1–2	25%
6.	Mircea Rednic	15 January 2005 – 11 June 2005; 11 September 2005 – 7 June 2006	40	16–2–12	40.0%
7.	Basarab Panduru	16 June 2005 – 10 September 2005	5	0–1–4	0%
8.	Gheorghe Mulţescu	5 July 2006 – 24 September 2006	9	1–2–6	11.1%
9.	Viorel Hizo	24 September 2006 – 23 May 2007; 10 June 2008 – 1 November 2008; 7 October 2010 – 27 January 2012; 28 September 2012 – 8 April 2013	96	47–26–23	48.9%
10.	Dorinel Munteanu	11 June 2007 – 31 March 2008	26	11–9–6	42.3%
11.	Emil Săndoi	1 April 2008 – 7 May 2008	8	1–2–5	12.5%
12.	Viorel Moldovan	1 November 2008 – 26 May 2009	19	10–4–5	52.6%
13.	Cristian Dulca	26 May 2009 – 21 September 2009	9	5–1–3	55.6%
14.	Marius Lăcătuş	28 September 2009 – 27 May 2010	26	15–7–4	57.7%
15.	(Spain) López Caro	16 June 2010 – 7 October 2010	10	4–3–3	40%
16.	(Portugal) Augusto Inácio	29 January 2012 – 4 July 2012	16	13–1–2	81.25%
17.	Marius Șumudică	5 July 2012 – 24 September 2012	9	4–3–2	44.4%
18.	Gavril Balint	9 April 2013 – 16 June 2013	8	5–3–1	62.5%
19.	Ilie Stan	20 June 2013 – 2 August 2013	1	0–0–1	0%
20.	Ionuț Moșteanu	2 August 2013 – 6 October 2013	8	3–2–3	37.5%
21.	Liviu Ciobotariu	8 October 2013 – 24 April 2014	19	10–4–5	52.6%
22.	Costinel Botez	24 April 2014 – 19 May 2014	6	1–0–5	16.6%

== Statistics in Liga I ==
Opponent	Pld	W	D	L	GD	Pld	W	D	L	GD	Pld	W	D	L	GD
Argeş	6	2	2	2	5:3	3	2	0	1	4:1	3	0	2	1	1:2
Astra	8	3	4	1	9:6	4	3	1	0	7:3	4	0	3	1	2:3
Bacău	2	1	1	0	3:1	1	0	1	0	1:1	1	1	0	0	2:0
Braşov	10	2	5	3	10:11	5	1	2	2	5:6	5	1	3	1	5:5
Ceahlăul	10	6	1	3	18:12	5	3	0	2	9:8	5	3	1	1	9:5
Concordia	4	3	1	0	11:1	2	2	0	0	7:0	2	1	1	0	4:1
CFR Cluj	16	3	5	8	12:23	8	3	3	2	10:10	8	0	2	7	2:13
Dinamo	16	10	2	4	26:16	8	5	0	3	16:9	8	5	2	1	10:7
Farul	8	1	2	5	9:14	4	1	1	2	6:8	4	0	1	3	3:6
Gloria Bistriţa	14	8	4	2	21:10	7	5	1	1	10:4	7	3	3	1	11:6
Gloria Buzău	4	2	1	1	9:6	2	2	0	0	7:1	2	0	1	1	2:5
Inter	2	2	0	0	3:1	1	1	0	0	1:0	1	1	0	0	2:1
Jiul	4	2	1	1	6:3	2	1	0	1	3:2	2	1	1	0	3:1
Mediaş	10	4	5	1	14:6	5	3	2	0	11:3	5	1	3	1	3:3
Mioveni	4	3	1	0	13:2	2	2	0	0	6:0	2	1	1	0	7:2
Naţional	4	3	1	0	3:0	2	1	1	0	1:0	2	2	0	0	2:0
Otopeni	2	2	0	0	4:0	1	1	0	0	2:0	1	1	0	0	2:0
Oţelul	16	9	4	3	21:9	8	6	2	0	14:3	8	3	2	3	7:7
Pandurii	16	10	3	3	20:12	8	7	1	0	13:5	8	3	2	3	7:7
Poli Iaşi	12	7	3	2	18:9	6	3	3	0	9:3	6	4	0	2	9:6
Rapid	16	3	5	8	17:27	8	3	2	3	9:10	8	0	3	5	8:17
Sportul	6	3	0	3	6:9	3	2	0	1	5:5	3	1	0	2	1:4
Steaua	16	5	4	7	14:21	8	4	1	3	7:10	8	1	3	4	7:11
Târgu Mureş	4	3	1	0	10:3	2	1	1	0	5:1	2	2	0	0	5:2
Timişoara	12	4	3	5	16:17	6	3	2	1	10:6	6	1	1	4	6:11
U Cluj	8	5	2	1	10:5	4	3	1	0	4:0	4	2	1	1	6:5
U Craiova	10	5	3	2	13:9	5	2	2	1	7:5	5	3	1	1	5:3
Unirea Alba Iulia	2	1	0	1	3:2	1	1	0	0	3:0	1	0	0	1	0:2
Unirea Urziceni	10	2	3	5	7:10	5	1	3	1	4:4	5	1	0	4	3:7
UTA	4	1	2	1	6:8	2	0	1	1	4:7	2	1	1	0	2:1
Victoria Brăneşti	2	2	0	0	4:1	1	1	0	0	1:0	1	1	0	0	3:1
Voinţa Sibiu	2	1	0	1	2:3	1	1	0	0	2:0	1	0	0	1	0:3

== Club records ==
=== Matches ===
==== Firsts ====
- First match: Vaslui 1–1 Poli Unirea Iaşi, a friendly match, 10 August 2002.
- First Football League match: Viitorul Hârlău 1–3 Vaslui, Divizia C, 31 August 2002.
- First Romanian Cup match: Vaslui 4–0 FCM CFR Paşcani, 3rd round, 11 September 2002.
- First European match: Neftchi Baku 2–1 Vaslui, Intertoto Uefa Cup, 3rd round, 19 July 2008.

==== Wins ====
- Record league win: 9–0 against Ceahlăul Piatra Neamţ II in Divizia C, 3 May 2003.
- Record European Cup win: 3–1 against Liepājas Metalurgs, 28 August 2008.
- Most league wins in a season: 22 wins out of 34 games (during the 2011–12 season).
- Fewest league wins in a season: 6 wins out of 30 games (during the 2005–06 season).

==== Defeats ====
- Record defeat: 0–4 against Steaua București in Divizia A, 7 June 2006.
- Record defeat at Municipal: 0–4 against Steaua București in Divizia A, 7 June 2006.
- Most league defeats in a season: 13 defeats out of 30 games (during the 2005–06 season).
- Fewest defeats in a season: 4 defeats out of 30 games 2004–05 season.

=== Goals ===
- Most league goals scored in a season: 76 in 28 games (during the 2002–03 season, Divizia C).
- Fewest league goals scored in a season: 23 in 30 games (during the 2005–06 season, Divizia A).
- Most league goals conceded in a season: 44 in 34 games (during the 2006–07 season, Liga I).
- Fewest league goals conceded in a season: 15 in 28 games (during the 2002–03 season, Divizia C).

=== Points ===
- Most points in a season: Three points for a win: 70 (in 34 games in 2011–12, Liga I).
- Fewest points in a season::Three points for a win: 29 (in 30 games in 2005–06, Divizia A).

=== Attendances ===
- Highest league attendance: 12,000 (against Steaua București, Divizia A in the 2005–06 season).
- Highest Romanian Cup attendance: 7,000 (against FC Brașov, in the 2009–10 season).
- Highest European attendance: 9,000 (against AEK Athens, in the 2009–10 season).
- Record lowest attendance: 1,000 (against Gloria Buzău, Divizia B in the 2003–04 season).
- Lowest European attendance: 5,000 (against Neftchi Baku in the 2008–09 season).

== European record ==
Notes for the abbreviations in the tables below:

- 1R: First round
- 3R: Third round
- 2QR: Second qualifying round
- 3QR: Third qualifying round
- PO: Play-off round

Season	Competition	Round	Club	Home	Away	Aggregate
2008–09	UEFA Intertoto Cup	3R	(Azerbaijan) Neftçi	2–0	1–2	3–2
2008–09	UEFA Cup	2QR	(Latvia) Liepājas Metalurgs	3–1	2–0	5–1
2008–09	UEFA Cup	1R	(Czech Republic) Slavia Prague	1–1	0–0	1–1 (a)
2009–10	Europa League	3QR	(Cyprus) Omonia	2–0	1–1	3–1
2009–10	Europa League	PO	(Greece) AEK Athens	2–1	0–3	2–4
2010–11	Europa League	PO	(France) Lille	0–0	0–2	0–2
2011–12	Champions League	3QR	(Netherlands) Twente	0–0	0–2	0–2
2011–12	Europa League	PO	(Czech Republic) Sparta Prague	2–0	0–1	2–1
2011–12	Europa League	Group stage	(Portugal) Sporting CP	1–0	0–2	3rd
2011–12	Europa League	Group stage	(Italy) Lazio	0–0	2–2	3rd
2011–12	Europa League	Group stage	(Switzerland) Zürich	2–2	0–2	3rd
2012–13	Champions League	3QR	(Turkey) Fenerbahçe	1–4	1–1	2–5
2012–13	Europa League	PO	(Italy) Internazionale	0–2	2–2	2–4
