= 2002–03 FC Vaslui season =

FC Vaslui
2002–03 season
- Owner: (Romania) Adrian Porumboiu
- President: (Romania) Marius Stan
- Manager: (Romania) Ioan Sdrobiş (Sacked on 1 Dec 2002) (Romania) Ion Balaur (From 3 Feb 2003)
- Stadium: Municipal
- Divizia C: 2nd
- Cupa României: Round 4, eliminated
- Top goalscorer: League: (Romania) Sorin Frunză (16); All: (Romania) Sorin Frunză (18)

The 2002–03 season was the first season in the history of Vaslui. In what was their inaugural season as a professional club, Victoria Galaţi moved to Vaslui after an agreement between Marius Stan and the Vaslui Municipality to use the Municipal Stadium. The team also changed the colour of its kit, wearing yellow and green striped jerseys for the first time.

Vaslui reached the fourth round of the Romanian Cup, defeating CFR Paşcani at home, before losing to Divizia B side Unirea Focşani. During their inaugural season, Vaslui enjoyed an unbeaten run at home in the league that lasted until 29 March 2003, when Vaslui were beaten by Petrolul Moineşti. Vaslui ended the campaign on 65 points, with a record of 21 wins, 2 draws and 5 losses, and finished as runners-up to Petrolul Moineşti in the league table, which meant the club was promoted to Divizia B. Sorin Frunză was the club's top goalscorer, recording 18 goals, 16 in the league and two in the Romanian Cup.

== Background ==
In July 2002, following the promotion of Victoria Galaţi in Divizia C, president Marius Stan decided to move his team to Vaslui. Set to play in Serie II under the name "Fotbal Club Municipal Vaslui", they ended up playing in Serie I following the withdrawal of Pro Mobila Crucea. Former Jiul Petroşani manager Ioan Sdrobiş was appointed as Vaslui's first manager on 23 July. On 1 August, Vaslui City Council agreed to grant FC Vaslui a 25-year lease of the Municipal Stadium. Unlike Sportul Municipal Vaslui who was left for disaffiliation, FC Vaslui was supported by the city council and businessman Adrian Porumboiu.

== Season overview ==
=== August–September ===
With a team assembled over the summer months, Vaslui played their first ever fixture against Poli Unirea Iaşi on 10 August 2002, a game which ended 1–1. The pioneering team consisted of Cristian Brăneț in goal, defenders Cătălin Popa, Sorin Haraga, Cătălin Andruş and Robert Stamate, midfielders Adrian Popa, Emil Trăistariu, Sorin Sava and Sorin Frunză, with Flavius Hâdă and Valentin Badea in attack, while Dumitran, Marcel Atănăsoaiei, Alin Pânzaru, Emanuel Amarandei and Radu Ciobanu were substituted in during the game. Poli Unirea Iaşi scored first through Cătălin Abălaşei in the 30th minute, while Vaslui equalized in the 82nd minute through Dumitran. The club arranged five more friendlies during their training camp in Huşi against FC Oneşti, Petrolul Moineşti, Rafinăria Dărmăneşti, FC Târgu Ocna and Letea Bacău over the course of five days.

Vaslui's first league game was at Gheorghe Costache Stadium against Viitorul Hârlău on 31 August 2002. Vaslui won 3–1 with Amarandei scoring the club's first ever league goal. One week later, Vaslui hosted their first home game at Municipal against Letea Bacău. Flavius Hâdă scored the first goal at Municipal in the 5th minute, while Adrian Popa closed the scoreboard with a late goal, providing Vaslui's first home win. In the following match, Vaslui lost for the first time, against Petrolul Moineşti with Adrian Popa scoring for the second successive league match and Valentin Badea adding one further goal. On 21 September, Vaslui hosted CFR Moldova Iaşi at Municipal; Sorin Frunză scored his first two league goals of the season in a 3–1 win. They ended September level on points with two other clubs, in second place on goal average.

=== October ===
On 5 October, Cătălin Andruş scored Vaslui's first ever hat-trick during a five-minute stretch, as Vaslui registered a 7–0 home victory over CFR Paşcani. The club's excellent form continued in their next away match at Cimentul Bicaz, as they gained their third straight win. Another 4–0 win, against Unirea Negreşti, was followed by a comprehensive 9–0 away victory against Ceahlăul Piatra Neamţ II.

== Transfers ==
=== Transfers in ===
Position	Player	Transferred from	Fee	Date
MF	(Romania) Neculai Alin	(Romania) Unirea Negreşti	Signed	Summer
MF	(Romania) Emanuel Amarandei	(Romania) Dunărea Galaţi	Signed	Summer
DF	(Romania) Cătălin Andruş	(Romania) Unirea Negreşti	Signed	Summer
DF	(Romania) Bogdan Anghelinei	(Romania) Dunărea Galaţi	Signed	Summer
MF	(Romania) Marcel Atănăsoaie	(Romania) Dacia Unirea Brăila	Signed	Summer
FW	(Romania) Valentin Badea	(Romania) Jiul Petroşani	Signed	Summer
GK	(Romania) Cristian Brăneţ	(Israel) Tzafririm Holon	Signed	Summer
DF	(Romania) Robert Ciobanu	(Romania) FC Oneşti	Signed	Summer
MF	(Romania) Sorin Frunză	(Romania) Jiul Petroşani	Signed	Summer
GK	(Romania) Cristian Hăisan	(Romania) Dacia Unirea Brăila	Signed	Summer
DF	(Romania) Sorin Haraga	(Romania) Dunărea Galaţi	Signed	Summer
DF	(Romania) Fane Hărăianu	(Romania) Dunărea Galaţi	Signed	Summer
FW	(Romania) Flavius Hâdă	(Romania) Jiul Petroşani	Signed	Summer
GK	(Romania) Costel Nicolov		Signed	Summer
DF	(Romania) Gheorghe Pantazi	(Romania) Ceahlăul Piatra Neamţ	Signed	Summer
MF	(Romania) Alin Pânzaru	(Romania) Dunărea Galaţi	Signed	Summer
FW	(Romania) Adrian Popa	(Romania) Sportul Municipal Vaslui	Signed	Summer
DF	(Romania) Cătălin Popa	(Romania) Sportul Municipal Vaslui	Signed	Summer
MF	(Romania) Sorin Sava	(Romania) Sportul Municipal Vaslui	Signed	Summer
MF	(Romania) Cristian Strelţov	(Romania) Unirea Focşani	Signed	Summer
DF	(Romania) Tudorel Şoimaru	(Romania) Laminorul Roman	Signed	Summer
MF	(Romania) Emil Trăistariu	(Romania) Jiul Petroşani	Signed	Summer

== Squad ==
Updated 7 June 2003 Note: Flags indicate national team as defined under FIFA eligibility rules; some limited exceptions apply. Players may hold more than one non-FIFA nationality.

No.	Pos.	Nation	Player
-	GK	ROU	Cristian Brăneţ
-	GK	ROU	Cristian Hăisan
-	GK	ROU	Costel Nicolov
-	DF	ROU	Ababei
-	DF	ROU	Daniel Baciu
-	DF	ROU	Ionuţ Ciobanu
-	DF	ROU	Sorin Haraga
-	DF	ROU	Fane Hărăianu
-	DF	ROU	Alin Pânzaru
-	DF	ROU	Cătălin Popa
-	MF	ROU	Emanuel Amarandei

No.	Pos.	Nation	Player
-	MF	ROU	Romeo Buteseacă
-	MF	ROU	Victor Cozma
-	MF	ROU	Sorin Frunză
-	MF	ROU	Daniel Paica
-	MF	ROU	Tudorel Şoimaru
-	MF	ROU	Emil Trăistaru
-	MF	ROU	Sorin Ungurianu
-	FW	ROU	Cătălin Andruş
-	FW	ROU	Valentin Badea
-	FW	ROU	Giani Căpuşă
-	FW	ROU	Flavius Hâdă

== Divizia C ==
=== League table ===
Pos	Team	Pld	W	D	L	GF	GA	GD	Pts	Promotion or relegation
1	Unirea Urziceni (C, P)	28	21	3	4	49	16	+33	66	Promotion to Divizia B
2	Poiana Câmpina (P)	28	18	7	3	68	21	+47	61	Promotion to Divizia B
3	Chimia Brazi	28	17	7	4	67	23	+44	58	
4	Tricolorul Breaza	28	16	5	7	52	32	+20	53	
5	Conpet Ploiești	28	13	5	10	52	29	+23	44	
6	Petrolul Berca	28	13	5	10	55	44	+11	44	
7	Petrolul Brăila	28	14	2	12	50	47	+3	44	
8	Petrolistul Boldești	28	13	4	11	42	35	+7	43	
9	Tractorul Brașov	28	11	3	14	48	43	+5	36	
10	Dunărea Galați	28	10	5	13	36	30	+6	35	
11	Turistul Pietroasa Haleș	28	10	5	13	42	50	−8	35	
12	Olimpia Râmnicu Sărat	28	10	4	14	36	43	−7	34	
13	Metalul Băicoi (R)	28	8	3	17	42	55	−13	27	Relegation to Divizia D
14	Proodeftiki Adjud (R)	28	5	2	21	24	108	−84	17	Relegation to Divizia D
15	CS Voluntari (Note: CS Voluntari withdrew at the beginning of second part of the championship and lost all the remaining matches with 0–3.) (R)	28	1	0	27	8	95	−87	3	Relegation to Divizia D
16	Ambianța Slobozia (Note: Ambianța Slobozia withdrew from championship after round 6 and all its results were canceled.) (R)	0	0	0	0	0	0	0	0	Withdrew

Source: rsssf.org
Rules for classification: 1) Points; 2) Goal difference; 3) Number of goals scored.
(C) Champions; (P) Promoted; (R) Relegated

=== Results summary ===
Overall								Home						Away					
Pld	W	D	L	GF	GA	GD	Pts	W	D	L	GF	GA	GD	W	D	L	GF	GA	GD
28	21	2	5	76	15	+61	65	13	0	1	48	5	+43	8	2	4	28	10	+18

=== Matches ===
31 August 2002 Matchday 1	Viitorul Hârlău	1 – 3	Vaslui	Hârlău
11:00 EET	Cojocaru 54'		Amarandei 3'; Hâdă 33', 74'

7 September 2002 Matchday 2	Vaslui	2 – 0	Letea Bacău	Vaslui
11:00 EET	Hâdă 5'; A. Popa 90'			Stadium: Municipal

14 September 2002 Matchday 3	Petrolul Moineşti	3 – 2	Vaslui	Moinești
11:00 EET	Vasilache 33' (unknown) 45' (unknown) 65'	Report	A. Popa 12'; Badea 73'

21 September 2002 Matchday 4	Vaslui	3 – 1	CFR Moldova Iaşi	Vaslui
11:00 EET	Frunză 30', 70' (pen.); Trăistaru 90'		Voicu 44'	Stadium: Municipal

5 October 2002 Matchday 5	Vaslui	7 – 0	CFR Paşcani	Vaslui
11:00 EET	Badea 7'; Frunză 15'; Trăistaru 24'; Andruş 80', 84', 85'; A. Popa 82'			Stadium: Municipal

12 October 2002 Matchday 6	Cimentul Bicaz	0 – 2	Vaslui	Bicaz
11:00 EET			Frunză 52'; Hâdă 62'

19 October 2002 Matchday 7	Vaslui	4 – 0	Unirea Negreşti	Vaslui
11:00 EET	Andruş 16'; Trăistaru 30'; Şoimaru 79'; A. Popa 90'			Stadium: Municipal

26 October 2002 Matchday 8	Ceahlăul Piatra Neamţ II	0 – 9	Vaslui	Piatra Neamţ
11:00 EET		Report	Hâdă 7', 56'; Andruş 11'; Frunză 20', 73' (pen.); Atănăsoaie 48'; Badea 59', 90'; Trăistaru 62'

2 November 2002 Matchday 9	Vaslui	1 – 0	Aerostar Bacău	Vaslui
11:00 EET	Hâdă 16'			Stadium: Municipal

9 November 2002 Matchday 10	Laminorul Roman	3 – 0	Vaslui	Roman
11:00 EET	Beceru 24'; Ţapu 47'; Bolfa 56'	Report

16 November 2002 Matchday 11	Vaslui	3 – 1	FC Botoşani	Vaslui
11:00 EET	Şoimaru 1'; Frunză 34' (pen.); Trăistaru 71'		Verenciuc 88'	Stadium: Municipal

23 November 2002 Matchday 12	Rafinăria Dărmăneşti	0 – 3	Vaslui	Dărmăneşti
11:00 EET		Report	Frunză 44', 88' (pen.); Badea

30 November 2002 Matchday 13	Vaslui	4 – 1	Bucovina Rădăuţi	Vaslui
11:00 EET	Hâdă 62', 69', 78'; Andruş 67'	Report	Roman (??)	Stadium: Municipal

7 December 2002 Matchday 14	Rulmentul Bârlad	0 – 3	Vaslui	Bârlad
11:00 EET		Report	Andruş 39', 75' (pen.); Badea 45'

15 March 2003 Matchday 15	Vaslui	2 – 0	Viitorul Hârlău	Vaslui
11:00 EET	Trăistaru 7'; Badea 73'	Report		Stadium: Municipal

22 March 2003 Matchday 16	FCM Bacău II (Note: Letea Bacău were acquired by FCM Bacău and competed as FCM Bacău II after round 11)	0 – 1	Vaslui	Bacău
11:00 EET		Report	Badea 63'

29 March 2003 Matchday 17	Vaslui	1 – 2	Petrolul Moineşti	Vaslui
11:00 EET	Frunză 38' (pen.)		Chiriac 31'; G. Viorel 81'	Stadium: Municipal

5 April 2003 Matchday 18	CFR Moldova Iaşi	0 – 0	Vaslui	Iași
11:00 EET		Report

16 April 2003 Matchday 19	CFR Paşcani	1 – 0	Vaslui	Paşcani
11:00 EET	(unknown)

19 April 2003 Matchday 20	Vaslui	1 – 0	Cimentul Bicaz	Vaslui
11:00 EET	(unknown)			Stadium: Municipal

25 April 2003 Matchday 21	Unirea Negreşti	0 – 3 (Note: Unirea Negreşti withdrew after the winter break and had all matches in the second half of the season awarded 0-3 against them)	Vaslui

3 May 2003 Matchday 22	Vaslui	9 – 0	Ceahlăul Piatra Neamţ II	Vaslui
11:00 EET	Căpuşă 3'; Frunză 9' (pen.); Şoimaru 31'; Badea 35', 43'; Cozma 45'; Pânzaru 51'; Ungureanu 76', 86'			Stadium: Municipal

7 May 2003 Matchday 23	Aerostar Bacău	0 – 0	Vaslui	Bacău
11:00 EET

10 May 2003 Matchday 24	Vaslui	2 – 0	Laminorul Roman	Vaslui
11:00 EET	Badea 19'; Cozma 77'	ăhttp://ziarulevenimentul.ro/stiri-2/Tabloid/derbi-de-calitate--34265.html Reportî		Stadium: Municipal

17 May 2003 Matchday 25	FC Botoşani	0 – 1	Vaslui	Botoşani
11:00 EET			Bordeanu 44' (o.g.)	Stadium: Municipal

24 May 2003 Matchday 26	Vaslui	5 – 0	Rafinăria Dărmăneşti	Vaslui
11:00 EET	Căpuşă 13'; Frunză 17', 70' (pen.); Badea 40', 60'			Stadium: Municipal

31 May 2003 Matchday 27	Bucovina Rădăuţi	2 – 1	Vaslui	Rădăuţi
11:00 EET	Roman 44'; Păcurar 92'	Report	Frunză 33'

7 June 2003 Matchday 28	Vaslui	4 – 0	Rulmentul Bârlad	Vaslui
11:00 EET	Căpuşă 13'; Frunză 69', 80' (pen.); Badea 75'			Stadium: Municipal

== Cupa României ==
11 September 2002 Round 3	Vaslui	4 – 0	CFR Paşcani	Vaslui
16:00 EET	S. Frunză, C. Popa; Şoimaru			Stadium: Municipal; Referee: Marius Bocăneală

25 September 2002 Round 4	Vaslui	1 – 2	Unirea Focşani	Vaslui
16:00 EET	Andruş 70'	Report	Ghirie 64'; Dogaru 100'	Stadium: Municipal
