= Gabriel Bosoi =

Romanian professional footballer

Personal information
- Date of birth: 11 August 1987 (age 39)
- Place of birth: Șuțești, Romania
- Height: 1.73 m (5 ft 8 in)
- Position: Right-back

Team information
- Current team: ASD Lunano Calcio
- Number: 8

Youth career
- –2006: Petrolul Brăila

Senior career*
Years	Team	Apps	(Gls)
2006–2013	CF Brăila	190	(31)
2014–2019	Politehnica Iași	105	(8)
2019–	ASD Lunano Calcio	22	(3)
- * Club domestic league appearances and goals as of 15 February 2020

Gabriel Bosoi (born 11 August 1987) is a Romanian professional footballer who plays as a right-back for Prima Categoria Marche side ASD Lunano Calcio.

== Honours ==
CF Brăila

- Liga III: 2009–10

Studențesc Iași

- Liga II: 2013–14
