= Gideon Ebijitimi =

Nigerianfootballer

Personal information
- Date of birth: 26 November 1981 (age 44)
- Place of birth: Lagos, Nigeria
- Height: 1.77 m (5 ft 10 in)
- Position: Midfielder

Youth career
- Lagos Islanders

Senior career*
Years	Team	Apps	(Gls)
2001	Oțelul Galați	8	(0)
2002	Apulum Alba Iulia	26	(4)
2003	Minaur Zlatna	13	(1)
2004	Petrolul Ploiești	3	(0)
2005	FC Vaslui	13	(2)
2005–2007	CSM Reșița		
2007–2008	Forex Brașov	22	(9)
2009	FC Hunedoara		
2009–2010	Minerul Lupeni		
2010–2011	FC Hunedoara		
2011	Millenium Giarmata		
- * Club domestic league appearances and goals

Gideon Ebijitimi (born 26 November 1981) is a Nigerian former professional footballer.

== Career ==
The striker played his professional debut in the Romanian Liga I on 11 August 2001 in the game of his club Oțelul Galați against UM Timişoara. After on season was released and he played than with the clubs Apulum Alba Iulia, Minaur Zlatna, Petrolul Ploiesti, FC Vaslui, CSM Reșița, Forex Brașov, Corvinul Hunedoara, CS Minerul Lupeni, FC Hunedoara.
