= Nivaldo (footballer, born 1977) =

Brazilian footballer

Personal information
- Full name: Nivaldo Vieira Lima
- Date of birth: 8 November 1977 (age 48)
- Place of birth: São Luís, Maranhão, Brazil
- Height: 1.79 m (5 ft 10 in)
- Position: Defensive midfielder

Youth career
- 1990–1993: Sampaio Corrêa

Senior career*
Years	Team	Apps	(Gls)
1993–1998	Gent	50	(3)
1998–2000	K.F.C. Lommel	21	(0)
2000–2001	Rapid București	7	(0)
2001–2004	FCM Bacău	46	(4)
2004–2005	FC Vaslui	7	(0)
Total		131	(7)
- * Club domestic league appearances and goals

Nivaldo Vieira Lima (born 8 November 1977), known simply as Nivaldo, is a Brazilian former footballer who played as a midfielder.

== Honours ==
FC Vaslui

- Divizia B: 2004–05
