= Mbemba Sylla =

Guinean footballer

Personal information
- Full name: Mbemba Sylla
- Date of birth: 14 July 1982 (age 44)
- Place of birth: Conakry, Guinea
- Position: Defender

Youth career
- FC Metz

Senior career*
Years	Team	Apps	(Gls)
2000–2001	RFC Liège		
2001–2003	Mons	4	(0)
2003–2004	Naţional București	20	(1)
2004–2006	FC Vaslui	12	(1)
2006–2009	Maritzburg United	25	(1)
2009	Black Aces	13	(0)
2010–2012	African Warriors		
2012	Sivutsa Stars		
2013	PSIR Rembang		
2014	Persepam		
2014–2016	AS Kaloum		

International career^{‡}
2013	Guinea	1	(0)
- * Club domestic league appearances and goals as of 12 April 2019 ‡ National team caps and goals as of 12 April 2019

Mbemba Sylla (born 14 July 1982 in Conakry) is a Guineean former footballer.

== Honours ==
FC Vaslui

- Liga II: 2004–05
