= Iftimie Ilisei Stadium =

Stadium in Romania

- Cimentul Stadium
- Interactive map of Iftimie Ilisei Stadium
- Former names: Stadionul Municipal (1978–2008)
- Address: Str. Podgoriilor, nr. 1
- Location: Medgidia, Romania
- Coordinates: 44°14′53″N 28°15′27″E
- Owner: Municipality of Medgidia
- Operator: Medgidia
- Capacity: 32,700 (65 seated)
- Surface: Grass

Construction
- Opened: 22 October 1978

Tenant
- Medgidia (1978–present)

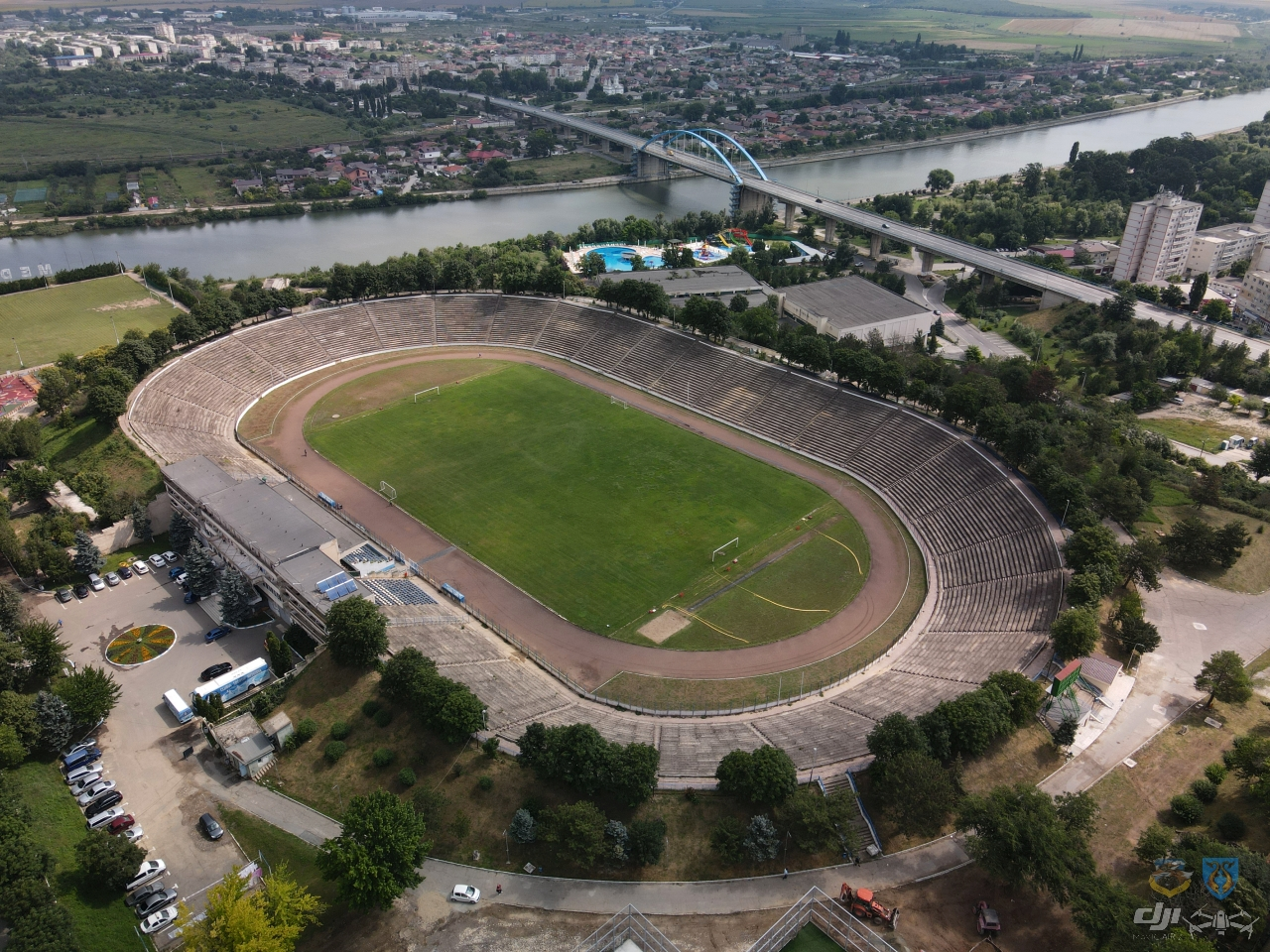
Stadionul Iftimie Ilisei bird's eye view

The Iftimie Ilisei Stadium is a multi-use stadium in Medgidia, Romania. It is currently used mostly for football matches and is the home ground of Medgidia. The stadium holds 32,700 people.

It was opened on 22 October 1978 and was known as the Municipal Stadium until 2008 when it was renamed after Iftimie Ilisei, the former mayor of Medgidia who built it.

It is the 2nd stadium in the country by capacity (List of football stadiums in Romania).
