= Brăila Municipal Stadium =

Romanian stadium

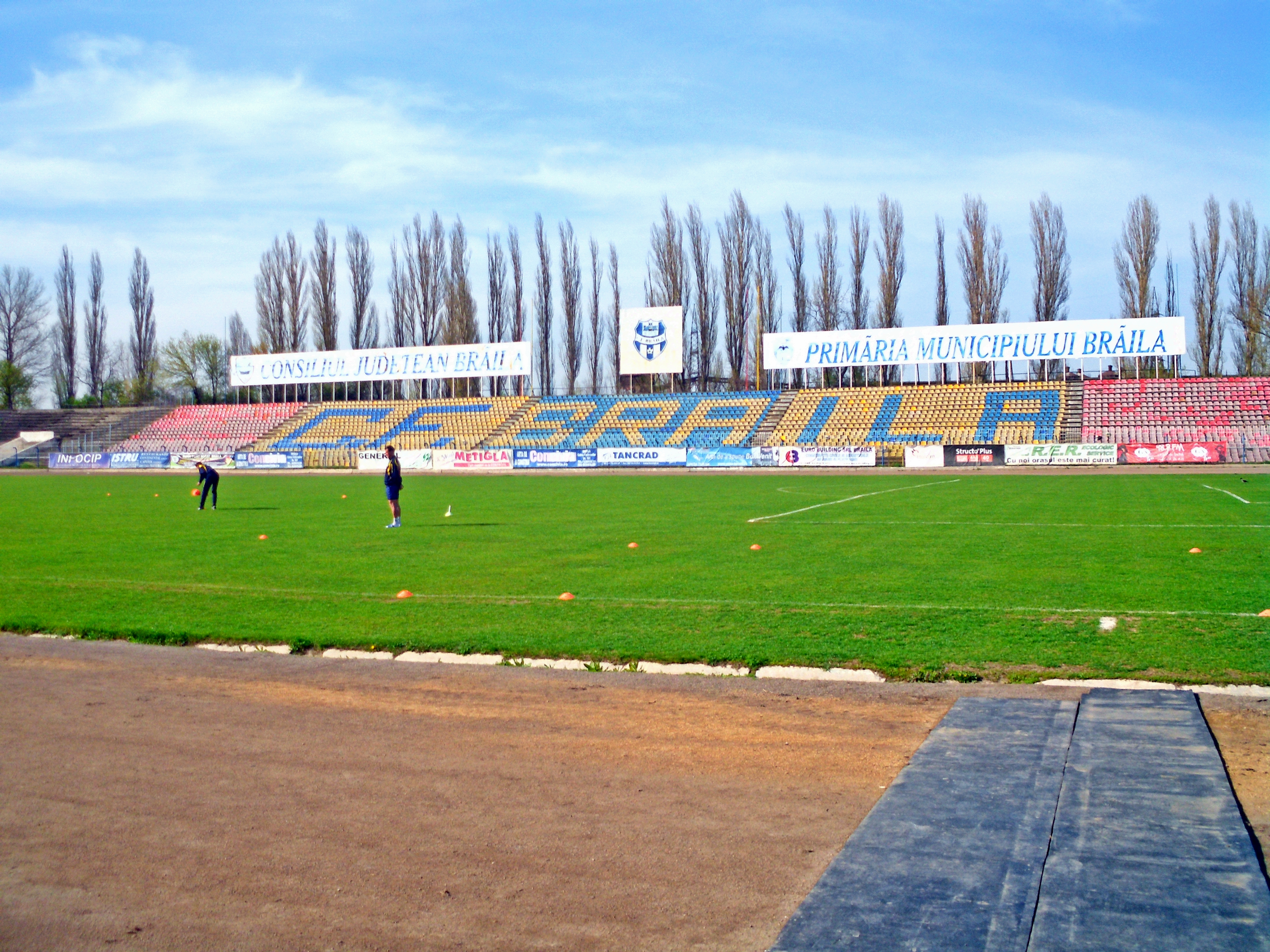
- Interactive map of Brăila Municipal Stadium
- Address: Parcul Monument, nr. 1
- Location: Brăila, Romania
- Coordinates: 45°15′29.01″N 27°56′49.74″E
- Owner: Municipality of Brăila
- Operator: Dacia Unirea Brăila
- Capacity: 20,154 (6,814 seated)
- Surface: Grass
- Record attendance: 30,000; Dacia Unirea-Dinamo; 1 December 2004
- Field size: 105 x 68m

Construction
- Groundbreaking: 1970
- Opened: August 21, 1974
- Renovated: 2012

Tenant
- Dacia Unirea Brăila (1974–present)

Website
- Fans website

The Brăila Municipal Stadium (Romanian: Stadionul Municipal) is a multi-purpose stadium in Brăila, Romania, and is the home ground of Dacia Unirea Brăila. It holds 20,154 people.

The stadium was opened on August 21, 1974 and was built on the ground of the old Vasile Roaită Stadium, a small stadium that had only one stand. Over time the stadium was renovated, the most recent were made in the summer of 2008, ending up with the mounting of 8,000 seats on the 1st and 2nd stand, decreasing its capacity from 25,000 to 20,000 also in 2012 the seats from Main Stand were changed in the club colors white and blue.

It holds motorcycle speedway events like the Speedway European Championship (qualifying round 3).

== Construction ==
The old stadium Vasile Roaită was demolished between December 1970 and February 1971, also Dacia Unirea Brăila moves his home ground to Progresul Stadium during the construction. Construction of the new stadium were held for 4 years and on 21 August 1974 was inaugurated.

== Facilities ==
The venue holds 20,154 people and from this capacity only 6,814 are seats. Also only 1,038 seats are covered at Main Stand. 200 VIP seats are available, with another 20 seats allotted for the press; the stadium has 21 entries and 50 parking spaces.

== Usage ==
Municipal Stadium holds football competition like Liga II and Cupa Romaniei and motorcycle speedway events like the Speedway European Championship (qualifying round 3).

== Notable high audience matches ==
The highest audience for a football game was achieved at the match between (Romania) Dacia Unirea Brăila and (Romania) FC Dinamo București, hosted on 1 December 2004, which brought 30,000 people to the stadium.

The 2nd highest audience was achieved in a Liga I match hosted on 15 March 1992. The game between local team, (Romania) Dacia Unirea Brăila and (Romania) FC Steaua București, brought 25,000 people to the stadium.

== Transport ==
The stadium is served by public transport with bus and trams. Stadium is located to the south-west of Brăila.

== Photo gallery ==
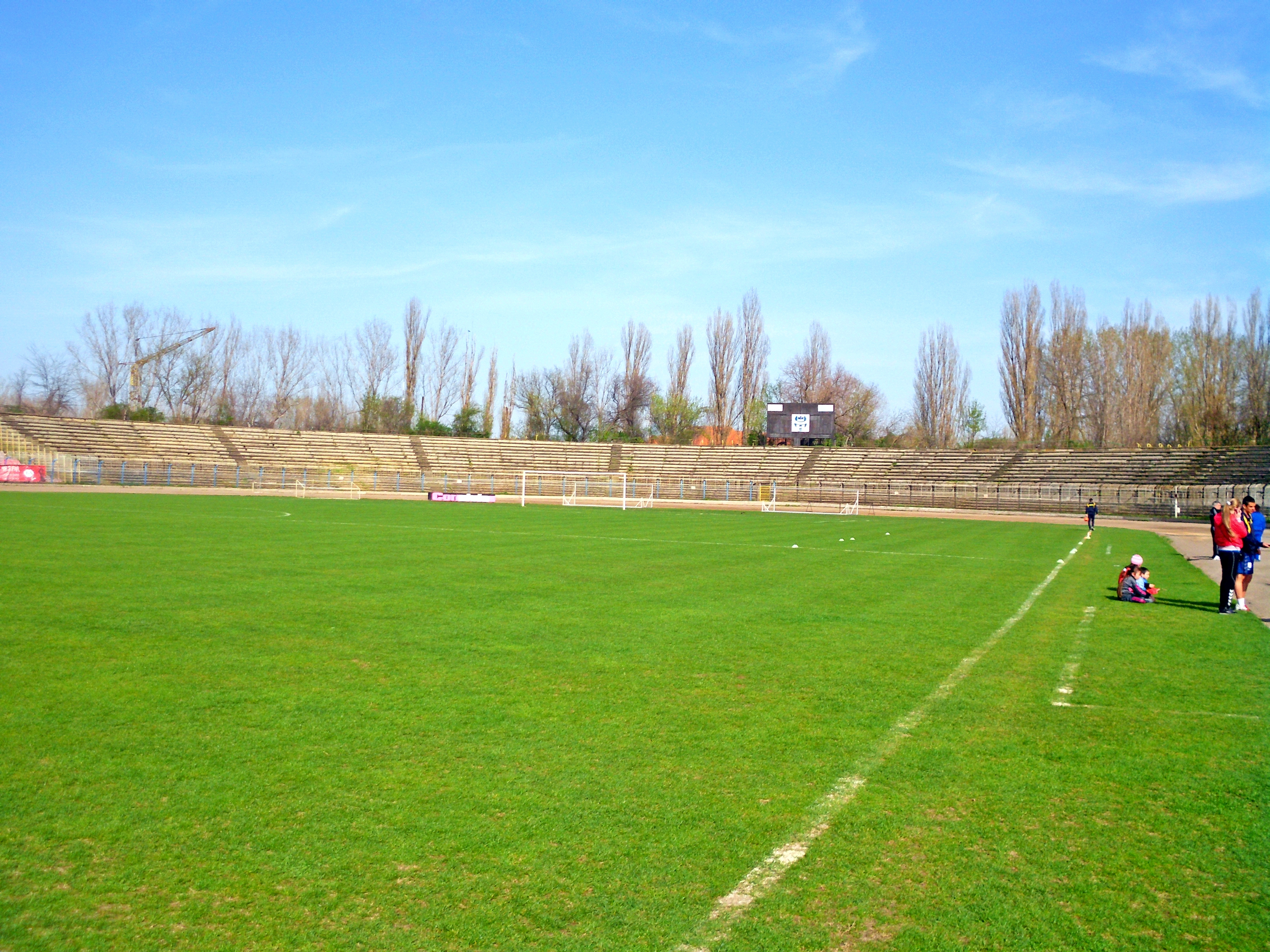
Stadion Municipal Braila

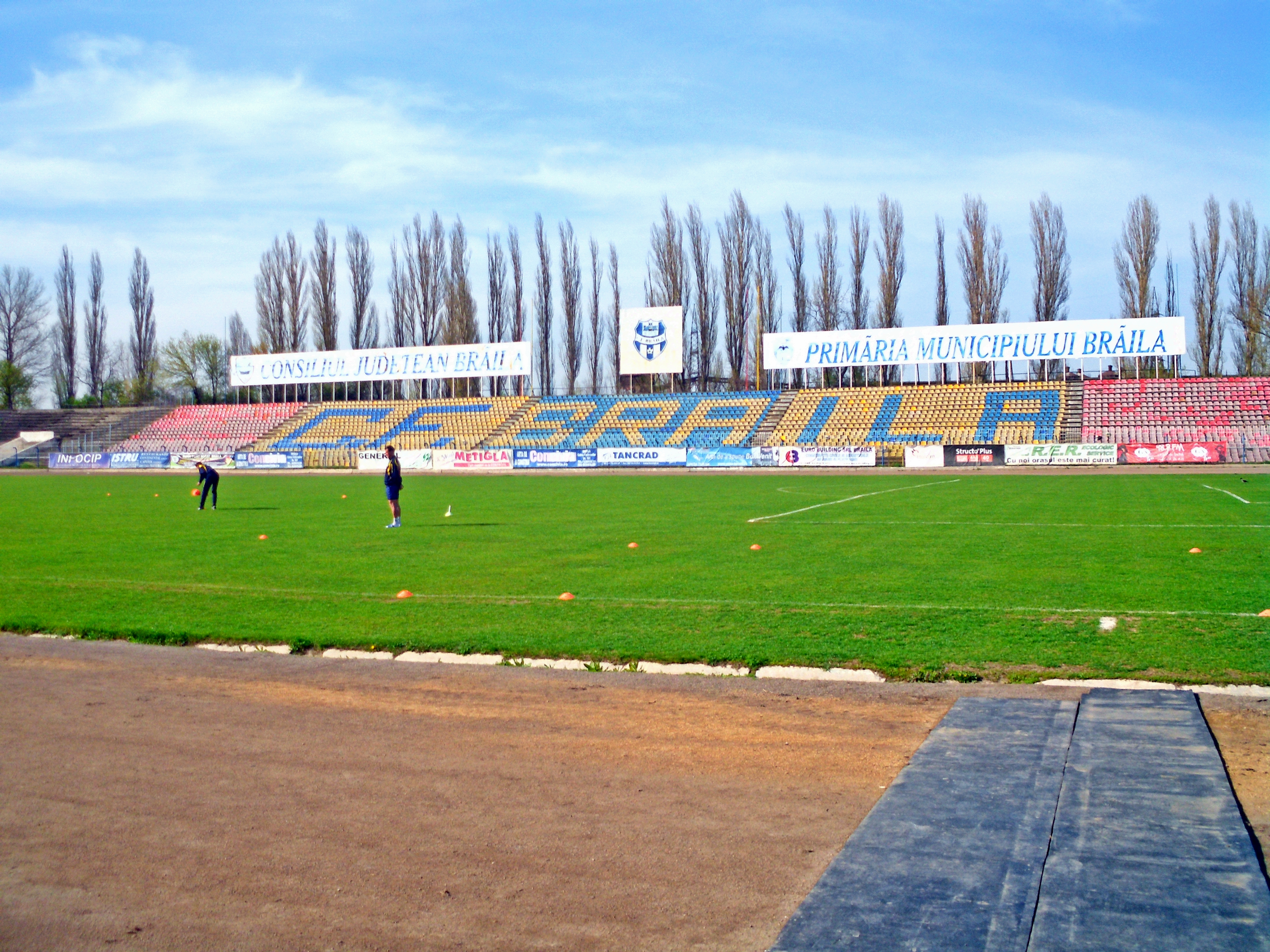
Stadion Municipal Braila

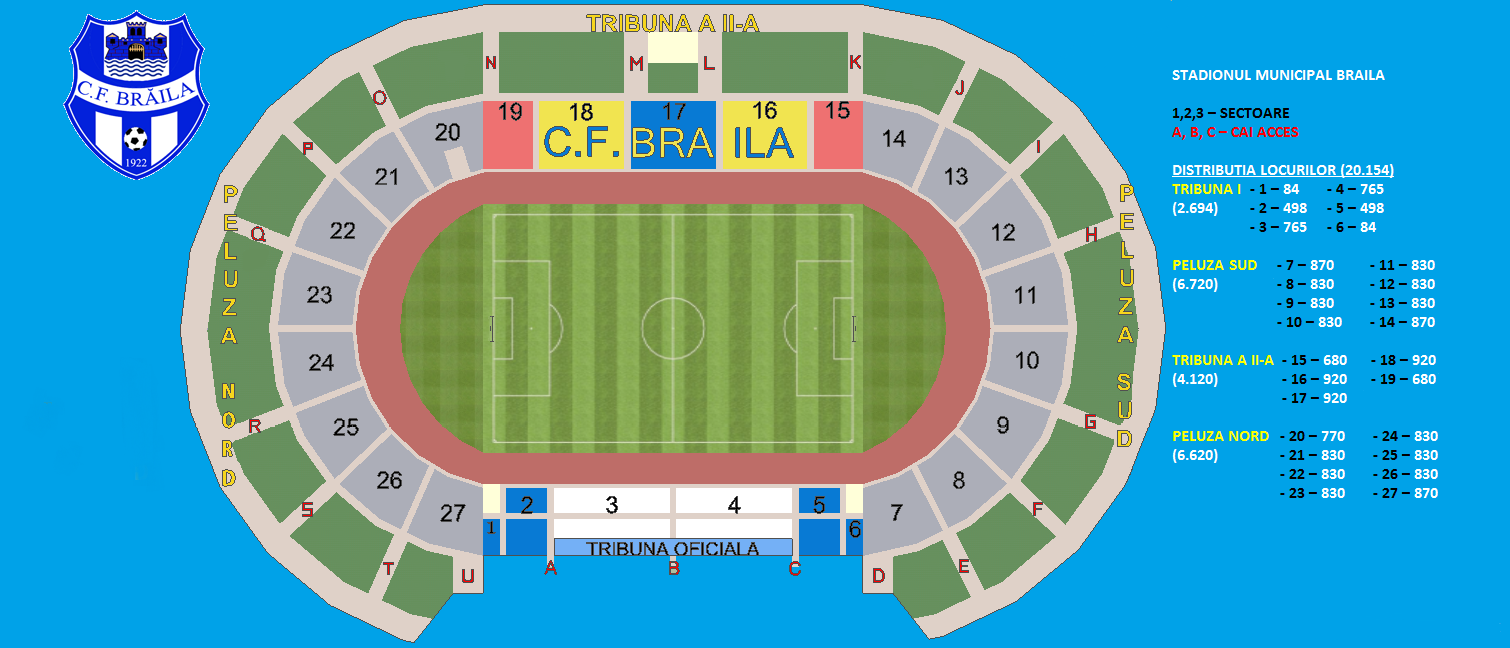
Stadium plan

== See also ==
- List of football stadiums in Romania
