= Valentin Badea =

Romanian footballer

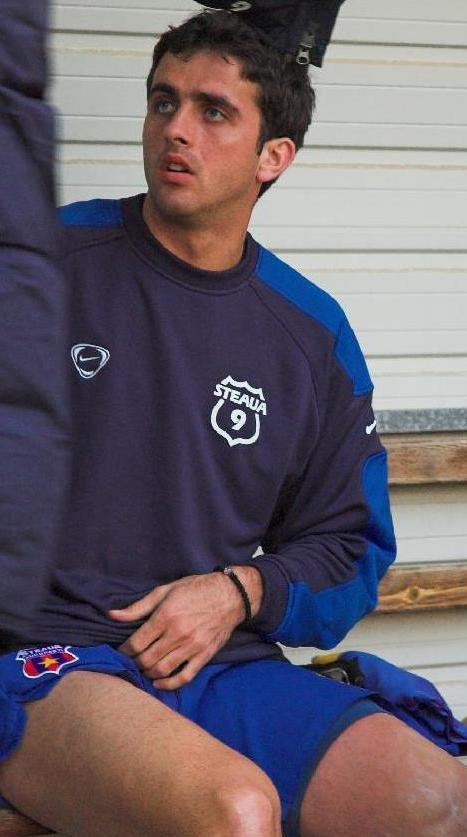

Personal information
- Full name: Valentin Vasile Badea
- Date of birth: 23 October 1982 (age 44)
- Place of birth: Alexandria, Romania
- Height: 1.82 m (6 ft 0 in)
- Position: Forward

Youth career
- Rulmentul Alexandria

Senior career*
Years	Team	Apps	(Gls)
2000–2001	Rulmentul Alexandria		
2001–2002	Jiul Petroşani	22	(5)
2002–2006	Vaslui	103	(42)
2006–2008	Steaua București	50	(15)
2008	→ Panserraikos (loan)	3	(0)
2009	Universitatea Craiova	13	(2)
2010	Politehnica Iaşi	11	(1)
2010	Braşov	10	(1)
2011	Al Ain	1	(0)
2011	Concordia Chiajna	3	(0)
2012	Farul Constanţa	11	(1)
2013	UTA Arad	3	(0)
Total		231	(68)
- * Club domestic league appearances and goals

Valentin Vasile Badea (born 23 October 1982) is a Romanian former professional footballer who played as a forward.

== Career ==
Badea was born in Alexandria.

On 2001 Jiul bought Badea for €1,000 from Rulmentul Alexandria.

Prior to 2006, when Badea joined Steaua București, he also played for Rulmentul Alexandria, Jiul Petroşani and FC Vaslui.

He was discovered by Ioan Sdrobiş while he was playing for Rulmentul Alexandria in Romania's third division and where Badea was the team's top goalscorer. Sdrobiş then brought him to Jiul Petroşani, and then to FC Vaslui where he was the coach.

In 2006 Steaua paid €1 million for Badea.

On 23 August 2006 he has scored two goals in the match against Standard Liège, in the third qualifying round of UEFA Champions League, goals which sent Steaua București into the group stage after ten years of absence.

On 20 December 2009, he was released from FC Universitatea Craiova.

On 24 February 2010, he signed with Al Ain.

Badea's last contract was with Liga II team UTA Arad.

== Political career ==
Badea was elected as local councillor in Alexandria in 2024, as a member of the Social Democratic Party.

== Career statistics ==
Appearances and goals by club, season and competition
Club	Season	League		National cup		Continental		Total	
Club	Season	Apps	Goals	Apps	Goals	Apps	Goals	Apps	Goals
Jiul Petroşani	2001–02	22	5	0	0	–		22	5
Vaslui	2002–03	23	14	1	0	–		24	14
Vaslui	2003–04	27	12	1	0	–		28	12
Vaslui	2004–05	30	11	2	1	–		32	12
Vaslui	2005–06	23	5	0	0	–		23	5
Vaslui	Total	103	42	4	1	0	0	107	43
Steaua București	2006–07	33	13	4+1	0	11	4	49	17
Steaua București	2007–08	16	2	2	1	6	1	24	4
Steaua București	2008–09	1	0	0	0	0	0	1	0
Steaua București	Total	50	15	7	1	17	5	74	22
Panserraikos (loan)	2008–09	3	0	0	0	–		3	0
Universitatea Craiova	2009–10	13	2	2	0	–		15	2
Politehnica Iaşi	2009–10	12	1	0	0	–		12	1
Braşov	2010–11	10	1	2	1	–		12	2
Al Ain	2010–11	1	0	0	0	5	0	6	0
Concordia Chiajna	2011–12	3	1	0	0	–		3	1
Farul Constanța	2011–12	11	1	0	0	–		11	1
UTA Arad	2012–13	3	0	0	0	–		3	0
Career total		231	68	15	3	22	5	268	76

== Honours ==
FC Vaslui

- Liga II: 2004–05
