= Sorin Frunză =

Romanian footballer

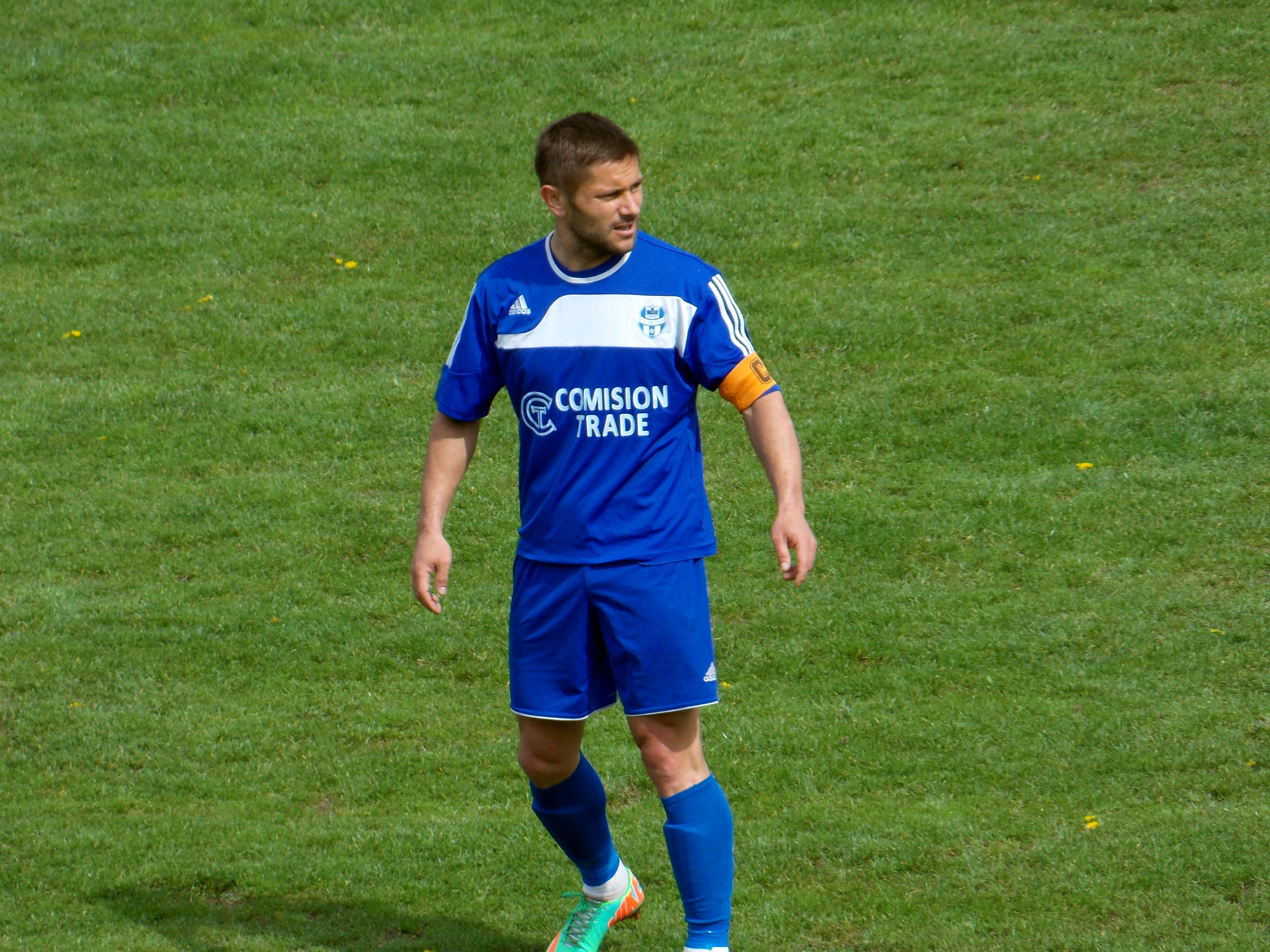

Personal information
- Full name: Sorin Cătălin Frunză
- Date of birth: 29 March 1978 (age 48)
- Place of birth: Jorăști, Romania
- Height: 1.70 m (5 ft 7 in)
- Position: Left midfielder

Team information
- Current team: Avântul Valea Mărului
- Number: 10

Youth career
- Dunărea Galați

Senior career*
Years	Team	Apps	(Gls)
1997–1999	Dunărea Galați	28	(4)
1999	Cimentul Fieni	31	(5)
2000	Politehnica Timişoara	7	(1)
2000–2001	Dacia Unirea Brăila	28	(19)
2001–2002	Jiul Petroşani	28	(7)
2002–2004	FC Vaslui	54	(28)
2004	FC U Craiova	15	(1)
2005–2008	FC Vaslui	60	(7)
2007	→ Botoşani (loan)	16	(2)
2008–2010	Unirea Urziceni	63	(5)
2010–2011	Rapid București	24	(2)
2011–2012	Oțelul Galați	14	(0)
2012–2018	Dacia Unirea Brăila	134	(23)
2019	CSU Galați	7	(0)
2019–2022	Avântul Valea Mărului	47	(16)
Total		542	(114)

Managerial career
- 2024–: Unirea Brăniștea (assistant)
- * Club domestic league appearances and goals as of 29 March 2020

Sorin Cătălin Frunză (born 29 March 1978) is a Romanian professional footballer who plays as a left midfielder for Liga IV side Avântul Valea Mărului.

Frunză began his career at Dunărea Galați. After one year spent at Cimentul Fieni and Politehnica Timişoara and two one-year spells at Dacia Unirea Brăila and Jiul Petroşani, Frunză moved in 2002 to newly founded Vaslui, and spent two seasons at the club before a transfer to Universitatea Craiova in the Romanian first division. However, following a dispute between Vaslui and Craiova over $50,000 that the former was to receive from the latter, Frunză returned to Vaslui after only six months. He was appointed team captain and helped Vaslui to gain a historical promotion in Divizia A, after only three years since the club foundation.

On 30 March 2008, Frunză alongside team-mates Silviu Bălace and Daniel Sabou were accused by Adrian Porumboiu of fixing a match against Steaua București. As a consequence, he was relegated to Vaslui's second team and subsequently sold to Unirea Urziceni. He won the first and only league championship of his career with the Wolves, as part of the squad that conquered the season's Liga I title. In 2010, as a result of Unirea Urziceni's decline, Frunză was released and subsequently moved to Rapid București. He returned one year later at his youth club Oțelul Galați, but he failed to make an impact. In 2012, he returned for a second spell at Dacia Unirea Brăila in the Romanian second tier.

== Career ==
Frunză started his professional career at Oțelul Galați. He moved after that at Cimentul Fieni, Politehnica Timişoara and Jiul Petroşani, before he signed for FC Vaslui, when the team was in the 3rd Division. He managed to win the promotion with Vaslui and became the team captain because of his good display.

=== Universitatea Craiova ===
In the 2004–05 summer, he was loaned to U Craiova, but he stayed there only half of season, after that he returned at Vaslui, where he succeeded promotion for the first time in history club, in Liga I.

=== FC Vaslui ===
He played only half of the season at FC Vaslui in the 2005–06 season, an injury causing him troubles for playing in that season. In the next season, he played only two matches, because a conflict with the coach Viorel Hizo, and in the second part of the season, he was loaned to FC Botoşani.

He returned in the next season, where he was chosen vice-captain from the team, after Bogdan Panait. Because of his good performance, he was named captain of the team, and he was one of the best assisters from the Championship. He scored two goals in the FC Vaslui 2–1 victory against the champions, FC Dinamo București, and he scored one of the most beautiful goals from the Romanian Championship history, against Universitatea Craiova, recovering in his own half, and after dribbling three players, he shot with his right foot, right to the bottom corner. At the end of the season he was sold to Unirea Urziceni, for almost $200.000 .

=== Unirea Urziceni ===
Frunză quickly established himself as a key member in Dan Petrescu's team and helped the side to its first championship title in history in the 2008–09 season. Frunză was a starter in all six Champions League matches for Unirea as the team finished third with eight points, behind FC Sevilla and Vfb Stuttgart, but ahead of Rangers. On 6 March 2010, Frunză was named best player of Unirea in the derby against Steaua Bucharest after scoring once and providing an assist for team-mate Marius Onofras.

=== Rapid București ===
After Unirea disbanded, Frunză joined FC Rapid București, but failed to impress and ended his contract after only one season.

=== Oțelul Galați ===
In July 2012, Frunză signed up for Oţelul Galaţi on a one-year-contract. He was on the bench for the Romanian Supercup, game won by Oțelul against FC Steaua București. At the end of his contract, in June 2012, he was released by Oțelul.

=== Dacia Unirea Brăila ===
After he was released by Oțelul, Sorin Frunză signed up for Dacia Unirea Brăila the fierce rivals of Oţelul Galaţi. He quickly established himself as a key member of the team.

== Honours ==
Unirea Urziceni

- Liga I: 2008–09

Oțelul Galați

- Supercupa României: 2011

CSU Galați

- Liga IV – Galați County: 2018–19
- Cupa României – Galați County: 2018–19

== Statistics ==
Statistics accurate as of match played 9 December 2017

Club	Season	League		Cup		Europe		Other		Total	
Club	Season	Apps	Goals	Apps	Goals	Apps	Goals	Apps	Goals	Apps	Goals
Dunărea Galaţi	1997–98	17	1			—		—		17	1
Dunărea Galaţi	1998–99	11	3			—		—		11	3
Total		28	4			0	0	0	0	28	4
Cimentul Fieni	1998–99	19	2			—		—		19	2
Cimentul Fieni	1999–00	12	3			—		—		12	3
Total		31	5			0	0	0	0	31	5
Poli Timişoara	1999–00	7	1			—		—		7	1
Total		7	1			0	0	0	0	7	1
Dacia Unirea Brăila	2000–01	28	19	2	0	—		—		30	19
Total		28	19	2	0	0	0	0	0	30	19
Jiul Petroşani	2001–02	28	7			—		—		28	7
Total		28	7			0	0	0	0	28	7
Vaslui	2002–03	27	16	2	2	—		—		29	18
Vaslui	2003–04	27	12	2	0	—		—		29	12
Vaslui	2004–05	15	3	0	0	—		—		15	3
Vaslui	2005–06	13	0	1	0	—		—		14	0
Vaslui	2006–07	2	0	0	0	—		—		2	0
Vaslui	2007–08	30	4	1	0	—		—		31	4
Total		114	35	6	2	0	0	0	0	120	37
Universitatea Craiova	2004–05	15	1	4	1	—		—		19	2
Total		15	1	4	1	0	0	0	0	19	2
Botoşani	2006–07	15	2	0	0	—		—		15	2
Total		15	2	0	0	0	0	0	0	15	2
Unirea Urziceni	2008–09	25	1	3	1	1	0	—		29	2
Unirea Urziceni	2009–10	32	4	2	0	7	0	1	1	42	5
Unirea Urziceni	2010–11	6	0	0	0	4	1	—		10	1
Total		63	5	5	1	12	1	1	1	81	8
Rapid București	2010–11	24	2	3	2	—		—		27	4
Total		24	2	3	2	0	0	0	0	27	4
Oțelul Galați	2011–12	14	0	2	0	5	0	—		21	0
Total		14	0	2	0	5	0	0	0	21	0
Dacia Unirea Brăila	2012–13	19	2	2	0	—		—		21	2
Dacia Unirea Brăila	2013–14	31	3	1	0	—		—		32	3
Dacia Unirea Brăila	2014–15	25	3	2	0	—		—		27	3
Dacia Unirea Brăila	2015–16	33	6	2	0	—		—		35	6
Dacia Unirea Brăila	2016–17	10	1	2	1	—		—		12	2
Dacia Unirea Brăila	2017–18	16	8	1	0	—		—		17	8
Total		134	23	10	1	0	0	0	0	139	24
Career Total		501	104	32	7	17	1	1	1	546	113

Sporting positions
Preceded by None / Unknown	FC Vaslui captain 2003–2008	Succeeded by Gabriel Cânu
