= Gabriel Kajcsa =

Romanian footballer

Personal information
- Date of birth: 7 July 1974 (age 52)
- Place of birth: Brașov, Romania
- Height: 1.85 m (6 ft 1 in)
- Position: Goalkeeper

Youth career
- 1990–1994: Tractorul Brașov

Senior career*
Years	Team	Apps	(Gls)
1994–1995	Tractorul Brașov		
1995–1996	Romradiatoare Brașov		
1996–2000	FC Brașov	42	(0)
2000–2002	SM Vaslui		(0)
2002–2003	Politehnica Iaşi	12	(0)
2003–2005	FC Vaslui	43	(0)
2005–2007	Forex Braşov	47	(0)
2007–2011	FC Brașov	16	(0)

Managerial career
- 2013–2015: FC Harman
- 2016–2018: Academia Celta Brașov (youth)
- 2018–: Al-Hazem (GK coach)
- * Club domestic league appearances and goals as of 20 February 2010 ‡ National team caps and goals as of 10 September 2009

Gabriel Kajcsa (born 7 July 1974) is a Romanian football coach and former player.

== Managerial career ==
After retiring as a player, Kajcsa pursued a career in coaching. He managed FC Harman between 2013 and 2015, followed by a role with Academia Celta Brașov (youth) from 2016 to 2018. Since 2018, he has been the goalkeeping coach for Al-Hazem.

== Personal life ==
Gabriel Kajcsa has one child, a daughter named Isabella Maria Kajcsa.
