= Alin Pânzaru =

Romanian footballer

Personal information
- Full name: Alin Cristinel Pânzaru
- Date of birth: 18 January 1976 (age 50)
- Place of birth: Iași, Romania
- Height: 1.76 m (5 ft 9 in)
- Position: Midfielder

Youth career
- –1993: CSȘ Vaslui

Senior career*
Years	Team	Apps	(Gls)
1993–1997	Oțelul Galați	16	(0)
1994–1995	→ Constant CFR Galați (loan)	6	(0)
1998–2003	Dunărea Galați	62	(7)
2003–2005	Vaslui	60	(4)
2004	→ Gloria Buzău (loan)	12	(1)
2005–2006	Zimbru Chișinău	25	(2)
2007–2012	CF Brăila	76	(3)
Total		257	(17)

Managerial career
- 2012–2018: Dacia Unirea Brăila
- 2018–2019: Oțelul Galați
- 2019: CSM Alexandria
- 2020–2022: UTA Arad (assistant)
- 2022: Universitatea Craiova (assistant)
- 2022–2023: UTA Arad (assistant)
- 2023: CSM Alexandria
- 2024: Petrolul Ploiești (assistant)
- 2024–2025: Dacia Unirea Brăila (technical director)
- 2025–2026: Oțelul Galați (assistant)
- * Club domestic league appearances and goals

Alin Cristinel Pânzaru (Romanian pronunciation: [aˈlin kristiˈnel pɨnˈzaru]; born 18 January 1976) is a Romanian former professional footballer who played as a midfielder.

== Career ==
Pânzaru made his Liga I debut on 4 December 1993, for Oțelul Galați in a 1–1 draw against Inter Sibiu. In the first nine years of his career Pânzaru played mainly for teams from Galați such as: Oțelul Galați, Dunărea Galați or Constant CFR Galați. In 2003 he signed a contract with FC Vaslui, then playing for Gloria Buzău and the Moldovan side Zimbru Chișinău. In 2007 he moved to Oțelul Galați and Dunărea Galați bitter rival, Dacia Unirea Brăila, named CF Brăila at that time, and played there in more than 100 matches, until his retirement in 2012.

In 2012, after retirement, Pânzaru started immediately his football manager career at his last club as a player Dacia Unirea Brăila.

== Trivia ==
During the 2017–18 Liga II season he was the protagonist of a controversial moment, when he accused Gabriel Iosofache and Costel Roșu, two of the club players, of match fixing. Dacia Unirea was already in the middle of some media speculations at that moment due to some results with frequent score changes, such as: 2–3 (ASU Politehnica Timișoara), 4–4 (Știința Miroslava), 4–3 (Luceafărul Oradea), 2–3 (Olimpia Satu Mare), 3–4 (UTA Arad) or 3–3 (Pandurii Târgu Jiu). The rumors were also relied on the poor financial situation of the team, with some outstanding salaries of almost a year, the big scandal born at Luceafărul Oradea after the match against Brăila, when the owner of the club retired, the coach suspected his players of being involved in the betting mafia and finally the club being close to implosion and also Dacia Unirea's matches started to disappear from the betting offer.

== Honours ==
=== Player ===
Vaslui

- Divizia B: 2004–05

CF Brăila

- Liga III: 2009–10
