= AFC Dacia Unirea Brăila =

Association football club in Romania

Dacia Unirea Brăila
- Full name: Asociația Fotbal Club 1919 Dacia Unirea Brăila
- Nicknames: Alb-albaștrii (The White and Blues)
- Short name: Dacia Unirea
- Founded: 15 March 1919; 107 years ago
- Ground: Municipal / Viitorul
- Capacity: 20,154 / 500
- Owners: Brăila County Council
- Chairman: Vasile Popa
- Manager: Marian Samuilă
- League: Liga IV
- 2025–26: Liga III, Seria II, 10th (relegated)
- Website: http://daciaunireabraila.ro/
Home colours	Away colours	Third colours

Asociația Fotbal Club 1919 Dacia Unirea Brăila, commonly known as Dacia Unirea Brăila, is a Romanian football club based in the city of Brăila, Brăila County, which competes in the Liga IV.

Founded in 1919, among the team's best performances are a sixth-place top division finish in the 1991–92 season and having reached a Cupa României final the following campaign.

The players of Dacia Unirea are nicknamed "the White and Blues" or "the Lions of Cosmoc" (Leii lui Cosmoc), and their home games have been hosted by the Stadionul Municipal since 1974. The club's most notable rivalry is the one against Oțelul Galați.

== History ==
=== Early years of football (1919–1950) ===
Dacia Brăila was founded in 1919 around the same time as another local team, Unirea. Until 1928, when the two clubs merged to form Dacia Unirea, each competed separately in the regional championship.

In November 1929 Dacia Unirea had the following base team: Padimatopol (Căpreanu), Stanciu, Vasiliu, Leo (Săvulescu), Fritz, Grigoriou, Anastasios, Leșu, I. Goldenberg, Teodorescu (Frătescu, Cavada, Geller, Munteanu). In the 1929–30 season the team won the regional tournament and qualified for the national championship tournament. In the quarter-finals they were eliminated by Juventus București, the team that won the championship that year.

Dacia Unirea later played in Divizia B between 1934–1937 and 1938–1940, and in Divizia A in 1937–38 and 1940–41. During this period, the club underwent several name changes: DUIG (Dacia Unirea Ignatz Goldenberg) in 1937, Dacia Unirea in 1938, and FC Brăila in 1940. During the war, the team competed in the Cupa Eroilor. After the war, it reverted to its traditional name Dacia Unirea, participating for one season in Divizia C in 1946–47 before disappearing from all divisional levels. Some notable players from this era include I. Goldenberg, N. Stanciu, Hagiopol, Saramet, Weiss, Cavadia, Bonațiu, V. Pop, Negrescu, Drăghicescu, Pascalide, and D. Stanciu.

=== Hard times (1950–1965) ===
After the nationalization of 1948, Întreprinderile Metalurgice Dunărene (lit. 'Danube Metallurgical Enterprises') of David Goldenberg, which had supported Dacia Unirea since the interwar period, became state-owned, and the football club was re‑established in 1950 as Metalul Brăila, and over the following years went through several administrative and name changes.

In the 1950 season, Metalul Brăila won the Brăila County Championship and qualified for the South Sector promotion play-off, defeating, one by one, Spartac Călărași, Spartac Buzău, and Locomotiva PCA Constanța before losing the final to Steagul Roșu Orașul Stalin.

The following year, Metalul claimed the Galați Regional Championship after the teams from the former Brăila County were included in the Galați Region following the administrative and territorial reorganization of the country at the end of 1950. However, after defeating CSA Tecuci in the second round, the team lost promotion to Flamura Roșie Bacău in a three-match series (0–2, 2–0, 1–2).

In the 1952 season, Metalul again won the Galați Regional Championship, eliminating Dinamo Bârlad and Locomotiva Pașcani, but lost in the third round to Dinamo Bacău after another three-match series. At the end of the season, however, the Romanian Football Federation decided to increase the number of promoted teams, as the two series of Divizia B were expanded from 12 to 16 clubs, and the third-round losers were also promoted.

Thus, Metalul entered Divizia B, competing in Series I in the 1953 season, where it finished last but avoided relegation due to another expansion of the second division. In the 1954 season, Metalul was assigned to Series III, once again finishing in last place and being relegated to the regional championship.

After the 1955 campaign, the team returned to the newly re-established Divizia C, ranking 11th in Series II at the end of the 1956 season and subsequently ceding its place in the third division to Dinamo Brăila.

Following another name change, this time to Industria Sârmei Brăila, the club won the 1957–58 Galați Regional Championship and earned promotion to Divizia C, where it finished 4th in Series II during the 1958–59 season before returning once again to the regional championship due to Divizia C being shut down.

Renamed CSM Brăila (Club Sportiv Muncitoresc Brăila – Brăila Workers’ Sports Club) in 1959, the team finished 1st in Series II, winning the 1959–60 Galați Regional Championship after defeating Știința Galați in the final (1–1 away, 3–1 at home), and subsequently earned promotion to Divizia B by winning Group IV of the promotion play-off tournament held in Bucharest, ahead of Steaua Roșie Bacău, Penicilina Iași, and Unirea Botoșani. The squad included Lungu, Bălan, Broscățeanu, Vasilache, Popescu, Boboc, Leșu, Gh. Vasile, Bogdan, Coteț, and Novac.

In Divizia B, CSM Brăila competed in Series I, finishing 6th at the end of the 1960–61 season. After being taken over by the municipality and renamed CSO Brăila (Club Sportiv Orășenesc Brăila), the club was ranked 7th in the 1961–62 season.

In 1962, the club became Progresul Brăila, finishing 11th in the 1962–63 season. Although initially set to be relegated to the newly re-founded Divizia C, the team was instead demoted to the regional championship due to a match-fixing scandal.

In 1963, Laminorul Brăila, the team of the local metallurgical enterprise, earned promotion to Divizia C and was subsequently merged into Progresul, competing in the 1963–64 season under the name Laminorul, winning Series I of the third division and securing promotion to Divizia B. After changing its name to Constructorul Brăila in 1964, the club finished 6th in Series I of Divizia B in the 1964–65 season.

=== Dacia Unirea, ascension (1965–1994) ===
Constructorul continued to compete in Series I of the second division, and after a poor run of results, coach Alexandru Dumitriu was replaced by Nicolae Stanciu in the first half of the season, while the club was renamed Progresul Brăila during the winter break, eventually finishing 6th in the 1965–66 campaign. This was followed by an unexpected relegation at the end of the 1966–67 season, after finishing in 13th place under Ion Broscățeanu. Nevertheless, Progresul managed to reach the Round of 32 in the Cupa României, where it lost 0–1 to Rapid București.

In the 1967–68 season, Progresul finished as runners‑up in the South Series of Divizia C and returned to Divizia B after topping Group I in the promotion/relegation play‑offs held in Brașov, ahead of Chimia Râmnicu Vâlcea, Gloria Bârlad, and Victoria Roman. The squad, led by coach Angelo Economu, comprised Rădoi, State, Buterez, Teodorescu, Cazan, Iuhasz, Gheorghiță, Ionescu, Urmeș, Balaban, Turcu, Iancu, Ciupitu, Oprea, and Stoian. Progresul also reached the Round of 32 of the Cupa României for the second consecutive year, this time losing 1–4 to Dinamo Bacău.

The team that succeeded to bring Brăila back to the Divizia A, after half a century, in 1990, had the following players:I. Dinu, C Brătianu, V. Brătianu, V. Darie, Gh. Negoiță, Cristea Rusu, M. Sandu, M. Anton, A. Marin, Muscă, N. Pascu, M. Petrache, N. Rădulescu, A. Stamate, Titirișcă, Cujbă, Drăgoi, E. Popescu, Vio. Radu, M. Săvescu, M. Ivan. Coach: Bujor Hălmageanu.

In the 1992–93 season the team qualified in the Cupa României final (its best performance so far), coach Ioan Sdrobiș (who came at half season to replace Gheorghe Mulțescu) had at his service the following players: C. Brătianu I, Hăisan, Nicoloff – G. Baciu, Adrian Baldovin, Vasile Brătianu, Vasile Darie, Gh. Negoiță, Tudorel Pelin, Sandu Minciu – Burleanu, Drăgoi, Jica, M. Lazăr, Matincă, Măstăcan, M. Petrache, Titirișcă – Cujbă, Dochia, C. Luca, Marcadonatu, Mașcu, Arben Minga, Marius Șumudică. Coaches who were in charge of the team worth mentioning: I. Economu, Viorel Mateianu, Ionel Iuga, Dumitru Nicolae "Nicușor", C. Oțet, Dumitru Dumitriu III, V. Dridea II. Special merits go to committed chairmen who obtained great results in charge of the club, especially to Octavian Ulman.

=== Decline of football (1994–2006) ===
Four years after the relegations from the Divizia A came that from the Divizia B (in 1999), the tear between the club and Insula Mare a Brăilei (its main sponsor) having disastrous consequences. Actually, prior to that, the main event that triggered the fall happened during the 1994–95 season. Fighting at the time with Selena Bacău for the promotion to the Divizia A, the team from Brăila was stopped by a corruption case at a game with FC Politehnica Iaşi, in which, in exchange for a sum of money, the team from Dealul Copoului should have conceded the game. The case was highly mediated, ending up with arrests, Ilie Trifina (Dacia Unirea's competition organiser) and Leonard Cănănău (journalist from Iași, ex football player). Dacia Unirea ended up with an 8-point penalty, and being forbidden to participate at the qualification knock-out for the promotion to the Divizia A. The team succeeded to make a comeback to the Divizia B in 2001.

=== Reformation (2006–2015) ===
At the end of the 2006–07 CF Brăila was relegated to the Liga III. Their best performance during this period was the acceding to the Cupa României quarter-finals in the 2004–2005 season, where they lost to Dinamo București 1–0 at Stadionul Dinamo and 2–0 at Stadionul Municipal. In the round of 32, Dacia Unirea won against Rapid București (coached at the time by Răzvan Lucescu) at Stadionul Municipal, goal scored by Romeo Buteseacă and in the round of 16, they passed by Unirea Alba Iulia with 2–0, goals scored by Romeo Buteseacă and Cristian Dicu. Players who had a great contribution to this performance, among others, are: Marius Mindileac, Iulian Olteanu;– Laurențiu Ivan, Gheorghe Rădulescu, Valentin Stan, Victor Olenic, Tudorel Pelin, Nicolae Ciocea – Daniel Pleșa, Dumitru Horovei, Mihalache Basalîc, Cristian Dicu;– Romeo Buteseacă, Marius Matei, Paul Sorin Bogdan. We also have to mention Bănel Nicoliță, who played at Dacia Unirea until 2004 and where he made his debut.

The 2008–09 brought significant reorganisation, as the construction company Concivia became the owner of the club and appointed Mihai Ciobanu as head coach, with the objective of promotion to Liga II. However, due to poor results, Ciobanu was dismissed and replaced by Vasile Darie, who ultimately led the White and Blues to an 8th-place finish in Series II.

The 2009–10 campaign began with high expectations. During the summer, Gheorghe Mulțescu was appointed as an advisor on transfers, while several promising players were signed. At the halfway point of the season, Brăila was at the top of the table, competing with Politehnica Iași II, Petrotub Roman and Panciu for promotion. Vasile Darie was replaced mid-season by Daniel Timofte, and the team went on to win Series I and secure promotion to Liga II. Additionally, Nelu Bucă finished as the league’s top goalscorer with 25 goals. The squad comprised Mitrea, Anton, Botaș, Moldoveanu, Șerban, Gurguiatu, Bosoi, Necoară, Nicolae, Oprea, Stănciulescu, Pânzaru, Stăncioiu, Gh. Badea, Iosofache, Pascu, V. Gheorghe, Olenic, C. Tudor, Pungă, Cazan, Mustață, Bălan, Techiu, N. Bucă, Lupu, Panait, Ndigwe and Emekwue.

Brăila started poorly the 2010–11 season, by being eliminated from the Cupa României in the Fourth Round by Unirea Slobozia and by being last in the championship after five rounds, with only one point. After round five of the championship, Gheorghe Bunea Stancu replaced Daniel Timofte with Liviu Ciobotariu., but brought Timofte back after round 10 of the championship, after the disaster at Piatra Neamţ, 0–4 with Ceahlăul, thus concluding Ciobotariu's charge in front of our club, and like Timofte, with only one point obtained in five matches. Timofte's return had no success, the club ranking last at the end of the first half of the championship, with only four points in 15 rounds.

The second half of the championship was more productive, CF Brăila managing to raise 17 more points, totaling 21 in the end, but not enough to avoid relegation, finishing next to last in the series. But all was not lost, because Unirea Urziceni withdrew from the 2011–12 Liga II season, this meaning that our club could play in its place.

CF Brăila had an excellent run in the first half of the 2011–12 Liga II, ranking 5th during the winter brake, just three points behind the second-placed team, Săgeata Năvodari. It finished 6th at the end of the championship.

=== Return to Dacia Unirea name (2015–present) ===
In 2015, the club decided to return to its first name, Dacia Unirea.

== Stadium ==
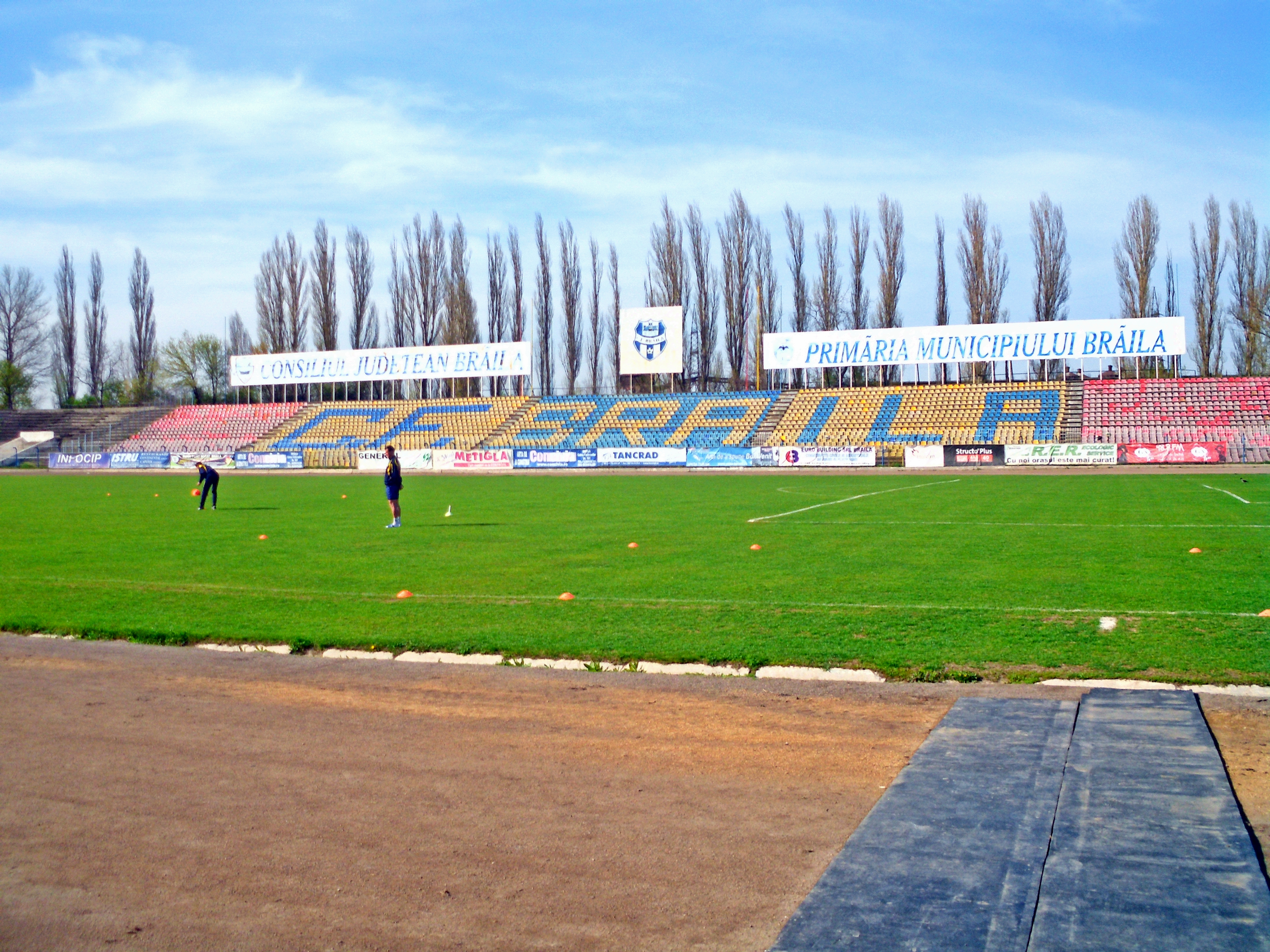
Dacia Unirea's stadium in 2015

Over time, Dacia Unirea Brăila has played its home matches at several stadiums, including Vasile Roaită, a small venue with a single stand located on the current site of the Municipal Stadium. In 1970, the team moved to the newly inaugurated Progresul Stadium after Vasile Roaită was demolished to make way for the Municipal Stadium, which officially opened on 21 August 1974 with an original capacity of 30,000 on benches. A general renovation in 2008 installed seats, reducing the capacity to 20,154.

Due to the deteriorating pitch and facilities of the Municipal Stadium, Dacia Unirea has played home matches at several venues in Brăila County, including the Orășenesc Stadium in Însurăței, and since 2025 at the Sports Base in Lacul Sărat Resort, Chiscani commune, near Brăila, which has a capacity of 500.

Chronology of names
Period	Name
1919–1928	Dacia Brăila
1928–1936	Dacia Unirea Brăila
1936–1938	Dacia Unirea Ignatz Goldenberg Brăila
1938–1939	Dacia Unirea Brăila
1939–1944	FC Brăila
1946–1947	Dacia Unirea Brăila
1950–1955	Metalul Brăila
1955–1956	Energia Brăila
1957–1959	Industria Sârmei Brăila
1959–1961	CSM Brăila
1961–1962	CSO Brăila
1962–1963	Progresul Brăila
1963–1964	Laminorul Brăila
1964–1965	Constructorul Brăila
1965–1975	Progresul Brăila
1975–1980	FC Brăila
1980–1991	FCM Progresul Brăila
1991–2006	Dacia Unirea Brăila
2006–2015	CF Brăila
2015–present	Dacia Unirea Brăila

== Honours ==
=== Leagues ===
- Liga II
  - Winners (2): 1934–35, 1989–90
  - Runners-up (6): 1935–36, 1974–75, 1975–76, 1988–89, 1994–95, 1995–96
- Liga III
  - Winners (3): 1963–64, 2000–01, 2009–10
  - Runners-up (3): 1957–58, 1967–68, 2020–21

=== Cups ===
- Cupa României
  - Runners-up (1): 1992–93

== European record ==
Competition	S	P	W	D	L	GF	GA	GD
Balkans Cup	1	2	0	1	1	1	2	– 1
Total	1	2	0	1	1	1	2	– 1

== Players ==
=== First team squad ===
As of 10 September 2024

Note: Flags indicate national team as defined under FIFA eligibility rules; some limited exceptions apply. Players may hold more than one non-FIFA nationality.

No.	Pos.	Nation	Player
1	GK	ROU	David Ochiană
2	DF	ROU	Răzvan Nichifor
3	DF	ROU	Cezar Petre
4	DF	NGR	Wilson Igwe
5	MF	ROU	Alexandru Luca
6	DF	NGR	Godwin Udoka
7	MF	ROU	Sebastian Răileanu
8	FW	NGR	Leo Ezekiel
9	MF	ROU	Alexandru Duțu (Vice-Captain)
10	MF	ROU	Vasile Priboi
11	MF	ROU	Iulian Oniciu
12	GK	NGR	Jacob Abah
14	MF	ROU	Ștefăniță Sava (Captain)

No.	Pos.	Nation	Player
15	MF	CIV	Atche Eloh
16	DF	ROU	Luis Boroditenco
17	MF	ROU	Alin Simion
18	FW	TUR	Altay Kayalık
19	FW	NGR	Dedan Koko
20	FW	ROU	Nicholas Bizeta
21	MF	ROU	Andrei Stoian
22	MF	ROU	David Condruz
24	MF	ROU	Robert Dragomir
25	MF	ROU	Sebastian Turcu
27	FW	ROU	Adrian Ghiță
33	GK	ROU	Sebastian Butunoiu
37	MF	ROU	Marius Bașturea

=== Out on loan ===
Note: Flags indicate national team as defined under FIFA eligibility rules; some limited exceptions apply. Players may hold more than one non-FIFA nationality.

No. / Pos. / Nation / Player	No. / Pos. / Nation / Player

== Club officials ==
=== Board of directors ===
Role	Name
Owner	(Romania) Brăila County Council
President	(Romania) Vasile Popa
Vice-president	(Romania) Valentin Avramescu
Secretary	(Romania) Gabriel Mărgineanu
Head of Youth Center	(Romania) Vasile Darie
Team manager	(Romania) Ilie Trifina

=== Current technical staff ===
Role	Name
Manager	(Romania) Marian Samuilă
Assistant manager	(Romania) Edgar Marcu
Goalkeeping coach	(Romania) Ștefan Nicolof

== League and cup history ==
Season	Tier	Division	Place	Notes	Cupa României
2026–27	4	Liga IV	TBD		
2025–26	3	Liga III (Seria II)	10th	Relegated	
2024–25	3	Liga III (Seria II)	9th	Spared from (R)	
2023–24	3	Liga III (Seria II)	6th		
2022–23	3	Liga III (Seria II)	10th		
2021–22	2	Liga II	19th	Relegated	
2020–21	3	Liga III (Seria II)	2nd	Promoted	
2019–20	3	Liga III (Seria II)	14th		
2018–19	2	Liga II	20th	Relegated	Round of 32
2017–18	2	Liga II	15th		Round of 32
2016–17	2	Liga II	11th		Round of 16
2015–16	2	Liga II (Seria I)	3rd		Round of 32
2014–15	2	Liga II (Seria I)	6th		Round of 32
2013–14	2	Liga II (Seria I)	7th		
2012–13	2	Liga II (Seria I)	5th		Round of 16
2011–12	2	Liga II (Seria I)	6th		Round of 32
2010–11	2	Liga II (Seria I)	15th		
2009–10	3	Liga III (Seria I)	1st (C)	Promoted	
2008–09	3	Liga III (Seria II)	8th		

Season	Tier	Division	Place	Notes	Cupa României
2007–08	3	Liga III (Seria I)	9th		
2006–07	2	Liga II (Seria I)	18th	Relegated	
2005–06	2	Divizia B (Seria I)	7th		
2004–05	2	Divizia B (Seria I)	4th		Quarter-finals
2003–04	2	Divizia B (Seria I)	3rd		
2002–03	2	Divizia B (Seria I)	8th		
2001–02	2	Divizia B (Seria I)	12th		
2000–01	3	Divizia C	1st (C)	Promoted	Round of 32
1999–00	3	Divizia C	10th		
1998–99	2	Divizia B (Seria I)	18th	Relegated	
1997–98	2	Divizia B (Seria I)	13th		
1996–97	2	Divizia B (Seria I)	3rd		
1995–96	2	Divizia B (Seria I)	2nd		
1994–95	2	Divizia B (Seria I)	2nd		Round of 32
1993–94	1	Divizia A	18th	Relegated	Round of 16
1992–93	1	Divizia A	14th		Final
1991–92	1	Divizia A	6th		Quarter-finals
1990–91	1	Divizia A	13th		Round of 32
1989–90	2	Divizia B (Seria I)	1st (C)	Promoted	

Statistics

Up to and including the end of the 2012–13 season

	Pts	Pld	W	D	L	GF	GA
In Liga I (6 seasons)	138	178	54	30	94	193	328
In Liga II (49 seasons)	1476	1464	631	262	581	2081	1912
In Liga III (11 seasons)	378	296	165	48	83	602	316

== Former managers ==
- (Romania) Franz Platko (1937)
- (Romania) Octavian Popescu (1973–1974)
- (Romania) Titus Ozon (1975–1976)
- (Romania) Nicolae Tătaru (1976–1977)
- (Romania) Robert Cosmoc (1977–1978)
- (Romania) Robert Cosmoc (1980–1981)
- (Romania) Robert Cosmoc (1982–1983)
- (Romania) Francisc Zavoda (1983)
- (Romania) Viorel Mateianu (1983–1984)
- (Romania) Robert Cosmoc (1987–1988)
- (Romania) Mircea Dridea (1988)
- (Romania) Ioan Sdrobiș (1988–1989)
- (Romania) Constantin Oțet (1990)
- (Romania) Dumitru Nicolae (1991)
- (Romania) Vasile Simionaș (1991)
- (Romania) Gheorghe Mulțescu (1992–1993)
- (Romania) Ioan Sdrobiș (1993–1994)
- (Romania) Bujor Hălmăgeanu (1994)
- (Romania) Virgil Dridea (1994–1995)
- (Romania) Ionel Augustin (2002–2003)
- (Romania) Ion Gigi (2003–2004)
- (Romania) Imilian Șerbănică (2005–2006)
- (Romania) Mihai Ciobanu (2008–2009)
- (Romania) Vasile Darie (2009)
- (Romania) Daniel Timofte (2010)
- (Romania) Liviu Ciobotariu (2010)
- (Romania) Daniel Timofte (2010–2011)
- (Romania) Viorel Ion (2011–2012)
- (Romania) Alin Pânzaru (2012–2018)
- (Romania) Florentin Petre (2018–2021)
- (Romania) Laurențiu Ivan (2021–2022)
- (Romania) Vasile Coteț
- (Romania) Petre Iancu
- (Romania) Marian Oprea
- (Romania) Ionel Iuga
- (Romania) Vasile Grosu
- (Romania) Eugen Tudose
- (Romania) Pavel Buburuz
