= Vaslui Municipal Stadium =

Romanian stadium

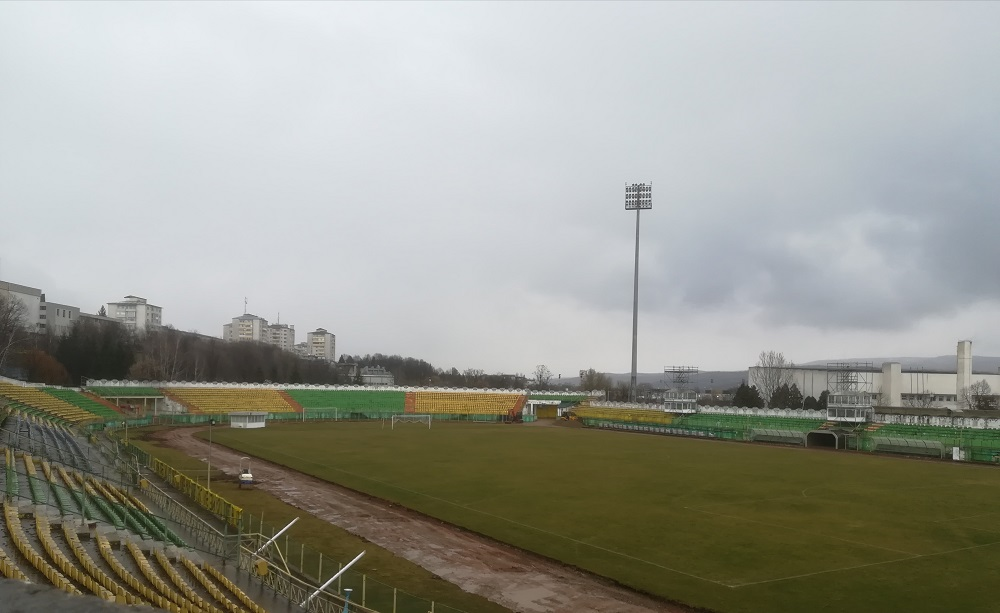
- Interactive map of Vaslui Municipal Stadium
- Location: Vaslui, Romania
- Coordinates: 46°38′00.60″N 27°43′59.95″E
- Owner: Vaslui Municipality
- Operator: CSM Vaslui; Sporting Vaslui
- Capacity: 9,240
- Surface: Grass

Construction
- Opened: 1972
- Renovated: 2005

Tenants
- Sporting Vaslui (2002–present); CSM Vaslui (2018–present)

The Vaslui Municipal Stadium is a multi-purpose stadium in Vaslui, Romania. It is used mostly for football matches and is the home ground of CSM Vaslui and Sporting Vaslui. The stadium has 9,240 seats, and it is covered by natural grass. The floodlighting system, with a density of 2000 lux, has been inaugurated in 2008.

== See also ==
- List of football stadiums in Romania
