= Ioan Sdrobiș =

Romanian football manager (1946–2025)

Personal information
- Date of birth: 9 March 1946
- Place of birth: Bacău, Romania
- Date of death: 8 December 2025 (aged 79)
- Place of death: Târgu Ocna, Romania

Managerial career
- Years: Team
- 1985–1988: Oțelul Galați (assistant)
- 1988: Oțelul Galați
- 1991–1992: Universitatea Cluj
- 1992: Ceahlăul Piatra Neamț
- 1993: Selena Bacău
- 1993–1994: Dacia Unirea Brăila
- 1994: Oțelul Galați
- 1995: Maramureș Baia Mare
- 1996–1997: Extensiv Craiova
- 1997: CSM Reșița
- 1998: Maramureș Baia Mare
- 1998: CSM Reșița
- 1999: Diplomatic Focșani
- 2000: Midia Năvodari
- 2000–2001: Jiul Petroșani
- 2002: FC Vaslui
- 2004: FC Vaslui
- 2006: CFR Timișoara
- 2007–2008: Jiul Petroșani
- 2008–2009: Aerostar Bacău
- 2009: FC Vaslui (technical director)
- 2010–2011: Farul Constanța
- 2012–2014: Dinamo Onești

Ioan Sdrobiș (9 March 1946 – 8 December 2025) was a Romanian football manager.

== Career ==
Sdrobiș was born on 9 March 1946 in Bacău, Romania. He began coaching by working as the assistant of Constantin Rădulescu at Oțelul Galați, helping the team gain promotion to Divizia A and then earn a UEFA Cup place at the end of the 1987–88 season. Subsequently, Rădulescu left the team, and Cornel Dinu became head coach. However, due to a poor start in the 1988–89 season, Sdrobiș was called back to replace Dinu as Oțelul's head coach. During his career, he coached numerous Romanian clubs such as Universitatea Cluj, Ceahlăul Piatra Neamț, Selena Bacău, Dacia Unirea Brăila, Maramureș Baia Mare, Extensiv Craiova, CSM Reșița, Diplomatic Focșani, Midia Năvodari, Jiul Petroșani, FC Vaslui, CFR Timișoara, Aerostar Bacău, Farul Constanța and Dinamo Onești. At some of these clubs, he had multiple tenures. Notably, he led Dacia Unirea Brăila to the 1993 Cupa României final, where they were defeated 2–0 by Universitatea Craiova. Other achievements include helping Universitatea Cluj gain promotion from Divizia B to Divizia A during the 1991–92 season and guiding Diplomatic Focșani to a step up from Divizia C to Divizia B in the 1998–99 season.

Sdrobiș was known to help teams avoid relegation and promote young players, which earned him the nickname "Părintele" (The Father). The most notable player Sdrobiș promoted was Cristian Chivu, when he handed the 16-year-old his debut in a Divizia A match during Sdrobiș's tenure at CSM Reșița in 1997. Later that year, he made Chivu the team's captain, despite the player's youth.

Sdrobiș was also known for his feud with Mircea Lucescu. His first clash with Lucescu took place in June 1987 during Sdrobiș's tenure as an assistant coach at Oțelul Galați and Lucescu's tenure as the head coach of Dinamo București. Sdrobiș claimed that before the match, Lucescu came to Oțelul's locker room and told them how the match should finish and how many goals should be scored so that Rodion Cămătaru would win the European Golden Shoe. The match ended in a 3–3 draw with Cămătaru netting a hat-trick. The second clash took place in November 1997, when Lucescu's Rapid București defeated CSM Reșița 6–1, which was led by Sdrobiș. After the match, Sdrobiș accused Lucescu of paying six of his players to underperform intentionally.

== Death ==
Sdrobiș died on 8 December 2025 at the age of 79 in his home in Târgu Ocna, Romania.

== Publication ==
- Sdrobiș, Ioan (1994). Fotbalul, viața și suferințele mele (in Romanian). Editura Porto-Franco. OCLC 895626656.

== Honours ==
Universitatea Cluj

- Divizia B: 1991–92

Dacia Unirea Brăila

- Cupa României runner-up: 1992–93

Diplomatic Focșani

- Divizia C: 1998–99
