= 2019 Cupa României =

Romanian national rugby union cup competition

- Countries: Romania
- Date: 10 August 2019 – 30 November 2019
- Champions: CSA Steaua București (15th title)
- Runners-up: Timișoara Saracens

Official website
- www.super-liga.ro

The 2019 Cupa României was the 115th season of Romania's national rugby union cup competition, reserved for club teams participating in the CEC Bank SuperLiga. Starting with this edition the number of participating teams has decreased to seven, due to CSM București dissolving before the start of the new season meaning all of CSM's matches are to be cancelled.

== Teams ==
Location of clubs in the 2019 Cupa României.

Club	City/County	Stadium	Capacity	Head Coach	Captain
Timișoara Saracens SCM UVT	Timișoara, Timiș	Stadionul Gheorghe Rășcanu; Stadionul Dan Păltinișanu	1,000; 32,972	(New Zealand) Sosene Anesi	(Romania) Eugen Căpățână
CS Universitatea Cluj-Napoca	Cluj-Napoca, Cluj	Iuliu Hațieganu; Cluj Arena	1,000; 31,479	(Romania) Horea Hîmpea	(Romania) Vlad Rotar
CSA Steaua București	București	Stadionul Ghencea II	3,000	(Romania) Dănuț Dumbravă	(Romania) Viorel Lucaci
CS Dinamo București	București	Stadionul Florea Dumitrache	1,500	(Romania) Cosmin Rațiu	(Romania) Tudorel Bratu
CSM București	București	Stadionul Olimpia	1,000	(Georgia (country)) Lasha Tavartkiladze	(Romania) Adrian Ion
CSM Știința Baia Mare	Baia Mare, Maramureș	Stadionul Lascăr Ghineț (Arena Zimbrilor)	1,000	(Romania) Eugen Apjok	(Romania) Marius Dănilă
ACS Tomitanii Constanța	Constanța, Constanța	Stadionul Mihai Naca	1,000	(Romania) George Sava	(Romania) Adrian Ion
SCM Gloria Buzău	Buzău, Buzău	Stadionul Prințul Șerban Ghica	1,000	(Romania) Mugur Preda	(South Africa) Marco Fuhri

== Groups ==
These are the regular season group classifications:

Key to colours
Advances to the finals.

Group A
	Club	Played	Won	Drawn	Lost	Points for	Points against	Points difference	Bonus points	Points
1	Timișoara Saracens	6	5	1	0	321	39	+282	4	26
2	Știința Baia Mare	6	4	1	1	128	64	+64	3	21
3	Universitatea Cluj	6	1	0	5	62	187	-125	1	5
4	Tomitanii Constanța	6	1	0	5	57	278	-221	1	5

Group B
	Club	Played	Won	Drawn	Lost	Points for	Points against	Points difference	Bonus points	Points
1	Steaua București	4	4	0	0	124	69	+55	4	20
2	Gloria Buzău	4	1	0	3	102	109	-7	2	6
3	Dinamo București	4	1	0	3	68	116	-48	1	5
4	CSM București	0	0	0	0	0	0	0	0	0

- Note - CSM București have withdrawn from the competition before the 2019 Cupa României started so all of their matches will be cancelled.

== Fixtures & Results of Group A ==
=== Round 1 ===
10 August 2019
11:00 EET (UTC+2)

CSM Baia Mare	5-0 (Forfeited)	ACS Tomitanii Constanța

Stadionul Lascăr Ghineț

10 August 2019
11:00 EET (UTC+2)

CS Universitatea Cluj-Napoca	3-40	Timișoara Saracens (TBP)

Stadionul Iuliu Hațieganu

=== Round 2 ===
17 August 2019
11:00 EET (UTC+2)

CSM Baia Mare (LBP)	17-22	Timișoara Saracens

Stadionul Lascăr Ghineț

25 September 2019
10:00 EET (UTC+2)

ACS Tomitanii Constanța	29-28	CS Universitatea Cluj-Napoca (LBP)

Stadionul Mihai Naca

=== Round 3 ===
24 August 2019
11:00 EET (UTC+2)

Timișoara Saracens (TBP)	75-6	ACS Tomitanii Constanța

Stadionul Gheorghe Rășcanu

24 August 2019
18:00 EET (UTC+2)

CS Universitatea Cluj-Napoca	17-43	CSM Baia Mare (TBP)

Stadionul Iuliu Hațieganu

=== Round 4 ===
30 October 2019
11:00 EET (UTC+2)

ACS Tomitanii Constanța	19-52	CSM Baia Mare (TBP)

Stadionul Mihai Naca

2 November 2019
15:00 EET (UTC+2)

Timișoara Saracens (TBP)	67-7	CS Universitatea Cluj-Napoca

Stadionul Dan Păltinișanu

=== Round 5 ===
9 November 2019
11:00 EET (UTC+2)

CS Universitatea Cluj-Napoca	7-3	ACS Tomitanii Constanța (LBP)

Stadionul Iuliu Hațieganu

9 November 2019
11:00 EET (UTC+2)

Timișoara Saracens	6-6	CSM Baia Mare

Stadionul Gheorghe Rășcanu

=== Round 6 ===
23 November 2019
11:00 EET (UTC+2)

ACS Tomitanii Constanța	0-111	Timișoara Saracens (TBP)

Stadionul Mihai Naca

23 November 2019
11:00 EET (UTC+2)

CSM Baia Mare	5-0 (Forfeited)	CS Universitatea Cluj-Napoca

Stadionul Lascăr Ghineț

== Fixtures & Results of Group B ==
=== Round 1 ===
10 August 2019
11:00 EET (UTC+2)

CSA Steaua București (TBP)	38-17	SCM Buzău

Stadionul Ghencea II

10 August 2019
11:00 EET (UTC+2)

CSM București	Cancelled	CS Dinamo București

Stadionul Olimpia

=== Round 2 ===
17 August 2019
11:00 EET (UTC+2)

SCM Buzău (TBP)	46-14	CS Dinamo București

Stadionul Prințul Șerban Ghica

17 August 2019
11:00 EET (UTC+2)

CSA Steaua București	Cancelled	CSM București

Stadionul Ghencea II

=== Round 3 ===
24 August 2019
11:00 EET (UTC+2)

CSM București	Cancelled	SCM Buzău

Stadionul Olimpia

24 August 2019
11:00 EET (UTC+2)

CS Dinamo București	16-28	CSA Steaua București (TBP)

Stadionul Florea Dumitrache

=== Round 4 ===
2 November 2019
11:00 EET (UTC+2)

SCM Buzău	19-36	CSA Steaua București (TBP)

Stadionul Prințul Șerban Ghica

2 November 2019
11:00 EET (UTC+2)

CS Dinamo București	Cancelled	CSM București

Stadionul Florea Dumitrache

=== Round 5 ===
9 November 2019
11:00 EET (UTC+2)

CSM București	Cancelled	CSA Steaua București

Stadionul Olimpia

9 November 2019
11:00 EET (UTC+2)

CS Dinamo București	21-20	SCM Buzău (LPB)

Stadionul Olimpia
Referee: (Romania)

=== Round 6 ===
16 November 2019
11:00 EET (UTC+2)

SCM Buzău	Cancelled	CSM București

Stadionul Prințul Șerban Ghica

16 November 2019
11:00 EET (UTC+2)

CSA Steaua București (TBP)	22-17	CS Dinamo București (LPB)

Stadionul Ghencea II

== First place final ==
30 November 2019
12:00 EET (UTC+2)

CSA Steaua București	22-19	Timișoara Saracens
Try: Grigoraș Diaconescu; Con: Florin Vlaicu (1); Pen: Florin Vlaicu (5)	SuperLiga Report	Try: Randall Morrison; Con: Luke Samoa (1); Pen: Luke Samoa (4)

Stadionul Noua din Brașov, Brașov
Attendance: 1,000
Referee: Cristian Șerban (Romania)

Team details

LP	1	(Romania) Alexandru Savin
HK	2	(Romania) Tudor Butnariu
TP	3	(Georgia (country)) Nika Pataraia
LL	4	(South Africa) Matthew Tweddle
RL	5	(Romania) Bogdan Doroftei
BF	6	(Romania) Kuselo Moyake
OF	7	(Romania) Dragoș Ser
N8	8	(Fiji) Eseria Vueti (c)
SH	9	(Romania) Grigoraș Diaconescu
FH	10	(Romania) Tudor Boldor
LW	11	(Romania) Ionuț Dumitru
IC	12	(Romania) Florin Vlaicu
OC	13	(Romania) Florin Ioniță
RW	14	(Romania) Alexandru Porojan
FB	15	(Romania) Robert Neagu
Replacements:
HK	16	(Romania) Florin Bârdașu
PR	17	(Romania) Petru Tamba
PR	18	(Romania) Vasile Bălan
BR	19	(Romania) Viorel Lucaci
BR	20	(Romania) Mario Arvinte
SH	21	(Romania) Florin Surugiu
FH	22	(Romania) Daniel Plai
FB	23	(Romania) Lama Sioeli
Coach:
(Romania) Dănuț Dumbravă

LP	1	(Romania) Marius Lungu
HK	2	(Romania) Marian Sabău
TP	3	(Romania) Horațiu Pungea
LL	4	(Romania) Valentin Popârlan (c)
RL	5	(Romania) Dorin Lazăr
BF	6	(Romania) Vlad Neculau
OF	7	(Romania) Vasile Rus
N8	8	(Romania) Randall Morrison
SH	9	(Georgia (country)) Bidzina Shamkharadze
FH	10	(Romania) Ionel Melinte
LW	11	(Tonga) Tevita Manumua
IC	12	(Romania) Florin Popa
OC	13	(Romania) Cătălin Fercu
RW	14	(Romania) Marius Simionescu
FB	15	(Romania) Luke Samoa
Replacements:
HK	16	(Romania) Eugen Căpățână
PR	17	(Tonga) Paea Fonoifua
PR	18	(Tonga) Sione Halalilo
LK	19	(Romania) Ionuț Mureșan
BR	20	(Romania) Damian Strătilă
SH	21	(Romania) Gabriel Rupanu
FH	22	(New Zealand) Hinckley Vaovasa
CE	23	(New Zealand) Moa Mua Maliepo
Coach:
(New Zealand) Sosene Anesi

Touch judges:
Alexandru Ionescu (Romania)
Radu Petrescu (Romania)
