= 2018–19 Divizia Națională de Seniori season =

2018-19 Divizia Națională de Seniori
- Countries: Romania
- Date: 15 September 2018 – 18 May 2019
- Champions: CS Năvodari
- Runners-up: CS Știința Petroșani
- Relegated: ACS Rugby Morometii Turnu Magurele; CS Manaştur; CS Sportul Studentesc București

Official website
- www.super-liga.ro

The 2018–19 Divizia Națională de Seniori is the second premier Romanian rugby competition, reserved for club teams. The number of participating teams is decreased from initially twelve teams to just nine due to ACS Rugby Morometii Turnu Magurele, CS Manaştur and CS Sportul Studentesc București the three teams which had pulled out for financial reasons., with addition of the 2017-18 champions and runners-up of the second tier championship DNS-Divizia Nationala de Seniori. The eventual champions of the Divizia Națională de Seniori have the right to promote up to the SuperLiga with the relegating teams going down to Divizia A, Romania's 3rd level competition.

== Teams ==
=== Group Centre-North ===
Location of clubs in the Divizia Națională de Seniori 2018-2019

Club	City/County	Stadium	Capacity	Head Coach	Captain
CSM Bucovina Suceava	Suceava, Suceava	Stadionul Unirea	7,000	(Romania) Coltuneac Marius	(Romania)
RC Gura Humorului	Gura Humorului, Suceava	Stadionul Tineretului	5,000	(Romania) Andrei Varvaroi	(Romania)
CS Manaştur	Manaştur, Cluj	Stadionul Iuliu Hațieganu	1,000	(Romania) Roman Răzvan	(Romania)
CS Știința Petroșani	Petroșani, Hunedoara	Stadionul Știința	1,000	(Romania) Emil Drumea	(Romania)
CSUAV Arad	Arad, Arad	Stadionul Sanicolau Mic	1,000	(Romania) Marian Grindei	(Romania)
CSM Sibiu	Sibiu, Sibiu	Stadionul Bebe Boboc	500	(Romania) Răzvan Borcan	(Romania)

=== Group Centre-South ===
Location of clubs in the Divizia Națională de Seniori 2018-2019

Club	City/County	Stadium	Capacity	Head Coach	Captain
CS Năvodari	Năvodari, Constanța	Stadionul Flacăra	5,000	(Romania) Cristian Husea	(Romania)
RC Bărlad	Bărlad, Vaslui	Stadionul Rulmentul	2,000	(Romania) Ioan Harnagea	(Romania)
CS Sportul Studențesc București	București	Complexul Cultural Sportiv Studentesc Tei	1,000	(Romania) Constantin Merca	(Romania)
CSM Galați	Galați, Galați	Stadionul Municipal (Galați)	1,000	(Romania) Marius Secuianu	(Romania)
RC Grivița București	București	Stadionul Parcul Copilului	1,000	(Romania) Alexandru Marin	(Romania)
ACS Rugby Morometii Turnu Magurele	Turnu Magurele, Teleorman	Stadionul Botul Calului	500	(Romania) Not known	(Romania) Not known

== Tables ==
This is the regular season league table for Group Centre-North:

Key to colours
Advances to play-offs.
Advances to play-out.
Automatic Relegation.

Regular Table
	Club	Played	Won	Drawn	Lost	Points for	Points against	Points difference	Bonus points	Points
1	CS Știința Petroșani	8	8	0	0	509	91	+418	8	40
2	CSM Bucovina Suceava	8	6	0	2	260	136	+124	6	30
3	RC Gura Humorului	8	4	0	4	167	185	-18	2	18
4	CSUAV Arad	8	2	0	6	125	276	-151	3	11
5	CSM Sibiu	8	0	0	8	107	480	-373	1	1
6	CS Manaştur	0	0	0	0	0	0	0	0	0

This is the regular season league table for Group Centre-South:

Key to colours
Advances to play-offs.
Advances to play-out.
Automatic Relegation.

Regular Table
	Club	Played	Won	Drawn	Lost	Points for	Points against	Points difference	Bonus points	Points
1	CS Năvodari	6	6	0	0	223	41	+182	5	29
2	RC Bărlad	6	2	1	3	123	155	-32	3	13
3	RC Grivița București	6	2	0	4	74	134	-60	1	9
4	CSM Galați	6	1	1	4	89	179	-90	3	7
5	ACS Rugby Morometii Turnu Magurele	0	0	0	0	0	0	0	0	0
5	CS Sportul Studențesc București	0	0	0	0	0	0	0	0	0

== Fixtures & Results ==
=== Round 1 ===
8 September 2018
11:00

Timișoara Saracens (1 BP)	51-6	SCM Buzău

Gheorghe Rășcanu

8 September 2018
11:00

CSM Baia Mare (1 BP)	52–11	ACS Tomitanii Constanța

Lascăr Ghineţ

8 September 2018
11:00

CSA Steaua București (1 BP)	75-15	CS Universitatea Cluj-Napoca

Stadionul Ghencea II

8 September 2018
17:00

CSM București (1 BP)	38-9	CS Dinamo București

Stadionul Olimpia

=== Round 2 ===
15 September 2018
11:00

SCM Buzău (1 BP)	31-13	CS Dinamo București

Prinț Ghică

15 September 2018
11:00

CS Universitatea Cluj-Napoca	13-49	CSM București (1 BP)

Iuliu Hațieganu

15 September 2018
11:00

ACS Tomitanii Constanța	17-48	CSA Steaua București (1 BP)

Mihail Naca

15 September 2018
11:00

Timișoara Saracens (1 BP)	32-26	CSM Baia Mare (1 BP)

Gheorghe Rășcanu

=== Round 3 ===
22 September 2018
11:00

CSM Baia Mare (1 BP)	61-7	SCM Buzău

Lascăr Ghineţ

22 September 2018
11:00

CSM București (1 BP)	50-5	ACS Tomitanii Constanța

Olimpia

22 September 2018
11:00

CS Dinamo București	25-25	CS Universitatea Cluj-Napoca

Floreă Dumitrache

22 September 2018
14:30

CSA Steaua București	16-9	Timișoara Saracens (1 BP)

Stadionul Ghencea II

=== Round 4 ===
29 September 2018
11:00

SCM Buzău	12-7	CS Universitatea Cluj-Napoca (1 BP)

Prinț Ghică

29 September 2018
11:00

Timișoara Saracens	19-16	CSM București (1 BP)

Gheorghe Rășcanu

29 September 2018
11:00

CSM Baia Mare (1 BP)	15-19	CSA Steaua București

Lascăr Ghineţ

29 September 2018
14:30

ACS Tomitanii Constanța	17-13	CS Dinamo București (1 BP)

Mihail Naca

=== Round 5 ===
6 October 2018
11:00

CSA Steaua București (1 BP)	31-10	SCM Buzău

Gheorghe Rășcanu

6 October 2018
11:00

CS Dinamo București	16–33	Timișoara Saracens (1 BP)

Floreă Dumitrache

6 October 2018
11:00

CS Universitatea Cluj-Napoca	9-3	ACS Tomitanii Constanța (1 BP)

Iuliu Hațieganu

6 October 2018
17:00

CSM București	26-14	CSM Baia Mare

Olimpia

=== Round 6 ===
13 October 2018
14:00

CS Dinamo București	15-27	CSA Steaua București (1 BP)

Floreă Dumitrache

13 October 2018
16:00

CS Universitatea Cluj-Napoca	7–42	CSM Baia Mare (1 BP)

Iuliu Hațieganu

27 October 2018
11:00

Timișoara Saracens	38-0	ACS Tomitanii Constanța

Gheorghe Rășcanu

27 October 2018
13:00

CSM București (1 BP)	40-14	SCM Buzău

Olimpia

=== Round 7 ===
20 October 2018
11:00

CS Dinamo București	17-53	CSM Baia Mare (1 BP)

Floreă Dumitrache

20 October 2018
12:00

SCM Buzău	20–6	ACS Tomitanii Constanța

Prinț Ghică

20 October 2018
14:30

CSA Steaua București (1 BP)	13-20	CSM București

Stadionul Ghencea II

9 March 2018
11:00

Timișoara Saracens(1 BP)	56-23	CS Universitatea Cluj-Napoca

Dan Păltinișanu

=== Round 8 ===
16 March 2019
10:00

SCM Buzău (1 BP)	18-19	Timișoara Saracens

Prinț Ghică

30 March 2019
09:00

ACS Tomitanii Constanța	5-49	CSM Baia Mare (1 BP)

Mihail Naca

30 March 2019
09:00

CS Universitatea Cluj-Napoca	18-36	CSA Steaua București (1 BP)

Iuliu Hațieganu

30 March 2019
11:00

CS Dinamo București	22-50	CSM București (1 BP)

Floreă Dumitrache

=== Round 9 ===
6 April 2019
09:00

CSM București	33-8	CS Universitatea Cluj-Napoca

Olimpia

6 April 2019
09:00

CSM Baia Mare	20-16	Timișoara Saracens (1 BP)

Lascăr Ghineţ

6 April 2019
11:00

CS Dinamo București	13-12	SCM Buzău (1 BP)

Floreă Dumitrache

6 April 2019
11:00

CSA Steaua București (1 BP)	52-0	ACS Tomitanii Constanța

Stadionul Ghencea II

=== Round 10 ===
13 April 2019
09:00

SCM Buzău	6-36	CSM Baia Mare

Prinț Ghică

13 April 2019
09:00

Timișoara Saracens (1 BP)	27-17	CSA Steaua București

Dan Păltinișanu

13 April 2019
09:00

ACS Tomitanii Constanța	8-39	CSM București

Mihail Naca

13 April 2019
09:00

CS Universitatea Cluj-Napoca	13-24	CS Dinamo București

Iuliu Hațieganu

=== Round 11 ===
20 April 2019
09:00

CS Universitatea Cluj-Napoca	26-16	SCM Buzău

Iuliu Hațieganu

20 April 2019
09:00

CS Dinamo București (1 BP)	25-27	ACS Tomitanii Constanța

Floreă Dumitrache

20 April 2019
09:00

CSA Steaua București	13-13	CSM Baia Mare

Stadionul Ghencea II

1 May 2019
09:00

CSM București	21-16	Timișoara Saracens (1 BP)

Olimpia

=== Round 12 ===
25 April 2019
09:00

ACS Tomitanii Constanța (1 BP)	35-30	CS Universitatea Cluj-Napoca

Mihail Naca

26 April 2019
09:00

SCM Buzău	16-31	CSA Steaua București (1 BP)

Prinț Ghică

26 April 2019
09:00

CSM Baia Mare (1 BP)	31-19	CSM București

Lascăr Ghineţ

26 April 2019
09:00

Timișoara Saracens (1 BP)	36-14	CS Dinamo București

Dan Păltinișanu

=== Round 13 ===
4 May 2019
12:00

SCM Buzău	14-33	CSM București (1 BP)

Prinț Ghică

4 May 2019
12:00

CSA Steaua București (1 BP)	54-19	CS Dinamo București

Stadionul Ghencea II

4 May 2019
12:00

CSM Baia Mare (1 BP)	31-12	CS Universitatea Cluj-Napoca

Lascăr Ghineţ

4 May 2019
12:00

ACS Tomitanii Constanța	25-26	Timișoara Saracens (1 BP)

Gheorghe Rășcanu

=== Round 14 ===
11 May 2019
12:00

ACS Tomitanii Constanța (1 BP)	20-15	SCM Buzău

Mihail Naca

11 May 2019
12:00

CS Universitatea Cluj-Napoca	22-40	Timișoara Saracens

Iuliu Hațieganu

11 May 2019
12:00

CSM Baia Mare	45-14	CS Dinamo București

Lascăr Ghineţ

11 May 2019
12:00

CSM București	28-12	CSA Steaua București

Olimpia

=== Play-off Semifinals ===
The semi-finals were held on 18 May 2019 12:00 and 14:30 at Olimpia and Dan Păltinișanu respectively.

1	CSM București	17	22	CSA Steaua București
2	Timișoara Saracens	30	35	CSM Știința Baia Mare

Third/Fourth place final

Both finals were held on 25 May 2019, 1 week after the semi-finals at Stadionul Fepa 74.

1	CSM București	20	19	Timișoara Saracens

First / Second place final

1	CSA Steaua București	22	24	CSM Știința Baia Mare

=== Play-out Semifinals ===
The semi-finals were held on 18 May 2019 09:00 at Mihail Naca and Prinț Ghică respectively.

1	ACS Tomitanii Constanța	22	40	CS Universitatea Cluj-Napoca
2	SCM Buzău	11	16	CS Dinamo București

Seventh/Eighth place final

Both finals were held on 26 May 2019, 1 week and 1 day after the semi-finals at Stadionul Olimpia.

1	ACS Tomitanii Constanța	12	14	SCM Buzău

Fifth/Sixth place final

1	CS Universitatea Cluj-Napoca	22	17	CS Dinamo București
