= 2021 SuperLiga season =

2021 CEC Bank SuperLiga
- Countries: Romania
- Date: 24 April 2021 – 16 October 2021
- Champions: CSM Știința Baia Mare (8th title)
- Runners-up: CSA Steaua București
- Matches played: 37
- Tries scored: 285 (average 7.7 per match)
- Top point scorer: (South Africa) Jondre Williams (99 points)
- Top try scorer: (South Africa) De-An Ackermann (11 tries)

Official website
- rugbyromania.ro

The 2021 SuperLiga (also known as the CEC Bank SuperLiga for sponsorship reasons) is the 107th season of premier club rugby in Romania, and the 10th season of the competition under the name of the CEC Bank SuperLiga. Starting with this edition, Gloria Buzău will no longer participate in the SuperLiga due to the dissolvation of the club last year.

== Teams ==
Locations of 2021 CEC Bank SuperLiga teams Romania.

Note: Flags indicate national union as has been defined under WR eligibility rules. Players may hold more than one non-WR nationality

| Team | Manager | Captain | Stadium | Capacity |
|---|---|---|---|---|
| Dinamo București | (New Zealand) Sosene Anesi | (Romania) Alexandru Mitu | Stadionul Florea Dumitrache | 1,500 |
| Steaua București | (Romania) Dănuț Dumbravă | (Fiji) Eseria Vueti | Stadionul Ghencea II | 2,000 |
| Știința Baia Mare | (Romania) Eugen Apjok | (Romania) Marius Dănilă | Arena Zimbrilor | 2,300 |
| Timișoara Rugby | (Romania) Valentin Calafeteanu | (Romania) Eugen Căpățână | Stadionul Gheorghe Rășcanu | 1,000 |
| Tomitanii Constanța | (New Zealand) Tuhakaraina Massey | (Tonga) Cooper Vuna | Stadionul Mihai Naca | 1,000 |
| Universitatea Cluj-Napoca | (Romania) Cristian Săuan | (Romania) Damian Dragoș | Stadionul Iuliu Hațieganu | 1,000 |

== Table ==
This is the regular season league table:

Key to colours
| Advances to semifinals |
| Advances to play-off semifinals |

Regular Table
| | Club | Played | Won | Drawn | Lost | Points for | Points against | Points difference | Bonus points | Points |
| 1 | Steaua București | 10 | 8 | 1 | 1 | 427 | 160 | +267 | 7 | 41 |
| 2 | Știința Baia Mare | 10 | 8 | 0 | 2 | 379 | 196 | +183 | 7 | 39 |
| 3 | Dinamo București | 10 | 6 | 0 | 4 | 392 | 251 | +141 | 7 | 31 |
| 4 | SCM Rugby Timișoara | 10 | 5 | 1 | 4 | 289 | 196 | +93 | 6 | 28 |
| 5 | Universitatea Cluj | 10 | 2 | 0 | 8 | 199 | 446 | -247 | 1 | 9 |
| 6 | Tomitanii Constanța | 10 | 0 | 0 | 10 | 154 | 591 | -437 | 1 | 1 |

== Fixtures & Results ==
=== Round 1 ===
24 April 2021
11:00 EET (UTC+2)

| Steaua București | 38–36 | Dinamo București (LBP) |

Stadionul Ghencea II
Referee: Alexandru Ionescu

24 April 2021
14:00 EET (UTC+2)

| Știința Baia Mare (TBP) | 36–18 | Universitatea Cluj-Napoca |

Arena Zimbrilor
Referee: Vlad Iordăchescu

=== Round 2 ===
30 April 2021
11:00 EET (UTC+2)

| Universitatea Cluj-Napoca | 30–52 | Dinamo București (TBP) |

Stadionul Iuliu Hațieganu
Referee: Robert Diaconescu

30 April 2021
11:00 EET (UTC+2)

| Tomitanii Constanța | 6–46 | Steaua București (TBP) |

Stadionul Mihai Naca
Referee: Mihai Văcaru

1 May 2021
11:00 EET (UTC+2)

| Știința Baia Mare | 29–24 | Rugby Timișoara (LBP) |

Arena Zimbrilor
Referee: Cristian Șerban

=== Round 3 ===
8 May 2021
12:00 EET (UTC+2)

| Rugby Timișoara (TBP) | 59–19 | Universitatea Cluj-Napoca |

Stadionul Gheorghe Rășcanu
Referee: Mihai Văcaru

8 May 2021
12:00 EET (UTC+2)

| Steaua București | 18–17 | Știința Baia Mare (LBP) |

Stadionul Ghencea II
Referee: Robert Diaconescu

8 May 2021
14:00 EET (UTC+2)

| Dinamo București (TBP) | 78–19 | Tomitanii Constanța |

Stadionul Florea Dumitrache
Referee: Virgil Ghenea

=== Round 4 ===
15 May 2021
11:00 EET (UTC+2)

| Știința Baia Mare (TBP) | 46–27 | Dinamo București |

Arena Zimbrilor
Referee: Radu Petrescu

15 May 2021
12:00 EET (UTC+2)

| Rugby Timișoara | 13–13 | Steaua București |

Stadionul Gheorghe Rășcanu
Referee: Alexandru Ionescu

16 May 2021
11:30 EET (UTC+2)

| Universitatea Cluj-Napoca (TBP) | 45–27 | Tomitanii Constanța |

Stadionul Florea Dumitrache
Referee: Vlad Iordăchescu

=== Round 5 ===
22 May 2021
11:00 EET (UTC+2)

| Tomitanii Constanța | 17–80 | Știința Baia Mare (TBP) |

Stadionul Mihai Naca
Referee: Robert Diaconescu

22 May 2021
12:00 EET (UTC+2)

| Dinamo București | 31–28 | Rugby Timișoara (LBP) |

Stadionul Florea Dumitrache
Referee: Cristian Şerban

23 May 2021
11:30 EET (UTC+2)

| Steaua București (TBP) | 55–5 | Universitatea Cluj-Napoca |

Stadionul Ghencea II
Referee: Radu Petrescu

=== Round 6 ===
29 May 2021
12:00 EET (UTC+2)

| Dinamo București | 14–27 | Steaua București (TBP) |

Stadionul Florea Dumitrache
Referee: Vlad Iordăchescu

29 May 2021
14:00 EET (UTC+2)

| Universitatea Cluj-Napoca | 14–46 | Știința Baia Mare (TBP) |

Stadionul Iuliu Hațieganu
Referee: Mihai Văcaru

30 May 2021
16:00 EET (UTC+2)

| Tomitanii Constanța | 12–82 | Rugby Timișoara (TBP) |

Stadionul Mihai Naca
Referee: Viorel-Nicolae Bujoreanu

=== Round 7 ===
5 June 2021
12:00 EET (UTC+2)

| Rugby Timișoara | 28–25 | Știința Baia Mare (LBP) |

Stadionul Gheorghe Rășcanu
Referee: Alexandru Ionescu

5 June 2021
14:00 EET (UTC+2)

| Steaua București (TBP) | 101–26 | Tomitanii Constanța |

Stadionul Ghencea II
Referee: Virgil Ioniță

6 June 2021
11:30 EET (UTC+2)

| Dinamo București (TBP) | 35–20 | Universitatea Cluj-Napoca |

Stadionul Florea Dumitrache
Referee: Radu Petrescu

=== Round 8 ===
12 June 2021
11:00 EET (UTC+2)

| Tomitanii Constanța | 14–71 | Dinamo București (TBP) |

Stadionul Mihai Naca
Referee: Robert Diaconescu

12 June 2021
11:00 EET (UTC+2)

| Știința Baia Mare | 23–18 | Steaua București (LBP) |

Arena Zimbrilor
Referee: Vlad Iordăchescu

=== Round 1 (rescheduled match) ===
10 July 2021
11:00 EET (UTC+2)

| Rugby Timișoara | Cancelled; 5–0 | Tomitanii Constanța |

Stadionul Gheorghe Rășcanu

=== Round 8 (rescheduled match) ===
18 August 2021
11:00 EET (UTC+2)

| Universitatea Cluj-Napoca | 10–33 | Rugby Timișoara (TBP) |

Stadionul Iuliu Hațieganu
Referee: Alexandru Ionescu

=== Round 9 ===
4 September 2021
11:00 EET (UTC+2)

| Tomitanii Constanța (LBP) | 21–28 | Universitatea Cluj-Napoca |

Stadionul Mihai Naca
Referee: Cristian Șerban

4 September 2021
12:00 EET (UTC+2)

| Steaua București (TBP) | 29–10 | Rugby Timișoara |

Stadionul Ghencea II
Referee: Alexandru Ionescu

5 September 2021
11:30 EET (UTC+2)

| Dinamo București | 20–22 | Știința Baia Mare |

Stadionul Florea Dumitrache
Referee: Vlad Iordăchescu

=== Round 10 ===
24 September 2021
12:00 EET (UTC+2)

| Universitatea Cluj-Napoca | 10–82 | Steaua București (TBP) |

Stadionul Steaua
Referee: Vlad Iordăchescu

25 September 2021
11:00 EET (UTC+2)

| Știința Baia Mare (TBP) | 55–12 | Tomitanii Constanța |

Arena Zimbrilor
Referee: Mihai Văcaru

25 September 2021
12:00 EET (UTC+2)

| Rugby Timișoara | 7–28 | Dinamo București (TBP) |

Stadionul Gheorghe Rășcanu
Referee: Alexandru Ionescu

== Play-off semifinals ==
2 October 2021
12:00 EET (UTC+2)

| Dinamo București | 63–17 | Tomitanii Constanța |

Stadionul Florea Dumitrache
Referee: Radu Petrescu

3 October 2021
14:00 EET (UTC+2)

| Rugby Timișoara | 66–0 | Universitatea Cluj-Napoca |

Stadionul Gheorghe Rășcanu
Referee: Robert Diaconescu

== Semifinals ==
8 October 2021
11:00 EET (UTC+2)

| Știința Baia Mare | 32–15 | Dinamo București |

Stadionul Lascăr Ghineţ
Referee: Radu Petrescu

8 October 2021
12:00 EET (UTC+2)

| Steaua București | 22–18 | Rugby Timișoara |

Stadionul Ghencea II
Referee: Alexandru Ionescu

== 5th Place final ==
16 October 2021
11:00 EET (UTC+2)

| Universitatea Cluj-Napoca | 36–24 | Tomitanii Constanța |
| | Report |

Stadionul Iuliu Hațieganu
Attendance: 0
Referee: Mădălin Girbău

== 3rd Place final ==
16 October 2021
12:00 EET (UTC+2)

| Dinamo București | 16–11 | Rugby Timișoara |
| | Report |

Stadionul Arcul de Triumf
Attendance: 0
Referee: Robert Diaconescu

== 1st Place final ==
16 October 2021
17:30 EET (UTC+2)

| Steaua București | 3–11 | Baia Mare |
| | Report |

Stadionul Arcul de Triumf
Attendance: 0
Referee: Cristian Șerban

== Leading scorers ==
Note: Flags to the left of player names indicate national team as has been defined under World Rugby eligibility rules, or primary nationality for players who have not yet earned international senior caps. Players may hold one or more non-WR nationalities.

=== Most points ===
As of 17 October 2021

| Rank | Player | Club | Points |
|---|---|---|---|
| 1 | (South Africa) Jondre Williams | Dinamo București | 99 |
| 2 | (Romania) Daniel Plai | Steaua București | 84 |
| 3 | (Fiji) Taniela Rawaqa | Steaua București | 63 |
| 4 | (Romania) Ionel Melinte | Rugby Timișoara | 58 |
| 5 | (South Africa) De-An Ackermann | Dinamo București | 55 |
| 5 | (Romania) Marian Ispir | Dinamo București | 55 |
| 7 | (Zimbabwe) Ngoni Chibuwe | Steaua București | 50 |
| 7 | (Romania) Ionuț Dumitru | Steaua București | 50 |
| 7 | (South Africa) Damian Bonaparte | Dinamo București | 50 |
| 7 | (Namibia) TC Kisting | Știința Baia Mare | 50 |

=== Most tries ===
As of 17 October 2021

| Rank | Player | Club | Tries |
|---|---|---|---|
| 1 | (South Africa) De-An Ackermann | Dinamo București | 11 |
| 2 | (Zimbabwe) Ngoni Chibuwe | Steaua București | 10 |
| 2 | (Romania) Ionuț Dumitru | Steaua București | 10 |
| 2 | (South Africa) Damian Bonaparte | Dinamo București | 10 |
| 5 | (Tonga) Taliaʻuli Sikuea | Știința Baia Mare | 8 |
| 5 | (Malaysia) Etonia Saukuru | Rugby Timișoara | 8 |
| 7 | (South Africa) Dylan Schwartz | Dinamo București | 7 |
| 7 | (Fiji) Lesunaitait Tiqeiliesa | Rugby Timișoara | 7 |
| 7 | (Romania) Marius Murgoci | Universitatea Cluj-Napoca | 7 |
| 10 | (Romania) Stephen Shennan | Rugby Timișoara | 6 |
