= 2018–19 SuperLiga season =

2018–19 CEC Bank SuperLiga
- Countries: Romania
- Date: 8 September 2018 – 26 May 2019
- Champions: Știința Baia Mare (6th title)
- Runners-up: CSA Steaua București
- Top point scorer: (Romania) Luke Samoa (Timișoara Saracens); 163 points
- Top try scorer: (Tonga) Taliaʻuli Sikuea (CSM Baia Mare); 13 tries

Official website
- www.super-liga.ro

The 2018–19 SuperLiga (also known as the CEC Bank SuperLiga for sponsorship reasons) is the 105th season of premier club rugby in Romania. Starting with this edition the number of participating teams is increased to eight, with addition of the 2017–18 champions and runners-up of the second tier championship DNS - Divizia Nationala de Seniori. The eventual champions of the SuperLiga which are CSM Știința Baia Mare have the right to participate in the European Rugby Continental Shield and no team will relegate to the Divizia Națională de Seniori, Romania's 2nd level rugby union competition as CS Năvodari didn't apply to play in the SuperLiga next season.

== Teams ==
Locations of teams in the 2019-2020 SuperLiga.

Club	City/County	Stadium	Capacity	Head Coach	Captain
Timișoara Saracens RCM UVT	Timișoara, Timiș	Stadionul Gheorghe Rășcanu; Dan Păltinișanu	1,000; 32,972	(New Zealand) Sosene Anesi	(Romania) Eugen Căpățână
CS Universitatea Cluj-Napoca	Cluj-Napoca, Cluj	Stadionul Iuliu Hațieganu; Cluj Arena	1,000; 31,479	(Romania) Horea Hîmpea	(Romania) Vlad Tomă
CSA Steaua București	București	Stadionul Ghencea II	2,000	(Romania) Dănuț Dumbravă	(Romania) Viorel Lucaci
CS Dinamo București	București	Florea Dumitrache	1,500	(Romania) Cristian Hîldan	(Romania) Cosmin Manole
CSM Știința Baia Mare	Baia Mare, Maramureș	Stadionul Lascăr Ghineț (Arena Zimbrilor)	1,000	(Argentina) Mario Alejandro Canale	(Romania) Marius Dănilă
CSM București	București	Stadionul Olimpia	1,000	(Georgia (country)) Lasha Tavartkiladze	(Romania) Adrian Ion
ACS Tomitanii Constanța	Constanța, Constanța	Stadionul Mihail Naca	1,000	(Romania) Cosmin Rațiu	(Romania) Johnny Sola
SCM Gloria Buzău	Buzău, Buzău	Stadionul Prinț Ghică	1,000	(Romania) Mugur Preda	(South Africa) Michael Scheepers

== Table ==
This is the regular season league table:

Key to colours in group tables
Advances to play-off semifinals.
Advances to play-out semifinals.

	Club	Played	Won	Drawn	Lost	Points for	Points against	Points difference	Bonus points	Points
1	CSM București	14	12	0	2	462	198	+264	10	58
2	Timișoara Saracens	14	11	0	3	418	240	+178	10	54
3	Știința Baia Mare	14	10	1	3	488	201	+284	11	53
4	Steaua București	14	10	1	3	444	223	+253	9	51
5	Tomitanii Constanța	14	4	0	10	179	440	-286	2	18
6	Gloria Buzău	14	3	0	11	197	387	-190	4	16
7	Dinamo București	14	2	1	11	239	441	-222	2	12
8	U Cluj-Napoca	14	2	1	11	229	477	-248	2	12

== Fixtures & Results ==
=== Round 1 ===
8 September 2018
11:00

Timișoara Saracens RCM UVT (1 BP)	51–6	SCM Buzău

Stadionul Gheorghe Rășcanu

8 September 2018
11:00

CSM Știința Baia Mare (1 BP)	52–11	ACS Tomitanii Constanța

Stadionul Lascăr Ghineţ

8 September 2018
11:00

CSA Steaua București (1 BP)	75–15	CS Universitatea Cluj-Napoca

Stadionul Ghencea II

8 September 2018
17:00

CSM București (1 BP)	38–9	CS Dinamo București

Stadionul Olimpia

=== Round 2 ===
15 September 2018
11:00

SCM Buzău (1 BP)	31–13	CS Dinamo București

Stadionul Prințul Șerban Ghica

15 September 2018
11:00

CS Universitatea Cluj-Napoca	13–49	CSM București (1 BP)

Stadionul Iuliu Hațieganu

15 September 2018
11:00

ACS Tomitanii Constanța	17–48	CSA Steaua București (1 BP)

Stadionul Mihai Naca

15 September 2018
11:00

Timișoara Saracens RCM UVT (1 BP)	32–26	CSM Știința Baia Mare (1 BP)

Stadionul Gheorghe Rășcanu

=== Round 3 ===
22 September 2018
11:00

CSM Știința Baia Mare (1 BP)	61–7	SCM Buzău

Stadionul Lascăr Ghineţ

22 September 2018
11:00

CSM București (1 BP)	50–5	ACS Tomitanii Constanța

Stadionul Olimpia

22 September 2018
11:00

CS Dinamo București	25–25	CS Universitatea Cluj-Napoca

Stadionul Florea Dumitrache

22 September 2018
14:30

CSA Steaua București	16–9	Timișoara Saracens (1 BP)

Stadionul Ghencea II

=== Round 4 ===
29 September 2018
11:00

SCM Buzău	12–7	CS Universitatea Cluj-Napoca (1 BP)

Stadionul Prințul Șerban Ghica

29 September 2018
11:00

Timișoara Saracens RCM UVT	19–16	CSM București (1 BP)

Stadionul Gheorghe Rășcanu

29 September 2018
11:00

CSM Știința Baia Mare (1 BP)	15–19	CSA Steaua București

Stadionul Lascăr Ghineţ

29 September 2018
14:30

ACS Tomitanii Constanța	17–13	CS Dinamo București (1 BP)

Stadionul Mihai Naca

=== Round 5 ===
6 October 2018
11:00

CSA Steaua București (1 BP)	31–10	SCM Buzău

Stadionul Gheorghe Rășcanu

6 October 2018
11:00

CS Dinamo București	16–33	Timișoara Saracens RCM UVT (1 BP)

Stadionul Florea Dumitrache

6 October 2018
11:00

CS Universitatea Cluj-Napoca	9–3	ACS Tomitanii Constanța (1 BP)

Stadionul Iuliu Hațieganu

6 October 2018
17:00

CSM București	26–14	CSM Știința Baia Mare

Stadionul Olimpia

=== Round 6 ===
13 October 2018
14:00

CS Dinamo București	15–27	CSA Steaua București (1 BP)

Stadionul Florea Dumitrache

13 October 2018
16:00

CS Universitatea Cluj-Napoca	7–42	CSM Știința Baia Mare (1 BP)

Stadionul Iuliu Hațieganu

27 October 2018
11:00

Timișoara Saracens RCM UVT	38–0	ACS Tomitanii Constanța

Stadionul Gheorghe Rășcanu

27 October 2018
13:00

CSM București (1 BP)	40–14	SCM Buzău

Stadionul Olimpia

=== Round 7 ===
20 October 2018
11:00

CS Dinamo București	17–53	CSM Știința Baia Mare (1 BP)

Stadionul Florea Dumitrache

20 October 2018
12:00

SCM Buzău	20–6	ACS Tomitanii Constanța

Stadionul Prințul Șerban Ghica

20 October 2018
14:30

CSA Steaua București (1 BP)	13–20	CSM București

Stadionul Ghencea II

9 March 2019
11:00

Timișoara Saracens RCM UVT (1 BP)	56–23	CS Universitatea Cluj-Napoca

Stadionul Dan Păltinișanu

=== Round 8 ===
16 March 2019
10:00

SCM Buzău (1 BP)	18–19	Timișoara Saracens RCM UVT

Stadionul Prințul Șerban Ghica

30 March 2019
09:00

ACS Tomitanii Constanța	5–49	CSM Știința Baia Mare (1 BP)

Stadionul Mihai Naca

30 March 2019
09:00

CS Universitatea Cluj-Napoca	18–36	CSA Steaua București (1 BP)

Stadionul Iuliu Hațieganu

30 March 2019
11:00

CS Dinamo București	22–50	CSM București (1 BP)

Stadionul Florea Dumitrache

=== Round 9 ===
6 April 2019
09:00

CSM București	33–8	CS Universitatea Cluj-Napoca

Stadionul Olimpia

6 April 2019
09:00

CSM Știința Baia Mare	20–16	Timișoara Saracens RCM UVT (1 BP)

Stadionul Lascăr Ghineţ

6 April 2019
11:00

CS Dinamo București	13–12	SCM Buzău (1 BP)

Stadionul Florea Dumitrache

6 April 2019
11:00

CSA Steaua București (1 BP)	52–0	ACS Tomitanii Constanța

Stadionul Ghencea II

=== Round 10 ===
13 April 2019
09:00

SCM Buzău	6–36	CSM Știința Baia Mare

Stadionul Prințul Șerban Ghica

13 April 2019
09:00

Timișoara Saracens RCM UVT (1 BP)	27–17	CSA Steaua București

Stadionul Dan Păltinișanu

13 April 2019
09:00

ACS Tomitanii Constanța	8–39	CSM București

Stadionul Mihail Naca

13 April 2019
09:00

CS Universitatea Cluj-Napoca	13–24	CS Dinamo București

Stadionul Iuliu Hațieganu

=== Round 11 ===
20 April 2019
09:00

CS Universitatea Cluj-Napoca	26–16	SCM Buzău

Stadionul Iuliu Hațieganu

20 April 2019
09:00

CS Dinamo București (1 BP)	25–27	ACS Tomitanii Constanța

Stadionul Florea Dumitrache

20 April 2019
09:00

CSA Steaua București	13–13	CSM Știința Baia Mare

Stadionul Ghencea II

1 May 2019
09:00

CSM București	21–16	Timișoara Saracens RCM UVT (1 BP)

Stadionul Olimpia

=== Round 12 ===
25 April 2019
09:00

ACS Tomitanii Constanța (1 BP)	35–30	CS Universitatea Cluj-Napoca (1 BP)

Stadionul Mihai Naca

26 April 2019
09:00

SCM Buzău	16–31	CSA Steaua București (1 BP)

Stadionul Prințul Șerban Ghica

26 April 2019
09:00

CSM Știința Baia Mare (1 BP)	31–19	CSM București

Stadionul Lascăr Ghineţ

26 April 2019
09:00

Timișoara Saracens RCM UVT (1 BP)	36–14	CS Dinamo București

Stadionul Dan Păltinișanu

=== Round 13 ===
4 May 2019
12:00

SCM Buzău	14–33	CSM București (1 BP)

Stadionul Prinț Ghică

4 May 2019
12:00

CSA Steaua București (1 BP)	54–19	CS Dinamo București

Stadionul Ghencea II

4 May 2019
12:00

CSM Știința Baia Mare (1 BP)	31–12	CS Universitatea Cluj-Napoca

Stadionul Lascăr Ghineţ

4 May 2019
12:00

ACS Tomitanii Constanța (1 BP)	25–26	Timișoara Saracens RCM UVT (1 BP)

Stadionul Gheorghe Rășcanu

=== Round 14 ===
11 May 2019
12:00

ACS Tomitanii Constanța (1 BP)	20–15	SCM Buzău (1 BP)

Stadionul Mihai Naca

11 May 2019
12:00

CS Universitatea Cluj-Napoca	22–40	Timișoara Saracens RCM UVT (1 BP)

Stadionul Iuliu Hațieganu

11 May 2019
12:00

CSM Știința Baia Mare (1 BP)	45–14	CS Dinamo București

Stadionul Lascăr Ghineţ

11 May 2019
12:00

CSM București (1 BP)	28–12	CSA Steaua București

Stadionul Olimpia

=== Play-off semifinals ===
The semi-finals were held on 18 May 2019 at Stadionul Olimpia and Stadionul Dan Păltinișanu respectively.

1	CSM București	17	22	CSA Steaua București
2	Timișoara Saracens RCM UVT	30	35	CSM Știința Baia Mare

Third place final Both finals were held on 25 May 2019, 1 week after the semi-finals at Stadionul Rulmental.

1	CSM București	20	19	Timișoara Saracens RCM UVT

First place final

1	CSA Steaua București	22	24	CSM Știința Baia Mare

=== Play-out semifinals ===
The semi-finals were held on 18 May 2019 at Stadionul Mihai Naca and Stadionul Prințul Șerban Ghica respectively.

1	ACS Tomitanii Constanța	22	40	CS Universitatea Cluj-Napoca
2	SCM Buzău	11	16	CS Dinamo București

Seventh place final Both finals were held on 26 May 2019, 1 week and 1 day after the semi-finals at Stadionul Olimpia.

1	ACS Tomitanii Constanța	12	14	SCM Buzău

Fifth place final

1	CS Universitatea Cluj-Napoca	22	17	CS Dinamo București
