= 2019–20 SuperLiga season =

2019–20 CEC Bank SuperLiga
- Countries: Romania
- Date: 31 August 2019 – 12 September 2020
- Champions: CSM Știința Baia Mare (7th title)
- Runners-up: Timișoara Saracens RCM UVT
- Top point scorer: (Romania) Dorin Manole (CSM Știința Baia Mare); 73 points
- Top try scorer: (Romania) Cristian-Marius Murgoci (CS Universitatea Cluj-Napoca); 11 tries

Official website
- www.super-liga.ro

The 2019–20 SuperLiga (also known as the CEC Bank SuperLiga for sponsorship reasons) is the 106th season of premier club rugby in Romania. Starting with this edition, the number of participating teams has decreased from eight teams to seven, due to CSM București dissolving before the start of the new season. At the end of April, Gloria Buzău announced that their senior team have dissolved due to financial issues concerning the COVID-19 pandemic leaving only 6 teams remaining in the SuperLiga for the remainder of the season. During August 2020, it was announced that Timișoara Saracens RCM UVT will restart in the SuperLiga under the new name of SCM Timișoara Rugby.

== Teams ==
Locations of teams in the 2019-2020 SuperLiga.

Club	City/County	Stadium	Capacity
Timișoara Saracens SCM UVT	Timișoara, Timiș	Stadionul Gheorghe Rășcanu; Stadionul Dan Păltinișanu	1,000; 32,972
CS Universitatea Cluj-Napoca	Cluj-Napoca, Cluj	Stadionul Iuliu Hațieganu; Cluj Arena	1,000; 31,479
CSA Steaua București	București	Stadionul Ghencea II	2,000
CS Dinamo București	București	Stadionul Florea Dumitrache	1,500
CSM Știința Baia Mare	Baia Mare, Maramureș	Stadionul Lascăr Ghineț (Arena Zimbrilor)	1,000
ACS Tomitanii Constanța	Constanța, Constanța	Stadionul Mihai Naca	1,000
SCM Gloria Buzău	Buzău, Buzău	Stadionul Prințul Șerban Ghica	1,000

=== Personnel and kits ===
Note: Flags indicate national union as has been defined under WR eligibility rules. Players may hold more than one non-WR nationality

Team	Manager	Captain	Kit manufacturer	Shirt sponsor
Timișoara Saracens SCM UVT	(Romania) Valentin Calafeteanu	(Romania) Eugen Căpățână	(Italy) Macron	Primăria Timișoara
CS Universitatea Cluj-Napoca	(Romania) Horea Hîmpea	(Romania) Vlad Rotar	(Ireland) O'Neills	Prodvinalco
CSA Steaua București	(Romania) Dănuț Dumbravă	(Romania) Viorel Lucaci	(China) Peak	Carpatina
CS Dinamo București	(Romania) Cosmin Rațiu	(Romania) Tudorel Bratu	(Spain) Joma	Autoservice Iancului
CSM Știința Baia Mare	(Romania) Eugen Apjok	(Romania) Marius Dănilă	(Romania) Tall Ball	Consiliul Local Baia Mare
ACS Tomitanii Constanța	(Romania) George Sava	(Romania) Adrian Ion	(Italy) Macron	Primăria Constanța
SCM Gloria Buzău	(Romania) Mugur Preda	(Romania) Cristi Boboc	(Ireland) O'Neills	Primăria Buzău

== Table ==
This is the regular season league table:

Key to colours
Advances to semifinals.
Advances to semifinal play-offs.
Withdrawn from competition.

Regular Table
	Club	Played	Won	Drawn	Lost	Points for	Points against	Points difference	Bonus points	Points
1	Știința Baia Mare	8	8	0	0	306	128	+178	5	37
2	Steaua București	8	6	0	2	309	132	+177	7	31
3	Timișoara Saracens	8	5	0	3	301	153	+148	7	27
4	Universitatea Cluj	8	4	0	4	202	295	-93	2	18
5	Dinamo București	7	2	0	5	154	233	-79	2	10
6	Gloria Buzău*	7	2	0	5	140	238	-98	2	10
7	Tomitanii Constanța	8	0	0	8	167	400	-233	1	1

- Note – Due to financial complications caused by the ongoing COVID-19 pandemic, Gloria Buzău have dissolved halfway through the season therefore giving their final play-off spot to Tomitanii Constanța

== Fixtures & Results ==
=== Round 1 ===
31 August 2019
10:30 EET (UTC+2)

Știința Baia Mare (TBP)	42–17	Tomitanii Constanța

Stadionul Lascăr Ghineț

31 August 2019
10:30 EET (UTC+2)

Steaua București (TBP)	33–17	Gloria Buzău

Stadionul Ghencea II

31 August 2019
10:30 EET (UTC+2)

Timișoara Saracens (TBP)	54–18	Universitatea Cluj-Napoca

Stadionul Dan Păltinișanu

=== Round 2 ===
7 September 2019
10:30 EET (UTC+2)

Tomitanii Constanța	24–34	Universitatea Cluj-Napoca (TBP)

Stadionul Mihai Naca

7 September 2019
10:30 EET (UTC+2)

Știința Baia Mare	18–15	Steaua București (LBP)

Stadionul Lascăr Ghineț

7 September 2019
12:30 EET (UTC+2)

Dinamo București	14–52	Timișoara Saracens (TBP)

Stadionul Florea Dumitrache

=== Round 3 ===
14 September 2019
10:30 EET (UTC+2)

Steaua București (TBP)	80–19	Tomitanii Constanța

Stadionul Ghencea II

14 September 2019
10:30 EET (UTC+2)

Universitatea Cluj-Napoca	28–20	Dinamo București

Stadionul Iuliu Hațieganu

14 September 2019
12:30 EET (UTC+2)

Timișoara Saracens (TBP)	38–10	Gloria Buzău

Stadionul Dan Păltinișanu

=== Round 4 ===
21 September 2019
10:00 EET (UTC+2)

Tomitanii Constanța	26–36	Dinamo București (TBP)

Stadionul Mihai Naca

21 September 2019
10:30 EET (UTC+2)

Gloria Buzău (TBP)	31–21	Universitatea Cluj-Napoca

Stadionul Prințul Șerban Ghica

21 September 2019
17:00 EET (UTC+2)

Știința Baia Mare	28–24	Timișoara Saracens (LBP)

Stadionul Lascăr Ghineț

=== Round 5 ===
28 September 2019
11:00 EET (UTC+2)

Universitatea Cluj-Napoca	15–52	Știința Baia Mare (TBP)

Stadionul Iuliu Hațieganu

28 September 2019
11:00 EET (UTC+2)

Dinamo București	31–15	Gloria Buzău

Stadionul Florea Dumitrache

28 September 2019
17:00 EET (UTC+2)

Timișoara Saracens (LBP)	13–20	Steaua București

Stadionul Dan Păltinișanu

=== Round 6 ===
4 October 2019
10:00 EET (UTC+2)

Timișoara Saracens (TBP)	69–7	Tomitanii Constanța

Stadionul Dan Păltinișanu

5 October 2019
11:00 EET (UTC+2)

Gloria Buzău	3–48	Știința Baia Mare (TBP)

Stadionul Prințul Șerban Ghica

5 October 2019
15:30 EET (UTC+2)

Dinamo București	7–36	Steaua București (TBP)

Stadionul Florea Dumitrache

=== Round 7 ===
11 October 2019
15:00 EET (UTC+2)

Steaua București (TBP)	61–19	Universitatea Cluj-Napoca

Stadionul Ghencea II

12 October 2019
11:00 EET (UTC+2)

Tomitanii Constanța	22–45	Gloria Buzău (TBP)

Stadionul Mihai Naca

12 October 2019
11:00 EET (UTC+2)

Știința Baia Mare (TBP)	44–17	Dinamo București

Stadionul Lascăr Ghineț

=== Round 8 ===
16 October 2019
16:00 EET (UTC+2)

Universitatea Cluj-Napoca	27–19	Timișoara Saracens

Stadionul Iuliu Hațieganu

19 October 2019
11:00 EET (UTC+2)

Tomitanii Constanța	18–54	Știința Baia Mare (TBP)

Stadionul Mihai Naca

19 October 2019
11:00 EET (UTC+2)

Gloria Buzău	19–45	Steaua București (TBP)

Stadionul Prințul Șerban Ghica

=== Round 9 ===
24 October 2019
12:00 EET (UTC+2)

Timișoara Saracens (TBP)	32–29	Dinamo București (LBP)

Stadionul Dan Păltinișanu

26 October 2019
11:00 EET (UTC+2)

Universitatea Cluj-Napoca (TBP)	40–34	Tomitanii Constanța (LBP)

Stadionul Iuliu Hațieganu

26 October 2019
14:00 EET (UTC+2)

Steaua București (LBP)	19–20	Știința Baia Mare

Stadionul Ghencea II

=== Round 10 ===
4 April 2020
11:00 EET (UTC+2)

Tomitanii Constanța	Cancelled	Steaua București

Stadionul Mihai Naca

4 April 2020
11:00 EET (UTC+2)

Gloria Buzău	Cancelled	Timișoara Saracens

Stadionul Prințul Șerban Ghica

4 April 2020
11:00 EET (UTC+2)

Dinamo București	Cancelled	Universitatea Cluj-Napoca

Stadionul Florea Dumitrache

=== Round 11 ===
11 April 2020
11:00 EET (UTC+2)

Dinamo București	Cancelled	Tomitanii Constanța

Stadionul Florea Dumitrache

11 April 2020
11:00 EET (UTC+2)

Universitatea Cluj-Napoca	Cancelled	Gloria Buzău

Stadionul Iuliu Hațieganu

11 April 2020
11:00 EET (UTC+2)

Știința Baia Mare	Cancelled	Timișoara Saracens

Stadionul Lascăr Ghineț

=== Round 12 ===
25 April 2020
11:00 EET (UTC+2)

Steaua București	Cancelled	Timișoara Saracens

Stadionul Ghencea II

25 April 2020
11:00 EET (UTC+2)

Știința Baia Mare	Cancelled	Universitatea Cluj-Napoca

Stadionul Lascăr Ghineț

25 April 2020
11:00 EET (UTC+2)

Gloria Buzău	Cancelled	Dinamo București

Stadionul Prințul Șerban Ghica

=== Round 13 ===
2 May 2020
11:00 EET (UTC+2)

Tomitanii Constanța	Cancelled	Timișoara Saracens

Stadionul Mihai Naca

2 May 2020
11:00 EET (UTC+2)

Steaua București	Cancelled	Dinamo București

Stadionul Ghencea II

2 May 2020
11:00 EET (UTC+2)

Știința Baia Mare	Cancelled	Gloria Buzău

Stadionul Lascăr Ghineț

=== Round 14 ===
9 May 2020
11:00 EET (UTC+2)

Gloria Buzău	Cancelled	Tomitanii Constanța

Stadionul Prințul Șerban Ghica

9 May 2020
11:00 EET (UTC+2)

Dinamo București	Cancelled	Știința Baia Mare

Stadionul Florea Dumitrache

9 May 2020
11:00 EET (UTC+2)

Universitatea Cluj-Napoca	Cancelled	Steaua București

Stadionul Iuliu Hațieganu

=== Play-off Semifinals ===
The play-off semifinals were held on 29 August 2020 at 15:30 Eastern European Time and 30 August 2020 at 15:30 Eastern European Time respectively at Stadionul Noua din Brașov.

1	Timișoara Saracens	57	15	Tomitanii Constanța
2	Universitatea Cluj-Napoca	13	20	Dinamo București

=== Semifinals ===
The semi-finals were held on 5 September 2020 at 15:30 Eastern European Time and 6 September 2020 Eastern European Time at 15:30 at Stadionul Stadionul Lascăr Ghineț and Stadionul Ghencea II respectively.

1	Știința Baia Mare	76	19	Dinamo București
2	Steaua Bucuresti	20	21	Timișoara Saracens

=== Finals ===
Fifth/Sixth place final

The Fifth/Sixth place final was held on 5 September 2020 at 10:00 Eastern European Time at Stadionul Iuliu Hațieganu, 6 days after the semi-final play-offs were held

1	Universitatea Cluj-Napoca	23	29	Tomitanii Constanța

Third/Fourth place final

The Third/Fourth place final was held on 12 September 2020 at 10;00 Eastern European Time at Stadionul Noua din Brașov, 1 week and 6 days after the semi-finals were held.

1	Dinamo București	13	33	Steaua Bucuresti

First/Second place final

The First/Second place final was held on 12 September 2020 at 15:30 Eastern European Time at Stadionul Noua din Brașov, 1 week and 6 days after the semi-finals were held.

1	Știința Baia Mare	23	17	Timișoara Saracens
