= Jason Tomane =

Romania international rugby union player

- Full name: Jason Fareti Lemalie Tomane
- Born: 4 March 1995 (age 31) Brisbane, Queensland, Australia
- Height: 187 cm (6 ft 2 in)
- Weight: 107 kg (236 lb; 16 st 12 lb)
- School: Marsden High School
- Notable relative: Joe Tomane (brother)

Rugby union career
- Position: Centre
- Current team: CSM Știința Baia Mare
Youth career
- 20??-2011: Sunnybank Rugby
- 2013: ACT Brumbies
Senior career
Years	Team	Apps	(Points)
2011-2016	Sunnybank Rugby	??	(??)
2016-2017	Gai Wu RFC	14	(90)
2017-2019	CSM București	20	(35)
2019-	Baia Mare	31	(35)
2022-	Romanian Wolves	5	(5)
- Correct as of 15 January 2024
International career
Years	Team	Apps	(Points)
2011	Australia under-17	??	(??)
2013	National Gold Squad XV	1	(10)
2020-	Romania	17	(5)
- Correct as of 15 January 2024

Jason Fareti Lemalie Tomane (born 4 March 1995) is an Australian-born Romanian rugby union player who plays at CSM Știința Baia Mare in the Liga Națională de Rugby and for the Romanian Wolves in the Rugby Europe Super Cup.

== Club career ==
=== Sunnybank Rugby ===
Tomane began playing rugby at Sunnybank Rugby. While there he was selected for the National Gold Squad XV and the ACT Brumbies. After 5 years at Sunnybank Rugby he moved to Hong Kong to play for Gai Wu RFC.

==== Gai Wu RFC ====
He spent a year in Hong Kong playing for Gai Wu RFC.

==== CSM București ====
In 2017 he joined Romanian Liga Națională de Rugby side CSM București. Going on to win the Cupa României twice in 2017 and 2018 as well as the Cupa Regelui in 2017. He left the club in 2019 to join rival side CSM Știința Baia Mare.

==== CSM Știința Baia Mare ====
Tomane joined then Champions of the Liga Națională de Rugby CSM Știința Baia Mare. At Baia Mare he has won the national championship four times, as well as the Cupa României.

==== Romanian Wolves ====
In 2022 he was named in the Romanian Wolves squad for the 2022 Rugby Europe Super Cup.

== International career ==
Qualifying for Romania through residency he made his debut in the 2021 Rugby Europe Championship, in a 56–15 win over the Netherlands. He was named in the Romanian squad for the 2023 Rugby World Cup.

== Honors ==
=== CSM București ===
- Cupa României: 2017, 2018
- Cupa Regelui: 2017

=== CSM Știința Baia Mare ===
- Liga Națională de Rugby: 2018–19, 2019-20, 2021, 2022
- Cupa României: 2020

== Personal life ==
He was born in Australia however has heritage from New Zealand, Samoa and Cook Islands. His brother is Australian international Joe Tomane.
