= Andrei Bucurescu =

Romanian rugby union player

- Full name: Andrei Bucurescu
- Born: 7 December 1993 (age 32) Romania
- Height: 1.93 m (6 ft 4 in)
- Weight: 108 kg (17 st 0 lb; 238 lb)

Rugby union career
- Position: Flanker
- Current team: Steaua
Senior career
Years	Team	Apps	(Points)
2012–18	Dinamo București	40	(5)
2018	CSM București	2	(0)
2019–Present	Steaua București	8	(0)
- Correct as of 27 February 2020
Provincial / State sides
Years	Team	Apps	(Points)
2013–14	București Wolves	2	(0)
- Correct as of 23 September 2017
International career
Years	Team	Apps	(Points)
2013–Present	Romania 7s	16	(5)
- Correct as of 27 February 2020

Andrei Bucurescu (born 7 December 1993) is a Romanian rugby union football player. He plays as a flanker for professional SuperLiga club Steaua București. He also plays for Romania's Sevens national team, the Oaks.

== Club career ==
Asides playing for Steaua, Andrei Bucurescu played mostly for Dinamo București and for a short period for CSM București, all in Romanian SuperLiga.
