= Florin Vlaicu =

Romania international rugby union player

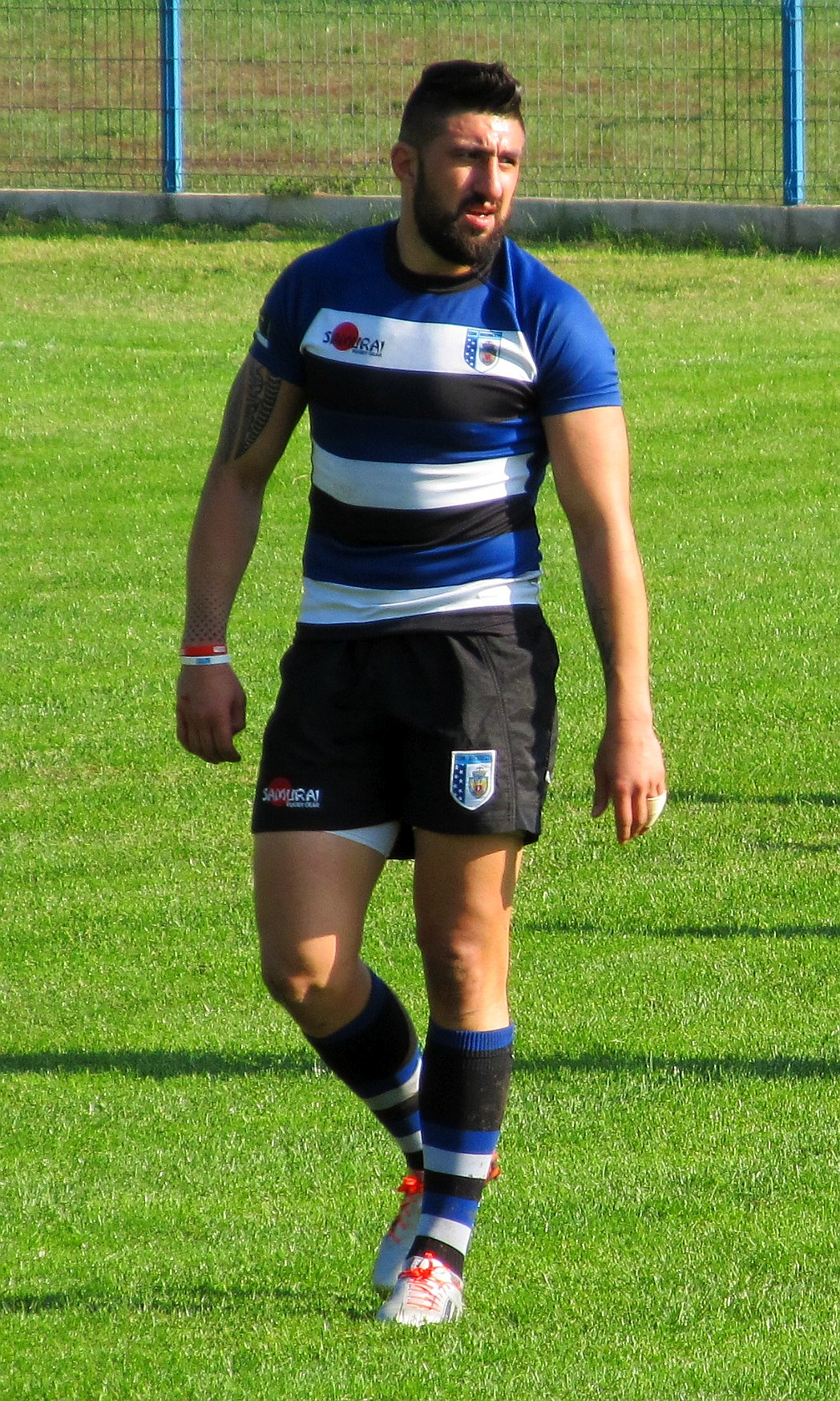
- Vlaicu featuring in a SuperLiga match in 2015
- Full name: Florian Adrian Vlaicu
- Born: 26 July 1986 (age 40) Bucharest, Romania
- Height: 1.86 m (6 ft 1 in)
- Weight: 103 kg (16 st 3 lb; 227 lb)

Rugby union career
- Position(s): Fly-half, centre, fullback
- Current team: SCM Timișoara
Youth career
- RC Flamingo București
- RC Grivița București
Senior career
Years	Team	Apps	(Points)
2005–2011	Steaua București	38	(189)
2011	RCM Timișoara	0	(0)
2012–2013	Steaua București	8	(59)
2014	Farul Constanța	18	(184)
2015	Olimpia București	10	(89)
2015–2016	Calvisano	14	(86)
2016–2018	Steaua București	21	(201)
2018–2019	CSM București	13	(128)
2019–2021	Steaua București	8	(42)
2021–2022	SCM Timișoara	10	(36)
- Correct as of 17 October 2021
Provincial / State sides
Years	Team	Apps	(Points)
2005–15	București Wolves	54	(306)
- Correct as of 12 April 2020
International career
Years	Team	Apps	(Points)
2006–2022	Romania	129	(1030)
- Correct as of 13 October 2021

Florin Vlaicu (born 26 July 1986) is a Romanian former rugby union player. He last played as a fly half or centre for Liga Națională de Rugby club SCM Timișoara. He could also play as a fullback, thus being considered a utility back due to his versatility. He is Romania's all time leading point scorer and the most capped player for his nation.

== Club career ==
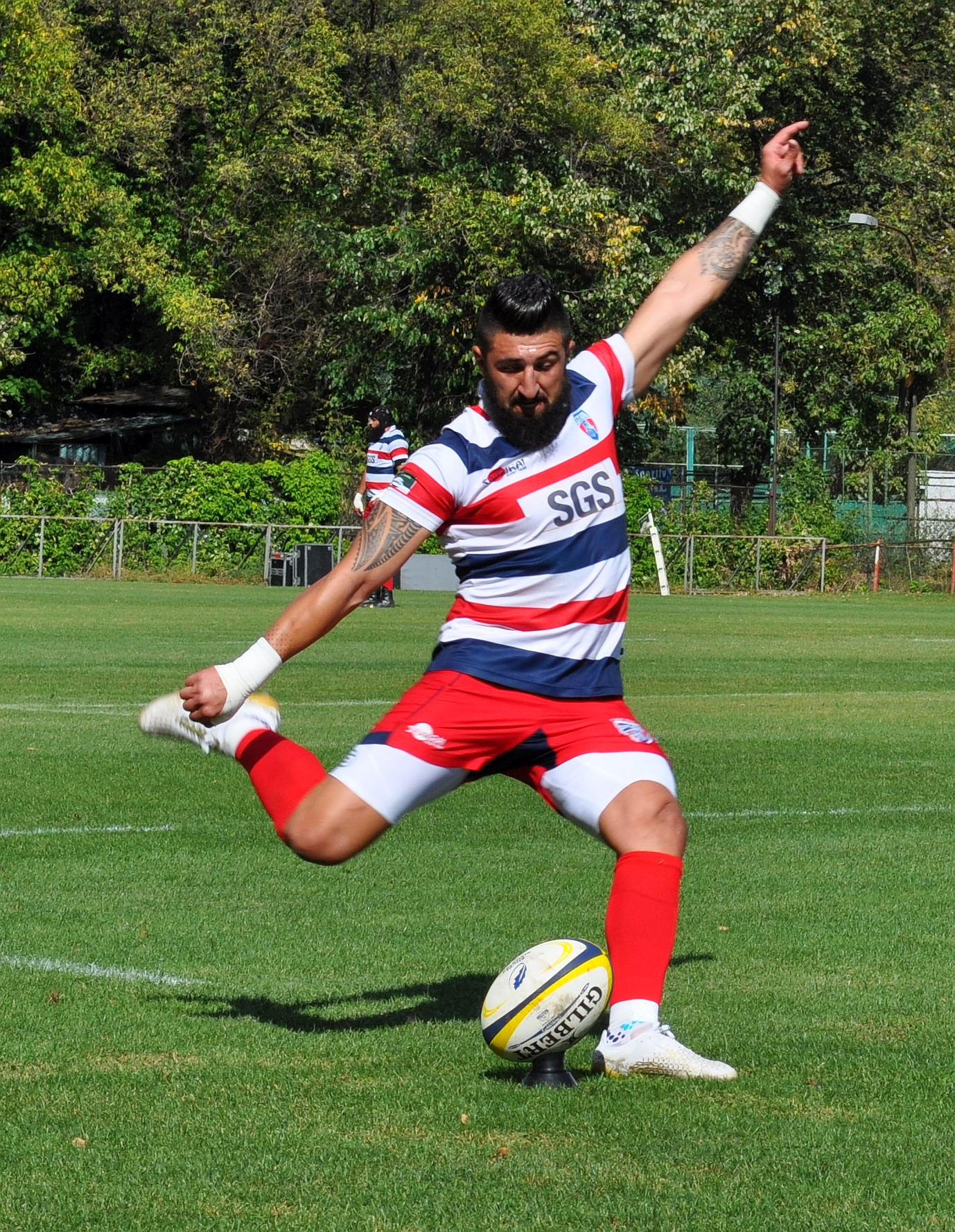
Vlaicu in 2017 playing for Steaua hitting the ball with his trademark shot

=== Junior years ===
Vlaicu started playing rugby at RC Flamingo București, an amateur rugby club that recruited schoolboys suited for the sport. He then moved to local club RC Grivița București, where he continued his junior years.

=== Senior years ===
After finishing his junior career he joined local giants Steaua. After 8 seasons with Steaua, with a brief stint with RCM Timișoara for whom he played one single match in 2011, he was signed in early 2014 by RCJ Farul Constanța, where he played for the whole season. Beginning with 2015 a move to local team CSM Olimpia București followed. After an impressive performance at the 2015 Rugby World Cup, Vlaicu was signed by Italian club Calvisano. After just one season with the Italians, Vlaicu returned to home soil, this time joining his former team Steaua. After 2 seasons we was once again signed by CSM București who had big ambitions at that moment in establishing a powerful side in order to capture both SuperLiga and Romanian Cup trophies. In 2019 his third spell with giants Steaua begun following the dissolution of his former club, CSM.

=== Provincial / State sides ===
Vlaicu was also selected between 2005 and 2015 for the State side assembled to play in the European Cups, namely București Wolves.

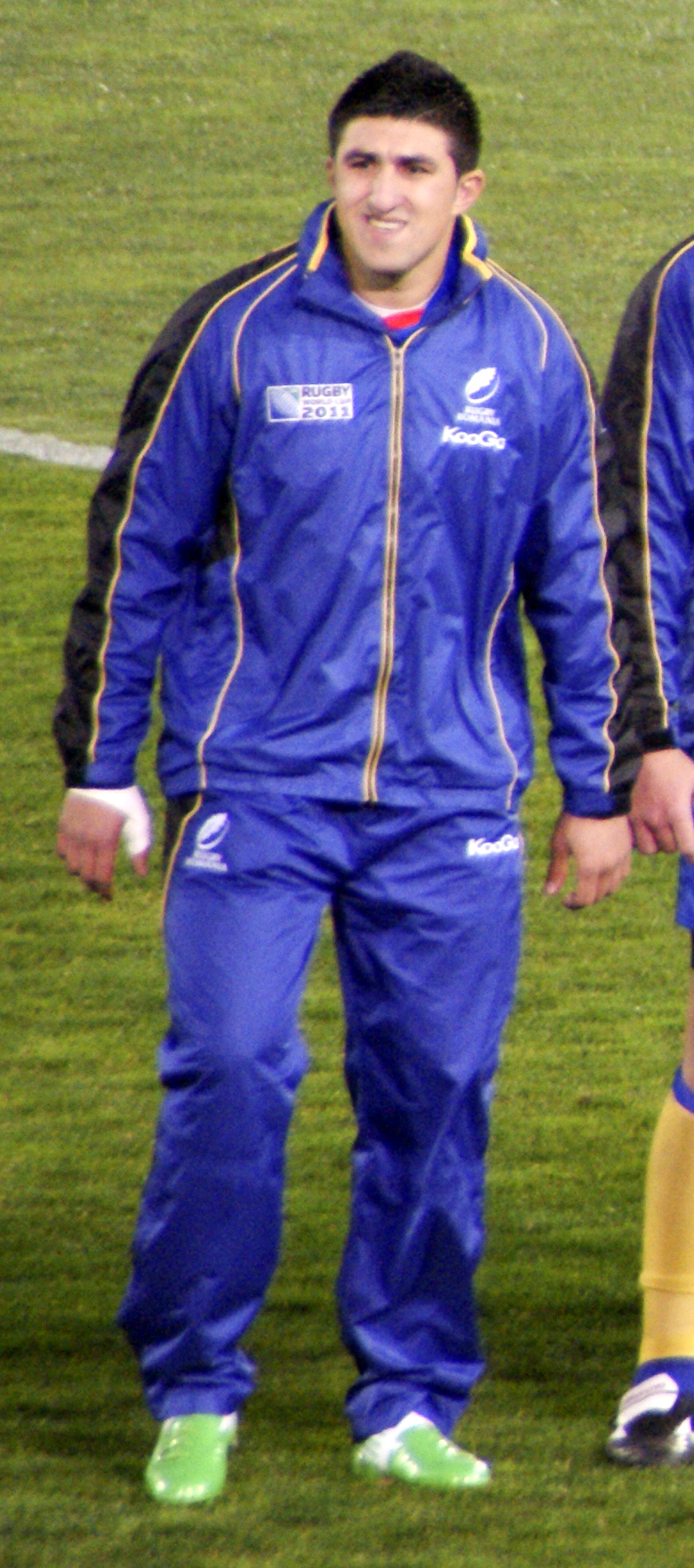
Vlaicu with Romania in September 2011.

== International career ==
Vlaicu made his international debut in 2006 as a substitute against Ukraine. He played for Romania in the IRB Nations Cup and in their 2007 Rugby World Cup qualifying before appearing for them in the 2007 Rugby World Cup. He played two Tests at the World Cup as a substitute against both Scotland and the All Blacks, scoring a penalty against the latter. He also played at the 2011 Rugby World Cup and the 2015 Rugby World Cup. He reached his 100th cap on 11 March 2017 when Romania played against Belgium in Brussels.

=== Records ===
Vlaicu set a series of records during his career. He is the most-capped Romanian player at international level with 129 caps, as well as the all-time caps leader from what World Rugby calls an "emerging nation"—defined in men's rugby as those outside of The Rugby Championship or Six Nations Championship. When he retired in 2022 he was the sixth leading top point scorer in international rugby, with 1030 points. Florin is also the most prolific point scorer for Romania at the Rugby World Cup with 28 points scored over three tournaments. On 13 March 2021 Vlaicu surpassed the 1000 point mark, kicking three penalties to help Romania overcome Portugal in the 2021 Rugby Europe Championship.

=== Retirement ===
Vlaicu announced his retirement from rugby at the end of 2022.

== Honours ==
=== Club ===
Steaua București

- Liga Națională
  - Champion: 2006
- Romanian Cup
  - Winner (3): 2006, 2007, 2019

RCM Timișoara

- Romanian Cup
  - Winner: 2011

CSM București

- Romanian Cup
  - Winner: 2018

=== International ===
Romania

- Rugby Europe Championships
  - Champion (3): 2004–06, 2008–10, 2016–17

== See also ==
- List of leading rugby union test point scorers
- List of rugby union test caps leaders
