= 2010 Divizia Națională season =

The 2010 Divizia Națională is the premier Romanian rugby union competition, reserved for club teams. It started in March 2010 and it will end on October 2, 2010. The current champions are CSM Știința Baia Mare. The champions managed to defend their title by defeating Steaua București.

== Teams ==
Location of clubs in Divizia Națională 2010

== Table ==
Key to colors
| Advances to play-off. |
| Goes to play-out. |

Group A
| | Club | Played | Won | Drawn | Lost | Points for | Points against | Bonus points | Points |
| 1 | CSM Știința Baia Mare | 10 | 10 | 0 | 0 | 547 | 76 | 9 | 49 |
| 2 | CS Dinamo București | 10 | 7 | 0 | 3 | 413 | 174 | 9 | 37 |
| 3 | CSU Aurel Vlaicu Arad | 10 | 6 | 0 | 4 | 218 | 245 | 3 | 27 |
| 4 | CSM București | 10 | 5 | 0 | 5 | 246 | 250 | 3 | 23 |
| 5 | CS U Cluj Napoca | 10 | 2 | 0 | 8 | 161 | 378 | 2 | 10 |
| 6 | CSM Bucovina Suceava | 10 | 0 | 0 | 10 | 108 | 568 | 1 | 1 |

Group B
| | Club | Played | Won | Drawn | Lost | Points for | Points against | Bonus points | Points |
| 1 | CSA Steaua București | 10 | 10 | 0 | 0 | 605 | 85 | 8 | 48 |
| 2 | RCJ Farul Constanța | 10 | 8 | 0 | 2 | 345 | 134 | 8 | 40 |
| 3 | RCM U de Vest Timișoara | 10 | 4 | 0 | 6 | 180 | 201 | 5 | 21 |
| 4 | CS Poli Agro Iași | 10 | 4 | 0 | 6 | 136 | 331 | 2 | 18 |
| 5 | CS Știința Petroșani | 10 | 3 | 0 | 7 | 116 | 351 | 0 | 12 |
| 6 | RC Bârlad | 10 | 1 | 0 | 9 | 142 | 422 | 1 | 5 |

== Play-out ==
Key to colors
| Promoted to 2011 SuperLeague. |
| Relegated to 2011 Divizia A. |

Play-out
| | Club | Played | Won | Drawn | Lost | Points for | Points against | Bonus points | Points |
| 1 | CSM București | 20 | 10 | 0 | 0 | 547 | 76 | 9 | 49 |
| 2 | CS U Cluj Napoca | 20 | 7 | 0 | 3 | 413 | 174 | 9 | 37 |
| 3 | Politehnica Iași | 20 | 6 | 0 | 4 | 218 | 245 | 3 | 27 |
| 4 | RC Bârlad | 20 | 5 | 0 | 5 | 0 | 0 | 3 | 23 |
| 5 | Petroșani | 20 | 2 | 0 | 8 | 0 | 0 | 2 | 10 |
| 6 | CSM Bucovina Suceava | 20 | 0 | 0 | 10 | 0 | 0 | 1 | 1 |

== Play-off ==
Key to colors
| Advances to semifinals. |

Play-off
| | Club | Played | Won | Drawn | Lost | Points for | Points against | Bonus points | Points |
| 1 | CSM Știința Baia Mare | 20 | 19 | 0 | 1 | 888 | 202 | 15 | 91 |
| 2 | CSA Steaua București | 20 | 16 | 0 | 4 | 868 | 271 | 13 | 77 |
| 3 | Farul Constanța | 20 | 14 | 0 | 6 | 642 | 340 | 12 | 68 |
| 4 | CS Dinamo București | 20 | 10 | 0 | 10 | 576 | 427 | 14 | 54 |
| 5 | Arad | 20 | 10 | 0 | 10 | 400 | 497 | 6 | 46 |
| 6 | RCM Timișoara | 20 | 6 | 0 | 14 | 316 | 550 | 7 | 31 |

Semifinals

| 1 | CSM Știința Baia Mare | 44 | 0 | CS Dinamo București |
| 2 | CSA Steaua București | 21 | 15 | Farul Constanța |

Third place

| 1 | CS Dinamo București | 19 | 28 | Farul Constanța |

Final

| 1 | CSA Steaua București | 21 | 28 | CSM Știința Baia Mare |
