= Alexandru Grigore =

Romanian rugby union player

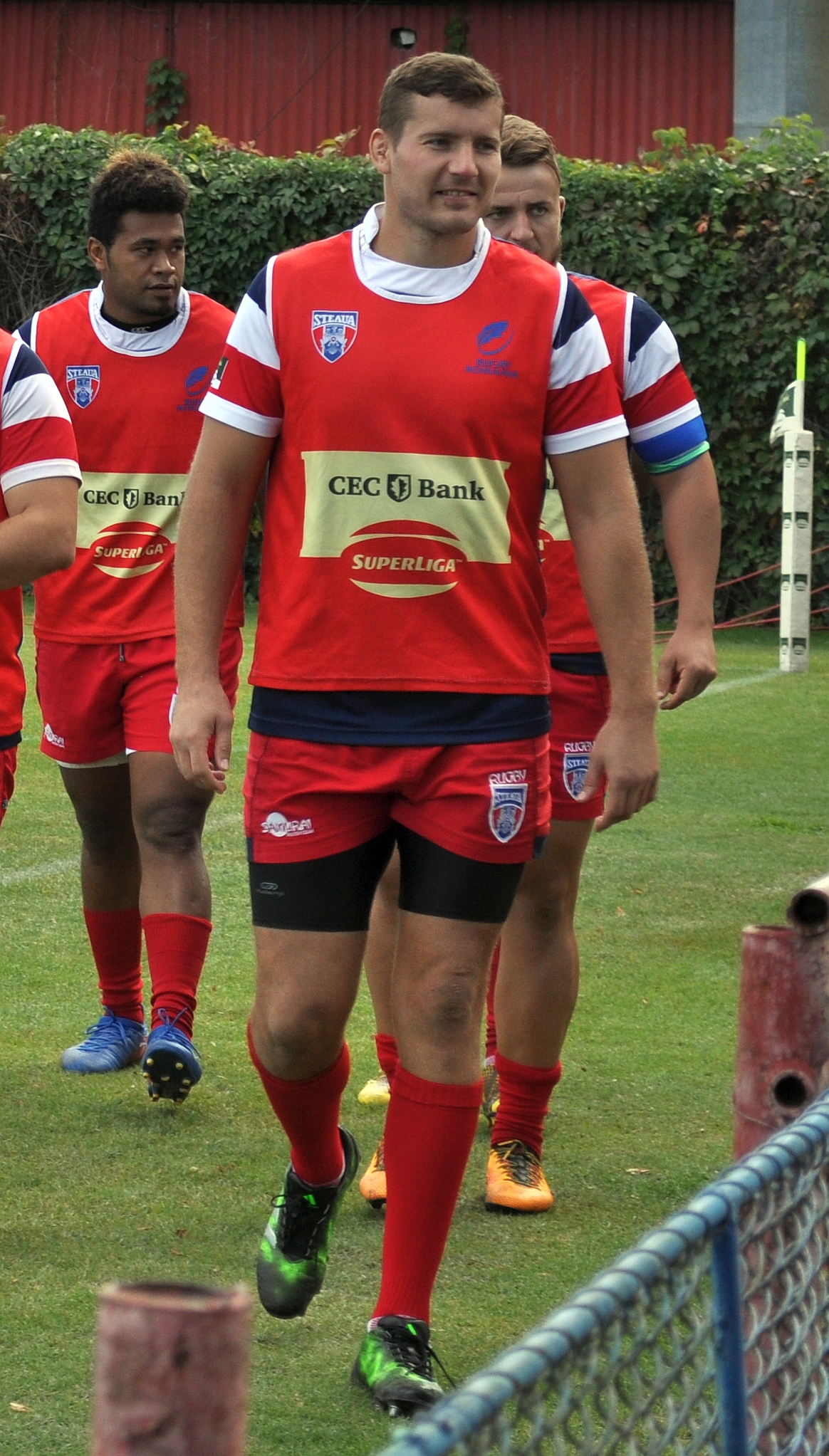
- Alexandru Grigore training with Steaua in 2017
- Full name: Alexandru-Florinel Grigore
- Born: 8 September 1986 (age 40) Pitești, Romania
- Height: 1.92 m (6 ft 3 1/2 in)
- Weight: 106 kg (16 st 10 lb; 234 lb)

Rugby union career
- Position: Lock
- Current team: Steaua
Senior career
Years	Team	Apps	(Points)
2005–	Steaua București	37	(20)
- Correct as of 23 September 2017
Provincial / State sides
Years	Team	Apps	(Points)
2008–14	București Wolves	4	(0)
- Correct as of 17 October 2017

Alexandru Grigore (born 8 September 1986) is a Romanian rugby union football player. He plays as a lock for professional SuperLiga club Steaua București.

== Career ==
Alexandru Grigore played most of his career for Steaua București and has been part of the team since 2005.

== Honours ==
Steaua București

- SuperLiga: 2005/06
- Romanian Cup: 2007, 2013
