= Marian Ispir =

Romanian rugby union player

- Born: 4 April 1992 (age 34) București, Romănia
- Height: 1.79 m (5 ft 10 1/2 in)
- Weight: 83 kg (13 st 1 lb; 183 lb)

Rugby union career
- Position: Wing
Senior career
Years	Team	Apps	(Points)
2011-13	CSA Steaua București		
2011-2014	București Wolves	18	(5)
2013-	CSM București	60	(45)
International career
Years	Team	Apps	(Points)
2016	Romania	1	(2)
National sevens team
Years	Team		Comps
2018-	Romania 7`s		3

Marian Ispir (born 4 April 1992), is a Romanian rugby union player who plays as a Winger for CEC Bank SuperLiga club CSM București and has previously played for his home country Romania and has also played for the Romanian national rugby 7's team.
