= Alexandru Mitu =

Romanian rugby union player

- Born: 9 March 1988 (age 38) București, Romănia
- Height: 1.93 m (6 ft 4 in)
- Weight: 105 kg (16 st 7 lb; 231 lb)

Rugby union career
- Position(s): Flanker; Lock
Senior career
Years	Team	Apps	(Points)
2011-13	CSA Steaua București		
2011-2014	București Wolves	18	(5)
2013-	CSM București	60	(45)
International career
Years	Team	Apps	(Points)
2013-14	Romania	8	(0)
National sevens team
Years	Team		Comps
2019-	Romania 7`s		

Alexandru Mitu (born 9 March 1988) is a Romanian rugby union player who plays as a Flanker and Lock for CEC Bank SuperLiga club CSM București and has previously played for his home country Romania and will now make his debut for the Romanian national rugby 7's team.
