= Randall Morrison =

Romania international rugby union player

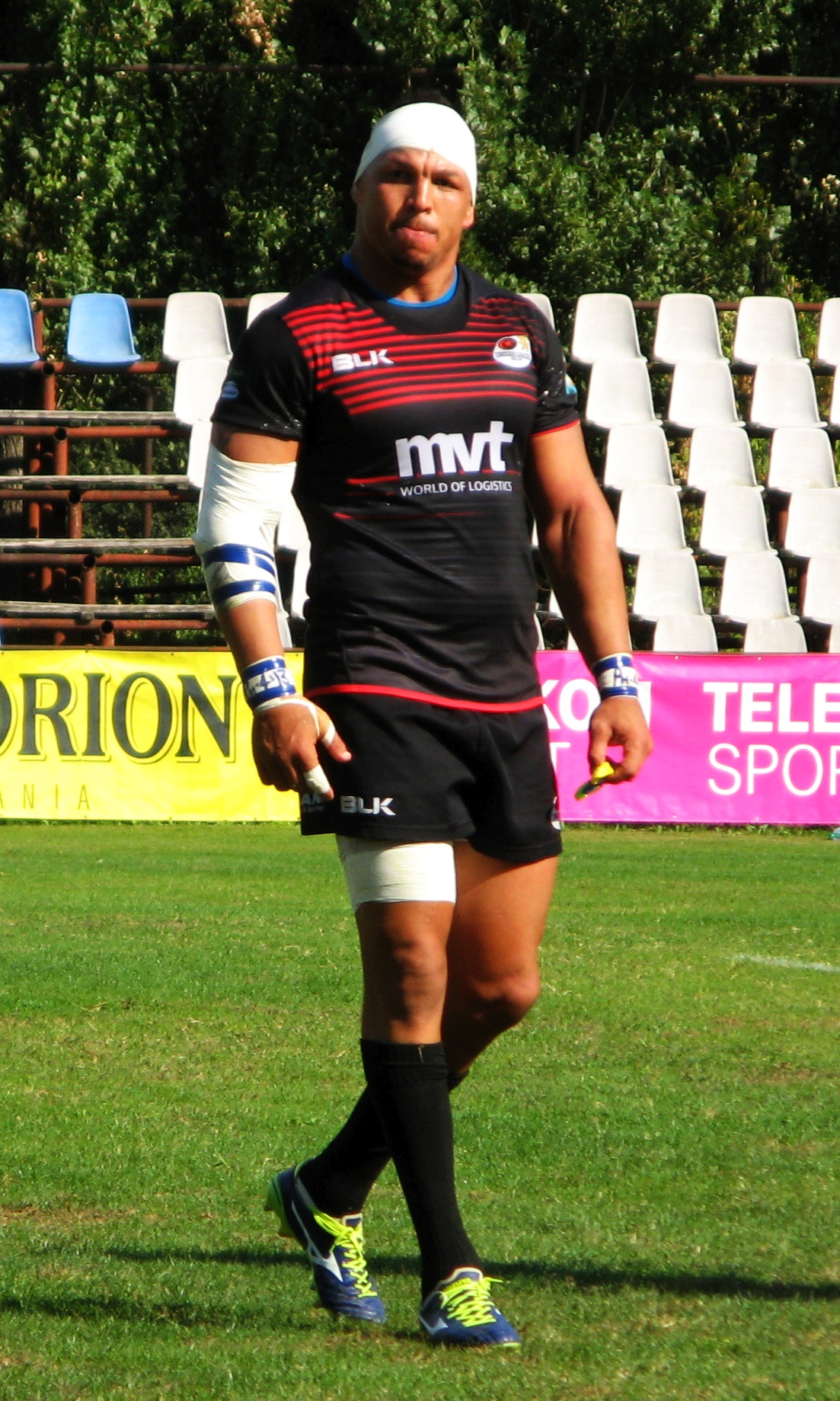
- Randall Morrison playing for Timișoara Saracens in 2018
- Full name: Randall Anthony Morrison
- Born: 12 February 1984 (age 42) East London, South Africa
- Height: 1.85 m (6 ft 1 in)
- Weight: 106.5 kg (16 st 11 lb; 235 lb)

Rugby union career
- Position: Flanker
- Current team: Timișoara
Senior career
Years	Team	Apps	(Points)
2004	Border Bulldogs		
2010	Golden Lions	1	
2013–21	Timișoara	30	(30)
2022–	Știința Petroșani	3	(0)
- Correct as of 15 April 2017
International career
Years	Team	Apps	(Points)
2015–	Romania	1	(5)
- Correct as of 15 April 2017

Randall Morrison (born 12 February 1984 in East London) is a South African-born Romanian rugby union football player. He plays as a flanker for professional Liga Națională de Rugby club Știința Petroșani.

== Career ==
Before joining Romanian Liga Nationala club in 2013, SCM Timisoara, Randall Morrison played for Border Bulldogs and Golden Lions. Randall played for Timisoara until 2021 and won an impressive 4 titles and 4 Romanian cups.

He also played for Romania's national team, the Oaks, making his international debut at the 2015 World Rugby Nations Cup in a match against the Welwitschias.

== Honours ==
- SCM Rugby Timișoara
  - Liga Națională de Rugby: 2013, 2015, 2017, 2018
  - Cupa României: 2014, 2015, 2016, 2021
