= Victor Dumitru =

Romanian rugby union footballer

Victor Alexandru Dumitru
- Born: Victor Alexandru Dumitru; 28 October 1991 (age 35) Buzau, Romania
- Height: 5 ft 8.9 in (1.75 m)
- Weight: 12 st 1.8 lb (77.0 kg)

Rugby union career
- Position: Scrum-half
Senior career
| Years | Team | Apps | (Points) |
- RC Timişoara

Victor Alexandru Dumitru (born 28 October 1991, Buzau, Romania) is a Romanian rugby union footballer. His position on the field is scrum-half and currently plays for RC Timişoara. He was formed as a player at the LPS Focsani rugby club and was runner-up in Romania in the Junior National Rugby Championship during his period there.
