= Cristi Boboc =

Romanian rugby union player

Cristian Boboc
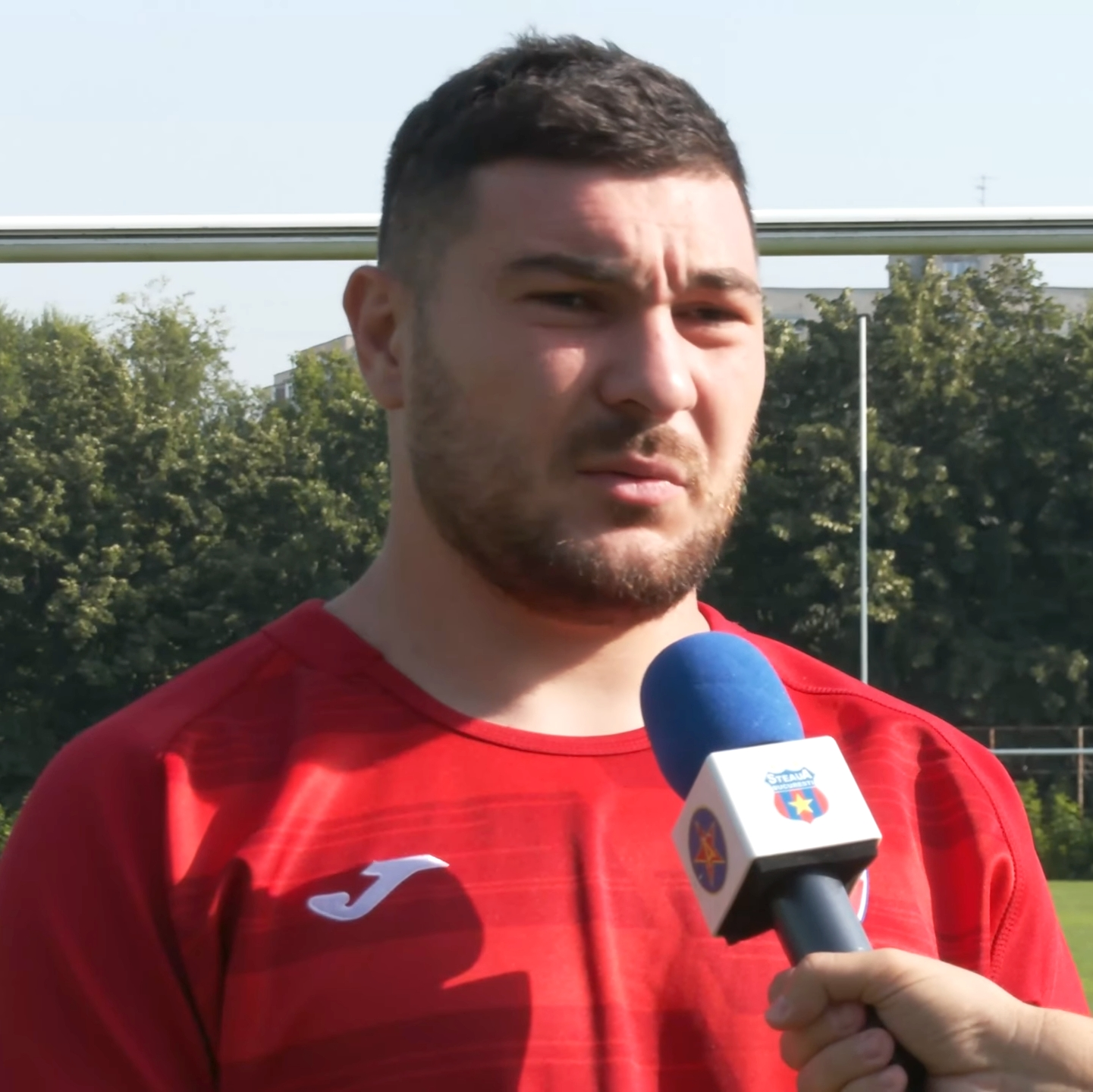
- Cristi Boboc in 2021
- Full name: Cristian Boboc
- Born: 9 October 1995 (age 31)
- Height: 1.88 m (6 ft 2 in)
- Weight: 108 kg (17 st 0 lb; 238 lb)

Rugby union career
- Position: Flanker
- Current team: Tomitanii Constanța
Senior career
Years	Team	Apps	(Points)
2018–20	Gloria Buzău	20	(15)
2020–Present	Tomitanii Constanța		
- Correct as of 19 January 2021
International career
Years	Team	Apps	(Points)
2021–Present	Romania	2	(0)
- Correct as of 27 March 2021

Cristian Boboc (born 9 October 1995) is a Romanian rugby union player. He plays as a flanker for Romanian SuperLiga club Tomitanii Constanța.

== Club career ==
Boboc started playing for SCM Gloria Buzău in 2018, at the age of 23 and shortly became the captain of team until 2020, the year where the team had dissolved due to financial reasons, and as a result, Boboc had transferred to Tomitanii Constanța

== International career ==
Boboc is also selected for Romania's national team, the Oaks, making his international debut during Round 3 of 2021 Rugby Europe Championship in a test match against Los Leones.
