= Cupa României (rugby union) =

Romanian rugby union cup competition

- Current season, competition or edition: 2025 Cupa României
- Sport: Rugby union
- Founded: 1914; 112 years ago
- First season: 1914
- Owner: Romanian Rugby Federation
- No. of teams: 6
- Country: Romania
- Most recent champion: SCM Timișoara (6th title)
- Most titles: CSA Steaua Bucuresti (16 titles)
- Broadcasters: TVR Sport (Some matches); RugbyTV.ro (Live Streams)
- Related competitions: Liga de Rugby Kaufland
- Website: rugbyromania.ro

The Cupa României is a rugby union cup competition for Romanian teams which has been held annually since 1914 except for a couple of years where the cup was not held either because of World War II or other unknown reasons. It is the country's main cup competition, although not being open to all clubs affiliated with the Federaţia Română de Rugby (FRR) like in previous editions and only being open to the six teams competing in the Liga de Rugby Kaufland.

== History ==
The Cupa României, like the SuperLiga was set up in 1914 as the main cup competition in Romania and was only competed by two teams which were Tennis Club Român and Sporting Club, both from București. This two team competition continued until the 1920s and 1930s where the number of clubs in the capital had increased due to the popularity of the tournament in the capital especially. But the Cupa României was cancelled again (after the first two time in 1917 and 1918 which was due to World War One), in 1940 and 1942 because of the second World War caused by Nazi Germany at the time. After the war had ended, the birth of eternal rivals CSA Steaua Bucuresti and CS Dinamo București had arrived, consequently meaning the Cupa României was being dominated by the militarii (military) and poliţişti (police) respectively during the 1950s era with only one side standing in both of their ways, which was Energia ISP București.

However, despite the growth of interest from Romanian fans in the Cupa României, it was not held between 1960 and 1972 for unknown reasons yet during this time, Stadiul Român along with seventeen more teams were founded in București-only while outside of the capital, teams were being founded finally after years of rugby being dominant in București. In the 1980s and 1990s, the Cupa României started to become more national in terms of the fact that teams like Știința Petroșani, Rulmentul Bârlad, Farul Constanța and Sibiu were winning the cup and beating most of the teams in București with style and grace.

In recent years although, the Cupa României has been restricted to teams in the SuperLiga only instead of being open to all teams in Romania possibly in an attempt to improve the standard of the game in the whole country after the collapse of communism in Romania back in 1989 where the number of clubs and players had decreased significantly in the aftermath.

The current champions of the Cupa României are SCM Timișoara after defeating 18-11 arch-rivals Știința Baia Mare, in the final played 20 December 2025.

== Teams ==
Location of clubs in the 2021 Cupa României.

Note: Flags indicate national union as has been defined under WR eligibility rules. Players may hold more than one non-WR nationality

Team	Manager	Captain	Stadium	Capacity
Dinamo București	(Romania) Cosmin Rațiu	(Romania) Petru Tamba	Stadionul Florea Dumitrache	1,500
Steaua București	(Romania) Dănuț Dumbravă	(Romania) Viorel Lucaci	Stadionul Ghencea II	2,000
Știința Baia Mare	(Romania) Eugen Apjok	(Romania) Marius Dănilă	Stadionul Lascăr Ghineț (Arena Zimbrilor)	1,000
Timișoara Rugby	(Romania) Valentin Calafeteanu	(Romania) Eugen Căpățână	Stadionul Gheorghe Rășcanu	1,000
Universitatea Cluj-Napoca	(Romania) Horea Hîmpea	(Romania) Vlad-Bogdan Rotar	Stadionul Iuliu Hațieganu	1,000

=== Winners ===
Pos.	Club	Wins	Winning years
1	Steaua București	16	1950, 1952, 1953, 1955, 1956, 1958, 1974, 1977, 1978, 2005, 2006, 2007, 2009, 2013, 2019, 2022
2	Dinamo București	14	1954, 1959, 1980, 1989, 1996, 1997, 1998, 2000, 2001, 2002, 2004, 2008, 2023, 2024
3	Știința Baia Mare	6	1981, 1990, 1999, 2010, 2012, 2020
3	SCM Rugby Timișoara	6	2011, 2014, 2015, 2016, 2021, 2025
4	RC Grivița București	5	1947, 1948, 1982, 1984, 1985
4	Stadiul Român București	5	1919, 1921, 1923, 1936, 1941
4	Viforul Dacia București	5	1934, 1939, 1942, 1945, 1946
8	Sportul Studențesc București	4	1937, 1949, 1975, 1976
9	Știința Petroșani	3	1983, 1991, 1993
10	Tennis Club Român București	2	1915, 1916
10	Politehnica Iași	2	1979, 2003
10	Poșta Telegraf Telefon București	2	1935, 1944
10	Sibiu	2	1994, 1995
10	CSM București	2	2017, 2018
10	Rulmentul Bârlad	2	1986, 1987
16	Farul Constanța	1	1992
16	Gloria Buzău	1	1988
16	Energia ISP București	1	1957
16	ȘEFS București	1	1920
16	Sporting Club București	1	1914

=== Winners by year ===
- 1914 - Sporting Club București
- 1915 - Tennis Club Român București
- 1916 - Tennis Club Român București
- 1917 - (cancelled due to WWI)
- 1918 - (cancelled due to WWI)
- 1919 - Stadiul Român București
- 1920 - ȘEFS București
- 1921 - Stadiul Român București
- 1922 - (not held)
- 1923 - Stadiul Român București
- 1924 - (not held)
- 1925 - (not held)
- 1926 - (not held)
- 1927 - (not held)
- 1928 - (not held)
- 1929 - (not held)
- 1930 - (not held)
- 1931 - (not held)
- 1932 - (not held)
- 1933 - (not held)
- 1934 - Viforul Dacia București
- 1935 - Poșta Telegraf Telefon București
- 1936 - Stadiul Român București
- 1937 - Sportul Studențesc București
- 1938 - (not held)
- 1939 - Viforul Dacia București
- 1940 - (cancelled due to WWII)
- 1941 - Stadiul Român București
- 1942 - Viforul Dacia București
- 1943 - (cancelled due to WWII)
- 1944 - Poșta Telegraf Telefon București
- 1945 - Viforul Dacia București
- 1946 - Viforul Dacia București
- 1947 - CFR București
- 1948 - CFR București
- 1949 - Sportul Studențesc București
- 1950 - CCA București
- 1951 - (not held)
- 1952 - CCA București
- 1953 - CCA București
- 1954 - Dinamo București
- 1955 - CCA București
- 1956 - CCA București
- 1957 - Energia ISP București
- 1958 - CCA București
- 1959 - Dinamo București
- 1960 - (not held)
- 1961 - (not held)
- 1962 - (not held)
- 1963 - (not held)
- 1964 - (not held)
- 1965 - (not held)
- 1966 - (not held)
- 1967 - (not held)
- 1968 - (not held)
- 1969 - (not held)
- 1970 - (not held)
- 1971 - (not held)
- 1972 - (not held)
- 1973/1974 - Steaua București
- 1975 - Sportul Studențesc București
- 1976 - Sportul Studențesc București
- 1977 - Steaua București
- 1978 - Steaua București
- 1979 - Politehnica Iași
- 1980 - Dinamo București
- 1981 - Știința CEMIN Baia Mare
- 1982 - Grivița Roșie București
- 1983 - Știința Petroșani
- 1984 - Grivița Roșie București
- 1985 - Grivița Roșie București
- 1986 - Rulmentul Bârlad
- 1987 - Rulmentul Bârlad
- 1988 - Gloria Buzău
- 1989 - Dinamo București
- 1990 - Știința CEMIN Baia Mare
- 1991 - Știința Petroșani
- 1992 - Farul Constanța
- 1993 - Știința Petroșani
- 1994 - Sibiu
- 1995 - Sibiu
- 1996 - Dinamo București
- 1997 - Dinamo București
- 1998 - Dinamo București
- 1999 - Știința Baia Mare
- 2000 - Dinamo București
- 2001 - Dinamo București
- 2002 - Dinamo București
- 2003 - Politehnica Iași
- 2004 - Dinamo București
- 2005 - Steaua București
- 2006 - Steaua București
- 2007 - Steaua București
- 2008 - Dinamo București
- 2009 - Steaua București
- 2010 - Știința Baia Mare
- 2011 - Universitatea de Vest Timișoara
- 2012 - Știința Baia Mare
- 2013 - Steaua București
- 2014 - Universitatea de Vest Timișoara
- 2015 - Timișoara Saracens
- 2016 - Timișoara Saracens
- 2017 - CSM București
- 2018 - CSM București
- 2019 - Steaua București
- 2020 - Știința Baia Mare
- 2021 - SCM Timișoara
- 2022 - Steaua București
- 2023 - Dinamo București
- 2024 - Dinamo București
- 2025 - SCM Timișoara

== See also ==
- Rugby union in Romania
