= Cosmin Manole =

Romania international rugby union player

- Full name: Cosmin Gabriel Manole
- Born: 22 October 1995 (age 31) Romania
- Height: 1.80 m (5 ft 11 in)
- Weight: 105 kg (16 st 7 lb; 231 lb)

Rugby union career
- Position: Prop
- Current team: Dinamo București
Senior career
Years	Team	Apps	(Points)
2014–Present	Dinamo București	47	(55)
- Correct as of 13 January 2019
International career
Years	Team	Apps	(Points)
2016–Present	Romania	3	(0)
- Correct as of 13 January 2019

Cosmin Gabriel Manole (born 22 October 1995) is a Romanian rugby union player. He plays as a prop for professional SuperLiga club Dinamo București.

== Club career ==
In 2014 he started his professional journey joining SuperLiga side, Dinamo București.

== International career ==
Manole is also selected for Romania's national team, the Oaks, making his international debut during the 2016 season of 2014–16 European Nations Cup First Division in a match against the Lelos on 19 March 2016.
