= Stadionul Municipal (Bârlad) =

Multi-use stadium in Bârlad, Romania

Stadionul Fepa 74
- Interactive map of Stadionul Fepa 74
- Location: Bârlad, Romania
- Coordinates: 46°14′33.1″N 27°40′13.0″E
- Owner: Municipality of Bârlad
- Capacity: Over 2,000
- Surface: Grass

Tenants
- FC Bârlad (2005–2009); Sporting Bârlad (2015–present); Atletic Bârlad (2016–present)

Fepa 74 Stadium is a multi-use stadium in Bârlad. It is the home ground of Sporting Bârlad and Atletic Bârlad. It holds over 2,000 people.
