= Divizia Națională de Seniori =

- Current season, competition or edition: 2018-19 Divizia Națională de Seniori season
- Sport: Rugby union
- Owner: Romanian Rugby Union
- Divisions: 2
- No. of teams: 12
- Country: Romania
- Most recent champion: CS Năvodari
- Level on pyramid: 2
- Website: SuperLiga.ro

Divizia Națională de Seniori is the second level of Romanian league competition for rugby union clubs. Divizia Națională de Seniori is run by Federația Română de Rugby. The top three teams of each group will play promotion playoffs and the remaining three teams play relegation playoffs.

== Competition ==
=== Format ===
The format is similar to that of the 2018–19 SuperLiga season. The Divizia Națională de Seniori season takes place between September and May. There are two groups of 6 teams in each one, with every team in division 1 playing each other home and away for a total of 8 matches per team and every team in division 2 to play each other home and away for a total of 6 matches per team. Points are awarded according to the following:

- 4 points for a win
- 2 points for a draw
- 1 bonus point is awarded to a team scoring 4 tries or more in a match
- 1 bonus point is awarded to a team that loses a match by 7 points or fewer

=== Promotion and relegation ===
The regular season runs through 8 and 6 matchdays. Upon completion of the regular season, the top three teams of each division qualify for the promotion playoff and the rest of the teams go to the relegation play-offs.

=== Finals ===
After the promotion playoff, final stages are played to determine the winner of the Divizia Națională de Seniori. The pairing of the final stages are as follows:

Round	Pairing
Semifinals
Semifinals	A.) 1st place) vs. 4th place)
Semifinals	B.) 2nd place) vs. 3rd place)
3rd place Final
3rd place Final	C.) Loser of match A) vs. Loser of match B)
1st place Final
1st place Final	D.) Winner of match A) vs. Winner of match B)

== 2018-19 season teams ==
=== Group Centre-North ===
Location of clubs in the Divizia Națională de Seniori 2018-2019

=== Group Centre-South ===
Location of clubs in the Divizia Națională de Seniori 2018-2019

== See also ==
- Rugby union in Romania
