= Complexul Sportiv Steaua =

Sports complex in Bucharest, Romania

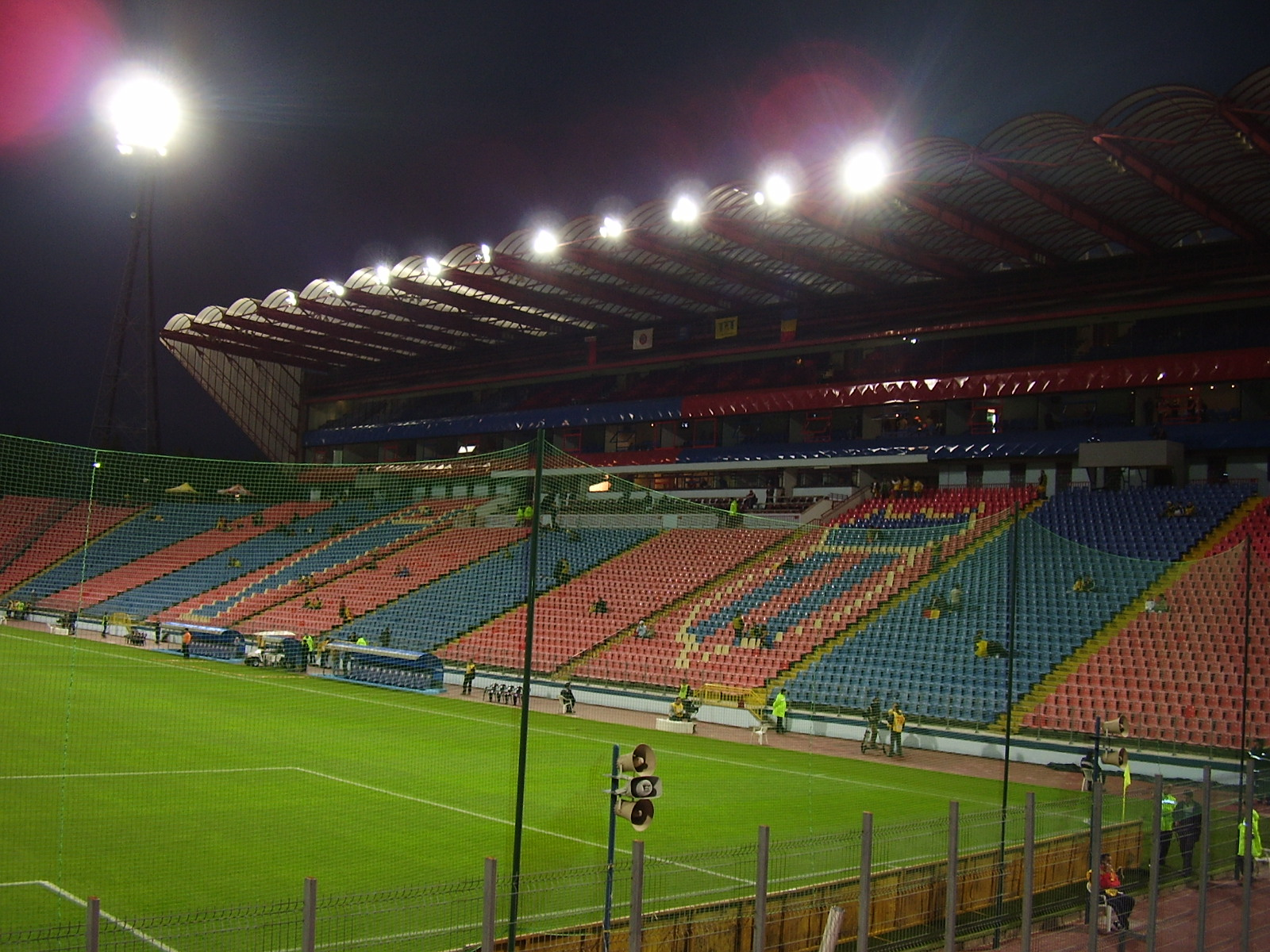
- Former Stadionul Steaua, demolished in 2018
- Interactive map of Complexul Sportiv Steaua
- Address: Blvd. Ghencea
- Location: Bucharest, Romania
- Coordinates: 44°24′46.9″N 26°02′34.9″E
- Owner: Ministry of National Defence
- Operator: CSA Steaua București

Complexul Sportiv Steaua, also known as Complexul Sportiv Ghencea, is a sports complex in Bucharest, Romania. It is currently used mostly for football, rugby, water polo and tennis matches, as well as for fencing, gymnastics and swimming competitions. The complex was built between 1948 and 1970s by the Ministry of National Defence, which is also the current owner of the complex. The main operator is CSA Steaua București, sports club managed by the same institution.

== Facilities ==
- Stadionul Steaua (2021)
  - capacity of 31,254 seats
  - used for football and some rugby matches
  - home ground of CSA Steaua București (football)
  - home ground of the Romania national football team for various matches
- Stadionul Steaua (1974)
  - opened on 9 April 1974
  - capacity of 28,365 seats
  - used for football and some rugby matches
  - home ground of CSA Steaua București (football) between 1974 and 2003
  - home ground of FCSB between 2003 and 2015
  - home ground of the Romania national team for various matches
  - demolished in 2018
- Stadionul Steaua 5
  - capacity of 1,528 seats
  - used for football
  - home ground of CSA Steaua București (football)
  - surrounded by other 2 grass pitches and 1 with an artificial turf

Rugby Stadium in 2017

- Stadionul Steaua (rugby)
  - opened in 1948
  - capacity of 2,000 people (1,200 seated)
  - used for rugby matches
  - home ground of CSA Steaua București (rugby)
- Stadionul Steaua 2 (rugby)
  - opened in 1948
  - capacity of 200 seats
  - used for rugby matches and trainings
  - training ground of CSA Steaua București (rugby)
- Steaua Fencing Hall
- Steaua Gymnastics Hall
- Steaua Tennis Complex (14 outdoor and 1 indoor grounds)
- Steaua Semi-Olympic Pool
