= SCM Gloria Buzău (rugby union) =

(Romania) Gloria Buzău
- Full name: Sport Club Municipal Gloria Buzău
- Founded: 2005; 21 years ago
- Disbanded: 2020; 6 years ago
- Location: Buzău, Romania
- Ground: Stadionul Prințul Șerban Ghica (Capacity: 1,000)
- President: Ion Cazan
- Coach: Mugur Preda
- Captain: Marco Fuhri
- League: CEC Bank SuperLiga
- 2019–20: 6th (before dissolvement)

Official website
- scm-gloriabuzau.ro/rugby/

SCM Gloria Buzău is a professional Romanian rugby union club from Buzău, which plays, starting with 2018-2019 edition, in the CEC Bank SuperLiga, the first division of Romanian club rugby. At the end of April, Gloria Buzău announced that they will withdraw from the national competition due to financial issues caused by the Coronavirus pandemic leaving only 6 teams in the SuperLiga for the remainder of the season. But they will continue to support their U10`s and U12`s teams.

== History ==
The team was founded in 2005 and bore the name Stejarul Buzău for most of its history. It was financed by the local authorities on a per-project basis until 2017, when the municipality created a sports club called Sport Club Municipal Gloria and took over several other sports teams in the city, including Stejarul.

== Honours ==
- Divizia Națională de Seniori:
  - Runners-up (1) : 2018
  - Third place (1) : 2017
- Divizia A:
  - Third place (1) : 2014
- Cupa României
  - Winners (1): 1988
  - Runners-up (1): 1990

== See also ==
- Rugby union in Romania
