= ACS Tomitanii Constanța =

Romanian rugby union club, based in Constanța

(Romania) ACS Tomitanii Constanța
- Full name: Asociația Clubul Sportiv Tomitanii Constanța
- Founded: 20 December 2009; 16 years ago
- Location: Constanța, Romania
- Ground: Stadionul Mihai Naca (Capacity: 1,000)
- President: Cristian Cojocaru
- Coach: Tuhakaraina Massey
- Captain: Adrian Ion
- League: CEC Bank SuperLiga
- 2019–20: 5th
1st kit	2nd kit

ACS Tomitanii Constanța is a professional Romanian rugby union club from Constanța, which plays in the CEC Bank SuperLiga, the first division of Romanian club rugby.

== Honours ==
- Divizia Națională de Seniori:
  - Winners (1) : 2017-18
- Divizia A:
  - Runners up (1) : 2016-17

== See also ==
- Rugby union in Romania
