= CS Universitatea Elbi Cluj =

Romanian rugby union club, based in Cluj-Napoca

(Romania) Universitatea Cluj
- Full name: Club Sportiv Universitatea Cluj-Napoca
- Founded: 1949; 77 years ago
- Location: Cluj-Napoca, Romania
- Ground(s): Stadionul Iuliu Hațieganu; Cluj Arena (Capacity: 1,000; 30,355)
- President: Csaba Gál
- Coach: Cristian Săuan
- Captain: Kuselo Moyake
- League: Liga Națională de Rugby
- 2026 Liga de Rugby season: 6th
1st kit	2nd kit

Official website
- u-cluj.ro/rugby-masculin/

Clubul Sportiv Universitatea Cluj-Napoca is a Romanian professional rugby union club from Cluj-Napoca, which currently plays in the Liga Națională de Rugby, the top tier in Romania operated by the Romanian Rugby Federation.

== Honours ==
- Liga Națională de Rugby:
  - Runners-up (1): 2001
  - Third place (4) : 1995, 1996, 1998, 2003
- Cupa României
  - Runners-up (3): 1998, 1999, 2002

== Notable former players ==
- (Romania) Csaba Gál
- (Romania) Cristian Săuan
- (Romania) Romeo Gontineac
- (Romania) Tiberiu Brînză
- (Romania) Nicolae Răcean
- (Romania) Paulică Ion
- (Romania) Cristian Petre
- (Romania) Alexandru Tudori
- (Romania) Valentin Maftei
- (Romania) Cristian Podea
- (Romania) Bogdan Voicu
- (Romania) Bogdan Bălan
- (Romania) Marius Tincu

== See also ==
- Rugby union in Romania
