= SCM USV Timișoara =

Romanian rugby union club, based in Timisoara

(Romania) SCM Rugby Timișoara
- Full name: Sport Club Municipal Rugby Timișoara
- Nickname(s): Bănățeni (People of Banat); Timișoreni (People of Timișoara); Leii (The Lions)
- Founded: 1949; 77 years ago
- Location: Timișoara, Romania
- Ground: Stadionul Gheorghe Rășcanu (Capacity: 1,000)
- President: Alexandru Ilie
- Coach: Mugur Preda
- Captain: Vlad Neculau
- League: Liga Națională de Rugby
- 2026: 1st
Team kit

Official website
- www.scmtimisoara.ro/echipa-rugby2020-2021/

SCM Rugby Timișoara is a professional Romanian rugby union club from Timișoara, which plays in the Liga Națională de Rugby, the first division of Romanian rugby. The team first won the championship in 1972, becoming the first club outside Bucharest to achieve this performance. In the modern format of the SuperLiga, SCM Rugby Timișoara won 4 titles in 6 seasons. The team is colloquially known as "Universitatea" Timișoara as it has historical ties with the University of Timișoara. In 2014 the club became a partner of London-based Saracens rugby club. In 2020, the club's partnership with London-based Saracens rugby club ended making them change their identity to SCM Rugby Timișoara. SCM Rugby Timisoara`s annual operating budget for the 2023-24 season is approximately 1,910,000 Euros.

== History ==
In 1949, CSUT (Club Sportiv Universitar Timișoara) played its first match in the city of Sighişoara against the local team, that match was won by CSUT with a score of 34–0, the team from Timișoara having the following line-up: Liteanu, Antonescu, Popa, Nistor, Haller, Onciul, Zomborian, Georgescu (player-coach), Dăncescu, Gurti, Kalincov, Barla, Baruch, Balios and Melinte.

=== Name change and first National title ===
Starting with the year 1966 the team changes its name from CSUT to Universitatea Timișoara; Mitică Antonescu was in charge of the team at that point. The year 1966 was the start of the ascension for the team from Timișoara. In the 1968–69 championship the team occupies 5th place, in the 1969–70 championship the team occupies 3rd place, in the 1970–71 championship the team occupies 5th place and in the 1971–72 championship, Universitatea Timișoara – after 58 years of supremacy from the teams from Bucharest – manages to bring the national title to Timișoara.

It is said that on 12 June 1972 (the day the team won the national title) the bells of the Metropolitan Cathedral in Timișoara rang one time more than usual, and on the second day at the gate of the boarding house where the majority of the rugby players of Universitatea Timișoara were living, on a board the following could be read: "Trecătorule, oprește-te un moment și înclină-te în fața ușii caminului unde trăiesc perlele rugby-ului românesc (translation: Passer-by, stop for a moment and take a bow in front of the door of the boarding house where the pearls of Romanian rugby are living)", the author of it being, at that time student, Nicolae Benga. Here are the artisans of this beautiful achievement: Duţă, Szasz, Cândrea, Peter, Suciu, Gheţu, Iacob, Ceauş, Tătucu, Nedelcu, Vollman, Rășcanu, Priess, Ionică, Ene, Malancu, Neiss, Popovici, Vlad, Ioniță, Arsene.

=== Previous club name ===
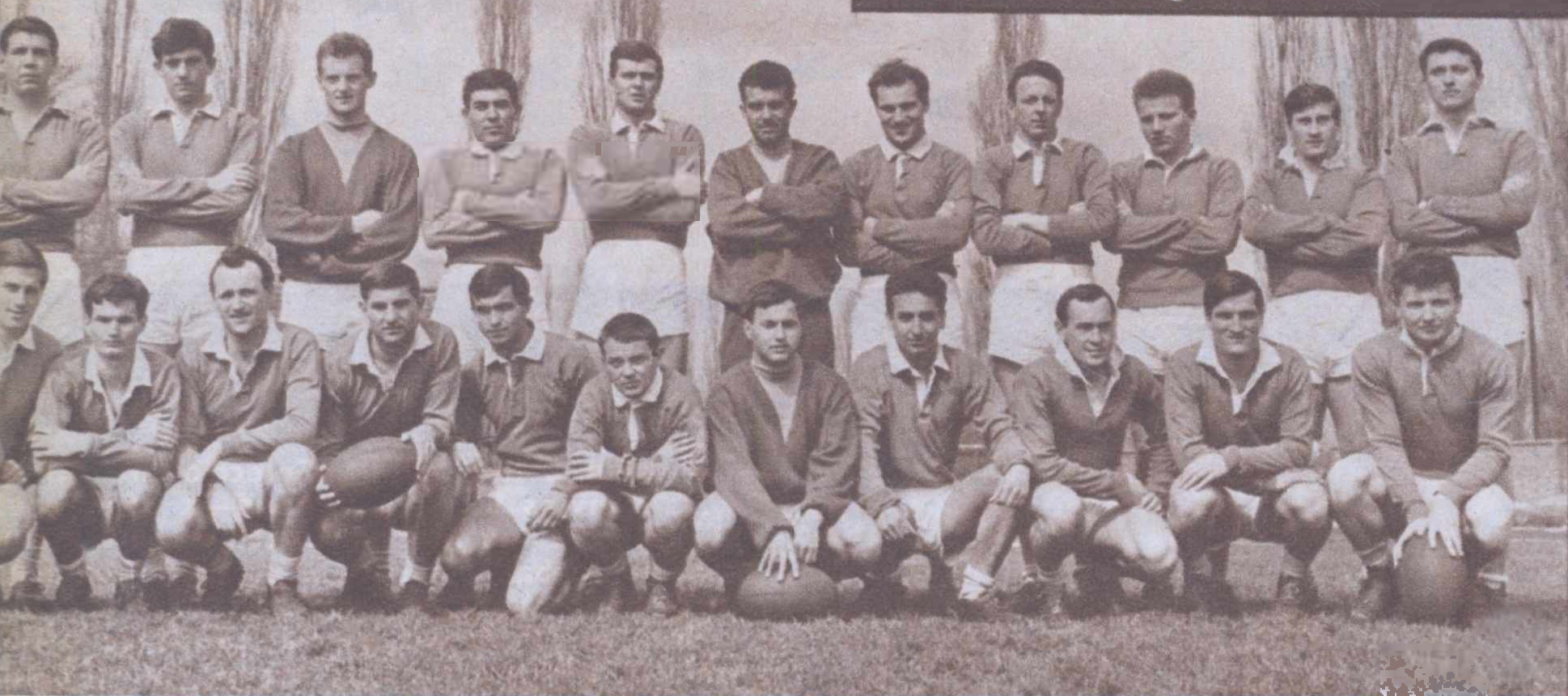
Știința Timișoara squad in 1965

- CSU Timișoara
- Știința Timișoara
- Universitatea Timișoara
- RCM Timișoara
- RCM UVT Timișoara

=== Chester Williams Era ===
In January 2012, former Springbok Chester Williams (the only non-white player in South Africa's winning 1995 Rugby World Cup team) joined Timișoara Saracens as head coach. His first attempt to get involved with Romanian rugby was being the technical director for CS Dinamo București. He was close to taking over the bench of Timișoara in the summer of 2011, but negotiations were put to a hold because of the World Cup that was taking place in New Zealand.

Williams brought Timișoara their first league title in 40 years in 2012. He was then replaced by fellow South African Danie de Villiers. In 2014, former New Zealand Heartland XV coach Grainger Heikell took over from De Villiers as head coach of Timișoara Saracens.

After two successful seasons for Timișoara, Chester Williams eventually returned to replace Danie de Villiers.

=== Romanian Cup ===
In 2011, Timișoara Saracens RCM UVT won the Romanian Cup for the first time, after a 32–10 victory against CSM Stiinţa Baia-Mare. The match took place in Alba Iulia, on the Cetate Stadium. Timișoara Saracens won the Romania Cup once again in 2014 with a victory over CSM Stiinţa Baia-Mare on Cluj Arena, and went on to repeat their cup success in 2015 and 2016.

=== Romanian Rugby Championship (pre-2012) and SuperLiga (2012-) ===
In 2011, Timișoara Saracens RCM UVT finished in 3rd place. After losing 22–24 to CSM Știința Baia Mare in the semifinals of the Romanian Rugby Championship, the team from Timișoara won the 3rd place final against Farul Constanţa (15–11). Under Chester Williams' management, they won the league in 2012 and 2013.

In 2014, Timișoara lost against Farul Constanța in the league semi-finals, after the medical visas were allegedly ripped out of the files of Timișoara Saracen's top six players. This is one of many corruption accusations made by the team.

Timișoara Saracens won the league again in 2015 and 2016–17. These two finals, as well as the finals in 2012 and 2013, were played against CSM Știința Baia Mare. Timișoara won 8 out of 8 finals (in the SuperLiga, Romanian Cup and King's Cup) they played against Baia Mare.

During August 2020, it was announced that Timișoara Saracens RCM UVT will restart in the SuperLiga under the new name of SCM Timișoara Rugby.

This was Timișoara Saracens` logo before they changed their name to SCM Rugby Timișoara as well as their badge.

== Honours ==
=== Domestic ===
- Liga Națională de Rugby:
  - Winners (7): 1972, 2012, 2013, 2015, 2016–17, 2017-2018, 2024
  - Runner-up (3): 1973, 2019-2020, 2025
  - Third Place (7): 1974, 1975, 1990, 1991, 1992, 2011, 2014
- Cupa României
  - Winners (5): 2011, 2014, 2015, 2016, 2021
  - Runner-up (4): 1978, 1980, 2018, 2019, 2022
- Cupa Regelui:
  - Winners (1): 2015
  - Runner-up (1): 2017

=== European ===
- Energy Cup (Central and Eastern European Rugby Cup):
  - Winners (1): 2009
  - Runner-up (2): 2010, 2011

== Current squad ==
Timișoara Liga Națională de Rugby squad
**Props**: (Romania) **Ciprian Chiriac**; (Fiji) **Mosese Ducivaki**; (Fiji) Joji Sikote; (Romania) **Alexandru Țăruș**; (Kenya) **Melvin Thairu**; **Hookers**: (Romania) **Eugen Căpățînă**; (Georgia (country)) **Giorgi Tedoradze**; (Romania) Sebastian Vasilovici; **Locks**: (Romania) **Lucian Mureșan**; (Kenya) **Malcolm Onsando**	**Back row**: (Romania) Kemal Altinok; (Tonga) Feʻofaʻaki Holoia*; (Georgia (country)) Aleksandre Kalmakhelidze; (Romania) Robert Murariu; (Romania) Andrei Mureșan; (Romania) **Vlad Neculau** (c); (Romania) **Dragoș Ser**; (Romania) Sebastian Sîrbu; **Scrum-halves**: (Romania) **Gabriel Rupanu**; (Georgia (country)) Luka Archvadze; **Fly-halves**: (Romania) Dănuț Jipa; (Romania) **Daniel Plai**	**Centres**: (Romania) **Alexandru Bucur**; (Georgia (country)) Khvicha Jgerenaia; (Romania) **Tevita Manumua**; **Wings**: (Romania) **Stephen Shennan**; (Romania) Romeo Corrado-Ștețco; (Fiji) Iliesa Tiqe; **Fullbacks**: (Romania) **Marius Simionescu**
(c) denotes the team captain, **Bold** denotes internationally capped players.^{*} denotes players qualified to play for Romania on residency or dual nationality.

== Notable former players ==
- (New Zealand) Sosene Anesi
- (New Zealand) Stefano Clement Hunt
- (New Zealand) Viliami Moala
- (New Zealand) Hayden O`Donnell
- (Australia) Tom Cox
- (Australia) Brian Sefanaia
- (South Africa) Kevin Luiters
- (South Africa) Marzuq Maarman
- (South Africa) Lötter Pretorius
- (South Africa) Pieter Stemmet
- (South Africa) Johan van Wyk
- (England) James Doyle
- (England) Thomas Whitehurst
- (Argentina) Roberto Edmundo Tejerizo
- (Fiji) Mesake Doge
- (Fiji) Lemeki Nabalei
- (Fiji) Henry Seniloli
- (Fiji) Manasa Saulo
- (Samoa) Michael Stewart
- (Tonga) Edmund Aholelei
- (Tonga) Paea Fonoifua
- (Tonga) Sione Halalilo
- (Tonga) Kefu Ikamanu
- (Tonga) Semisi Mahe
- (Tonga) Mateo Malupo
- (Tonga) Samiu Muna
- (Tonga) Sione Taupaki
- (Georgia (country)) Bidzina Shamkharadze
- (Romania) Petru Bălan
- (Romania) Ionel Badiu
- (Romania) Stelian Burcea
- (Romania) Valentin Calafeteanu
- (Romania) Daniel Carpo
- (Romania) Marian Drenceanu
- (Romania) Victor Dumitru
- (Romania) Daniel Ianuș
- (Romania) Marius Iftimiciuc
- (Romania) Paula Kinikinilau
- (Romania) Mădălin Lemnaru
- (Romania) Samuel Mariș
- (Romania) Ionel Melinte
- (Romania) Randall Morrison
- (Romania) Cristian Pană
- (Romania) Horațiu Pungea
- (Romania) Jody Rose
- (Romania) Vasile Rus
- (Romania) Luke Samoa
- (Romania) Laurențiu Tănase
- (Romania) Alexandru Țăruș
- (Romania) Jack Umaga
- (Spain) Emiliano Calle Rivas
- (Zimbabwe) Henri Boshoff
- (Moldova) Andrei Mahu
- (Paraguay) German Aranda

== Former coaches ==
- (New Zealand) Heikell Grainger
- (Australia) Matt Williams
- (South Africa) Chester Williams

== See also ==
- Rugby union in Romania
