= Stadionul Florea Dumitrache =

Sports venue in Bucharest, Romania

Coordinates: 44.4575°N 26.1025°E

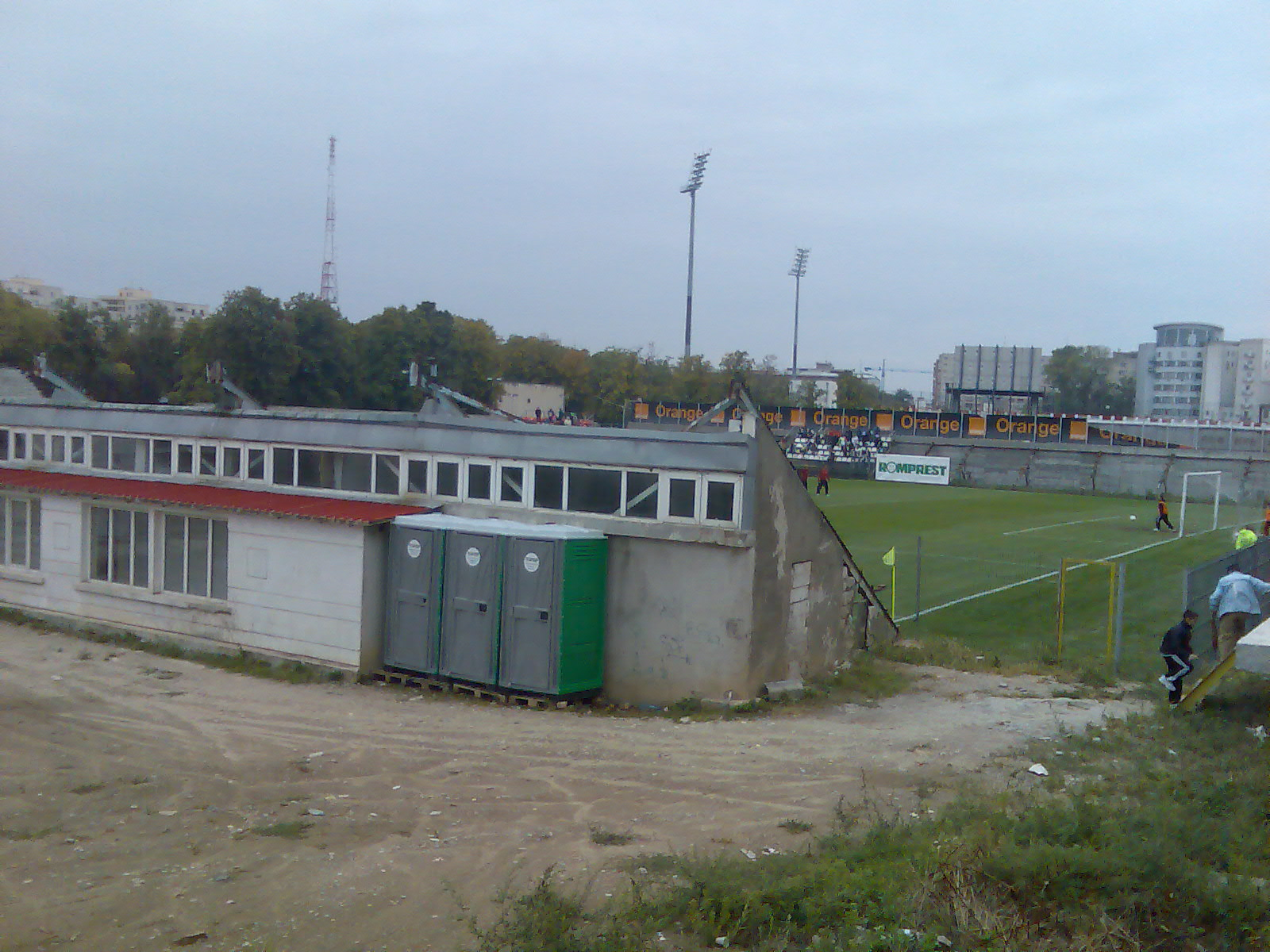
- Interactive map of Stadionul Florea Dumitrache
- Location: Bucharest, Romania
- Operator: Dinamo București (rugby)
- Capacity: 1,500
- Surface: Grass

Construction
- Opened: 1986

Tenants
- Victoria București; Dinamo II București; Dinamo București (rugby)

Florea Dumitrache Stadium is a multi-use stadium in Bucharest, Romania. It is the home ground of Dinamo București (rugby). It holds 1,500 people. It is named after Dinamo București and Romania legend, Florea Dumitrache (1948–2007).

The stadium was inaugurated in 1986, and until January 1990, it was home to Victoria București, the team that represented the communist Securitate, then being named Victoria Stadium.

When Dinamo II was established, in 2003, the team played its matches at this stadium.

In the early 2000s, Dinamo’s rugby team has also played its league matches at this stadium.

Dinamo’s management also wants to modernize the Florea Dumitrache Stadium.
