= CSA Steaua București (rugby union) =

Romanian rugby union club

Steaua București
- Full name: Clubul Sportiv al Armatei Steaua București
- Nickname(s): Steliștii; Roș-albaștrii (The Blue and Reds); Militarii (The Militaries)
- Founded: 1948; 78 years ago as CSCA București
- Location: Bucharest, Romania
- Ground: Stadionul Steaua (Capacity: 31,254)
- President: Ștefan Răzvan Bichir
- Coach: Viorel Lucaci
- Captain: Dragoș Ser
- League: Liga Națională de Rugby
- 2026: 3rd
1st kit	2nd kit

Official website
- www.csasteaua.ro/jocuri-sportive/rugby/

CSA Steaua București is a professional Romanian rugby union club from Ghencea, south-west Bucharest, which plays in the Liga Națională de Rugby, the first division of Romanian rugby. They are the most successful rugby union team in the Romania with 24 championship titles and 15 cup titles to their name. Steaua București`s annual operating budget is approximately 1,925,000 Euros.

== History ==
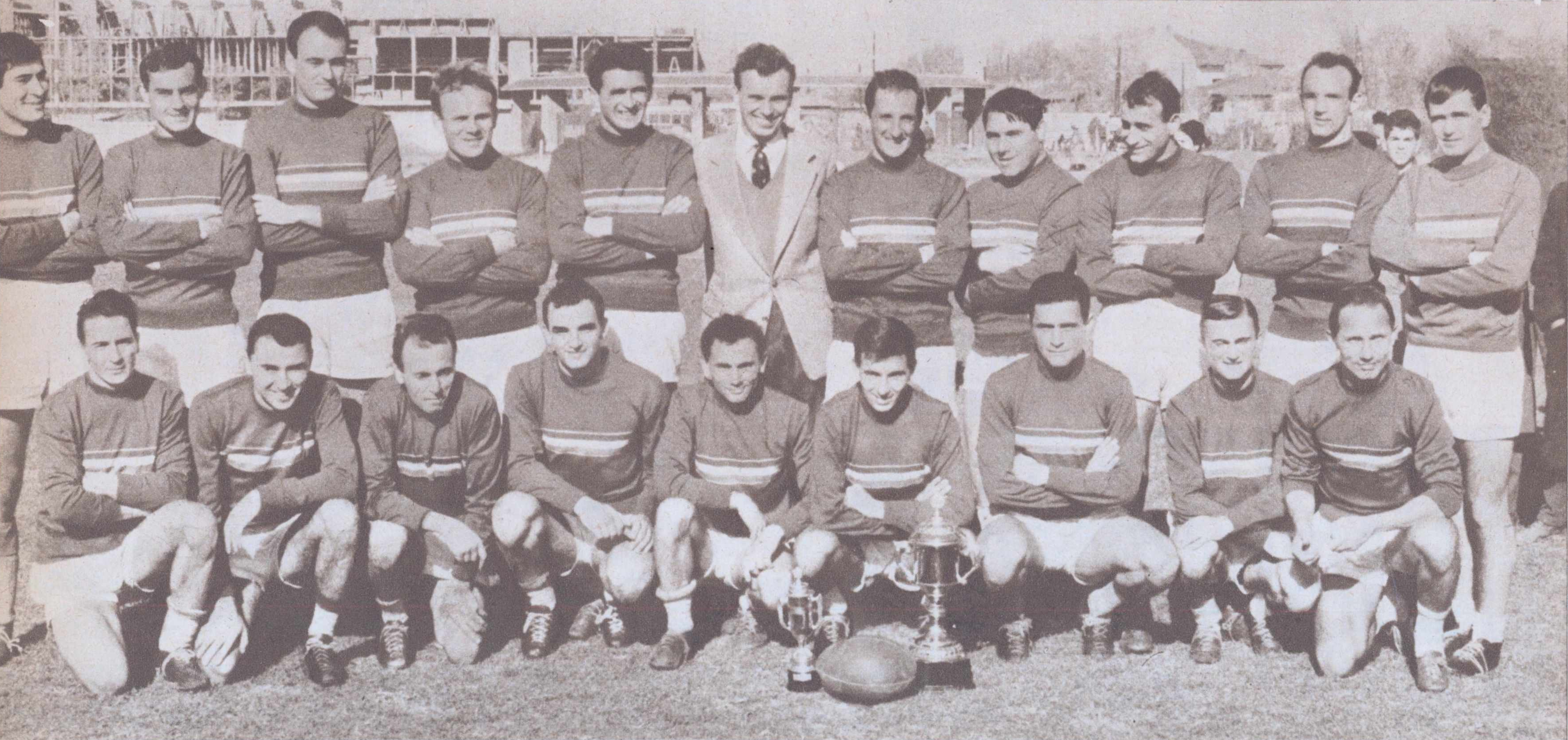
Steaua the champions of Romania in 1963

The Steaua București rugby club was founded in 1948, under the wing of the CSA Steaua București sports club that had been founded by the Romanian Army the previous year, and had traditionally consisted of members drawn from ranks of the army, hence their nickname, the military men.

Steaua established crosstown rivalries with Dinamo București and Grivița Roșie București before winning the team's first Romanian Cup in 1950. The team won the league and cup double in 1953, and by the late 1950s, Steaua was winning domestic titles with regularity. Over the years, the team has also claimed success at the European Championships, winning two European Cups.

Over the years, Steaua București has produced several players that have represented the Romanian national rugby team including Daniel Barbu, Marin Ionescu, Alexandru Penciu, Rene Chiriac, Paul Ciobănel, Adrian Mateescu, Florică Murariu, Mircea Braga, and Răducu Durbac.

== Honours ==
=== Domestic ===
- Liga Națională de Rugby:
  - Winners (24) (record): 1949, 1953, 1954, 1961, 1963, 1964, 1971, 1973, 1974, 1977, 1979, 1980, 1981, 1983, 1984, 1985, 1987, 1988, 1989, 1992, 1999, 2003, 2005, 2006
  - Runners-up (13): 1955, 1956, 1960, 2002, 2004, 2007, 2008, 2009, 2010, 2011, 2018–19, 2021, 2022
- Liga Națională de Rugby: (in 7 players)
  - Winners (13) (record)
- Cupa României
  - Winners (16) (record): 1950, 1952, 1953, 1955, 1956, 1958, 1974, 1977, 1978, 2005, 2006, 2007, 2009, 2013, 2019, 2022
  - Runners-up (5): 1954, 2008, 2010, 2012, 2015
- Cupa Regelui:
  - Runners-up (2): 2016, 2018

Players of CSA Steaua and Timișoara Saracens seen engaged within a scrum in a match during the 2016–17 SuperLiga in April 2017.

=== European ===
- FIRA European Cup
  - Winners (2): 1966, 1973

== Current squad ==
Steaua București Liga Națională de Rugby squad
**Props**: (Georgia (country)) Davit Abashidze; (Chile) **Ramón Ayarza**; (Romania) **Vasile Balan**; (Romania) Ionuț Pîrvu; (Argentina) Matías Vidal; **Hookers**: (Romania) **Tudor Butnariu** (c); (Romania) George Ilincuță; **Locks**: (Georgia (country)) Tornike Akubardia; (Romania) **Bogdan Doroftei**; (Romania) **Damian Strătilă**; (Ireland) Matthew Tweddle	**Back row**: (Romania) **Cristi Boboc**; (Romania) David Dinescu; (Romania) Ionuț Donici; (Romania) Andi Radu; (Romania) Ionuț Tudor; **Scrum-halves**: (Romania) **Alin Conache**; (Kenya) Amos Cornelius; (Romania) Cristian Nedelcu; **Fly-halves**: (Romania) Édouard Carp; (Argentina) Matías Frutos; (Romania) Ioan Nichitean; (Fiji) **Taniela Rawaqa***	**Centres**: (Chile) **Pablo Casas**; (Argentina) Tomás Ferreyra; (Netherlands) **Melle Haanstra**; (England) Isaak Welch; **Wings**: (Romania) **Ionuț Dumitru**; (Romania) Rafael Florea-Jilaveanu; (Romania) **Cosmin Iliuță**; **Fullbacks**: (Romania) **Robert Neagu**; (South Africa) **Siba Xamlashe**
(c) denotes the team captain, **Bold** denotes internationally capped players.^{*} denotes players qualified to play for Romania on residency or dual nationality.

== See also ==
- Rugby union in Romania
