= CSM București (rugby union) =

Romanian rugby union team

(Romania) CSM București
- Full name: Clubul Sportiv Municipal București
- Founded: 24 June 2007; 18 years ago
- Disbanded: 2019; 7 years ago
- Location: București, Romania
- Ground: Stadionul Olimpia (Capacity: 1,000)
- League: Liga Națională de Rugby
- 2018–19: 3rd

Official website
- www.csmbucuresti.ro

CSM Bucuresti was a Romanian rugby union team based in București, that played in the CEC Bank SuperLiga.

== Honours ==
- Cupa României:
  - Winners (2): 2017, 2018
- Cupa Regelui:
  - Winners (1): 2018

== See also ==
- Romania national rugby union team
