= CS Dinamo București (rugby union) =

Romanian rugby union club

(Romania) Dinamo București
- Full name: Clubul Sportiv Dinamo București
- Nickname(s): Bulldogii (The Bulldogs); Alb-roșii (The White and Reds)
- Founded: 1949; 77 years ago
- Location: Bucharest, Romania
- Ground: Stadionul Arcul de Triumf (Capacity: 8,207)
- President: Ionuț-Adrian Popa
- Coach: Carl Hogg
- Captain: Kamil Sobota
- League: Liga de Rugby Kaufland
- 2026 Liga Națională de Rugby season: 2nd
1st kit	2nd kit

CS Dinamo București is a professional Romanian rugby union club from Bucharest, which plays in the Liga Națională de Rugby, the first division of Romanian rugby. They are the second most successful rugby union team in Romania with 16 championship titles, 14 cup titles and even a Champions League title to their name. After a pause of 15 years, Dinamo won the 2023 Liga Națională de Rugby season, denying rival CSM Știința Baia Mare a 5th historic consecutive title.

== History ==
The Dinamo București rugby club was founded in 1949, under the wing of the CS Dinamo București sports club that had been founded by the Romanian Ministry of Internal Affairs the previous year.

Along with Steaua București and Grivița Roșie București (their two local-town rivals), they had dominated the 1950s scene in Romanian rugby as they won 3 Romanian Championships in 1951, 1952 and 1956, while also winning the Romanian cup twice in 1954 and in 1959.

Located in the nation’s capital, Bucharest, the Dinamo București side had traditionally consisted of members drawn from the ranks of the civil service and/or police. Along with the army side, Steaua, the Dinamo team is one of the nation’s top rugby union outfits.

Dinamo won their most recent title in the 2023 Liga Națională de Rugby season, defeating CSM Știința Baia Mare 17-13. Their only try was scored by the centre Mihai Graure, while four penalties were successfully executed by Jondre Williams.

In 2025 Dinamo appointed Carl Hogg as director of rugby, while Freddie Burns joined the team later in August in what was considered one of the most iconic transfers in the history of the Romanian Liga.

== Honours ==
=== Domestic ===
- Liga Națională de Rugby
  - Winners (17): 1951, 1952, 1956, 1965, 1969, 1982, 1991, 1994, 1996, 1998, 2000, 2001, 2002, 2004, 2007, 2008, 2023
  - Runners-up (2): 2003, 2005
- Cupa României
  - Winners (14): 1954, 1959, 1980, 1989, 1996, 1997, 1998, 2000, 2001, 2002, 2004, 2008, 2023, 2024
  - Runners-up (2): 1981, 2005

=== European ===
- Champions League (rugby)
  - Winners (1): 1967

== Current squad ==
Dinamo București Liga de Rugby Kaufland squad
**Props**: (Romania) Andrei Crețu; (Romania) **Alexandru Gordaș**; (Romania) **Cosmin Manole**; (Georgia (country)) Shota Nachkebia; (Romania) Bogdan Neacșu; (South Africa) JP Smith; (Romania) **Dorin Tică**; **Hookers**: (Romania) **Ovidiu Cojocaru** (c); (Ireland) Adam McBurney; (Romania) Sergiu Puescu; (South Africa) Rohan Schwartz; **Locks**: (South Africa) Lunga Ncube; (Romania) Marcel Rusu; (Fiji) Sailasa Turagaluvu; (Romania) **Johan van Heerden**	**Back row**: (Romania) Eduard Cioroabă; (South Africa) Keanan Murray; (Romania) **Kamil Sobota**; (South Africa) Etienne Terblanche; **Scrum-halves**: (Romania) Robert Ionașcu; (South Africa) Jondré Williams; **Fly-halves**: (England) **Freddie Burns**; (Romania) Ștefan Cojocariu	**Centres**: (Romania) **Mihai Graure**; (Samoa) **Joe Perez**; **Wings**: (South Africa) Dylan Schwartz; (Argentina) Santiago Werkalec; **Fullbacks**: (Romania) **Ovidiu Neagu**; (Namibia) Godwin Silvanus
(c) denotes the team captain, **Bold** denotes internationally capped players.^{*} denotes players qualified to play for Romania on residency or dual nationality.

== See also ==
- Rugby union in Romania
