= 2011 Rugby World Cup Pool B =

Pool B of the 2011 Rugby World Cup began on 10 September 2011 and was completed on 2 October. The pool was composed of the 2007 runners-up England, as well as the third-placed team from 2007, Argentina, and Georgia, Romania and Scotland.

== Standings ==
Pos	Team	Pld	W	D	L	PF	PA	PD	T	B	Pts	Qualification
1	England	4	4	0	0	137	34	+103	18	2	18	Advanced to the quarter-finals and qualified for the 2015 Rugby World Cup
2	Argentina	4	3	0	1	90	40	+50	10	2	14	Advanced to the quarter-finals and qualified for the 2015 Rugby World Cup
3	Scotland	4	2	0	2	73	59	+14	4	3	11	Eliminated but qualified for 2015 Rugby World Cup
4	Georgia	4	1	0	3	48	90	−42	3	0	4	
5	Romania	4	0	0	4	44	169	−125	3	0	0	

== Matches ==
All times are local New Zealand time (UTC+12 until 24 September, UTC+13 from 25 September)

=== Scotland vs Romania ===
10 September 2011
13:00

Scotland	34–24	Romania
Try: Blair 8' m Ansbro 21' c Danielli (2) 75' m, 78' m Con: Paterson (1/4); Pen: Paterson (4/5) 3', 38', 53', 71'	Report	Try: Lazăr 40+' m Carpo 67' c Con: Dimofte (1/2); Pen: Dumbravă (2/4) 12', 23'; Dimofte (2/2) 54', 62'

Rugby Park Stadium, Invercargill
Attendance: 12,592
Referee: Dave Pearson (England)

FB	15	Chris Paterson
RW	14	Max Evans
OC	13	Joe Ansbro
IC	12	Sean Lamont
LW	11	Simon Danielli
FH	10	Ruaridh Jackson	(substituted off) 53'
SH	9	Mike Blair	(substituted off) 62'
N8	8	Richie Vernon
OF	7	John Barclay	(substituted off) 62'
BF	6	Kelly Brown
RL	5	Alastair Kellock (c)
LL	4	Richie Gray	(substituted off) 53'
TP	3	Geoff Cross
HK	2	Ross Ford	(substituted off) 80+'
LP	1	Allan Jacobsen	(substituted off) 62'
Replacements:
HK	16	Scott Lawson	(substituted in) 80+'
PR	17	Alasdair Dickinson	(substituted in) 62'
LK	18	Nathan Hines	(substituted in) 53'
FL	19	Ross Rennie	(substituted in) 62'
SH	20	Chris Cusiter	(substituted in) 62'
FH	21	Dan Parks	(substituted in) 53'
FB	22	Rory Lamont
Coach:
(England) Andy Robinson

FB	15	Iulian Dumitraș	(substituted off) 59'
RW	14	Ștefan Ciuntu
OC	13	Csaba Gál
IC	12	Ionuț Dimofte
LW	11	Mădălin Lemnaru
FH	10	Dănuț Dumbravă	(substituted off) 52'
SH	9	Lucian Sîrbu	(substituted off) 52'
N8	8	Daniel Carpo
OF	7	Ovidiu Tonița
BF	6	Mihai Macovei	(substituted off) 77'
RL	5	Cristian Petre	(substituted off) 80'
LL	4	Valentin Ursache
TP	3	Paulică Ion	(substituted off) 68'
HK	2	Marius Țincu (c)	(substituted off) 68'
LP	1	Mihai Lazăr
Replacements:
HK	16	Bogdan Zebega	(substituted in) 68'
PR	17	Silviu Florea	(substituted in) 68'
LK	18	Valentin Popârlan	(substituted in) 80'
FL	19	Stelian Burcea	(substituted in) 77'
SH	20	Florin Surugiu	(substituted in) 52'
CE	21	Ionel Cazan	(substituted in) 52'
FB	22	Florin Vlaicu	(substituted in) 59'
Coach:
Romeo Gontineac

Man of the Match:
Marius Țincu (Romania)

Touch judges:
Vinny Munro (New Zealand)
Tim Hayes (Wales)
Television match official:
Shaun Veldsman (South Africa)

=== Argentina vs England ===
10 September 2011
20:30

Argentina	9–13	England
Pen: Contepomi (1/2) 7'; Rodríguez (2/7) 20', 45'	Report	Try: Youngs 67' c Con: Wilkinson (1/1); Pen: Wilkinson (2/7) 12', 75'

Otago Stadium, Dunedin
Attendance: 30,700
Referee: Bryce Lawrence (New Zealand)

FB	15	Martín Rodríguez
RW	14	Horacio Agulla
OC	13	Gonzalo Tiesi	(substituted off) 37'
IC	12	Santiago Fernández
LW	11	Gonzalo Camacho
FH	10	Felipe Contepomi (c)	(substituted off) 27'
SH	9	Nicolás Vergallo
N8	8	Juan Martín Fernández Lobbe
OF	7	Juan Manuel Leguizamón	(substituted off) 79'
BF	6	Julio Farías Cabello	(substituted off) 69'
RL	5	Patricio Albacete
LL	4	Manuel Carizza
TP	3	Juan Figallo			(substituted off) 58'	(substituted in) 78'
HK	2	Mario Ledesma	(substituted off) 56'
LP	1	Rodrigo Roncero	18' to 19'			(substituted off) 78'
Replacements:
HK	16	Agustín Creevy	(substituted in) 56'
PR	17	Martín Scelzo	(substituted in) 18'	(substituted off) 19'	(substituted in) 58'
LK	18	Mariano Galarza	(substituted in) 79'
FL	19	Alejandro Campos	(substituted in) 69'
SH	20	Alfredo Lalanne
CE	21	Marcelo Bosch	(substituted in) 27'
WG	22	Juan Imhoff	(substituted in) 37'
Coach:
Santiago Phelan

FB	15	Ben Foden
RW	14	Chris Ashton
OC	13	Manu Tuilagi
IC	12	Mike Tindall (c)
LW	11	Delon Armitage
FH	10	Jonny Wilkinson
SH	9	Richard Wigglesworth		(substituted off) 50'
N8	8	Nick Easter
OF	7	James Haskell
BF	6	Tom Croft
RL	5	Courtney Lawes
LL	4	Louis Deacon		(substituted off) 66'
TP	3	Dan Cole	(yellow card) 35'
HK	2	Steve Thompson		(substituted off) 63'
LP	1	Andrew Sheridan		(substituted off) 62'
Replacements:
HK	16	Dylan Hartley		(substituted in) 63'
PR	17	Matt Stevens		(substituted in) 62'
LK	18	Tom Palmer		(substituted in) 66'
FL	19	Tom Wood
SH	20	Ben Youngs		(substituted in) 50'
FH	21	Toby Flood
WG	22	Matt Banahan
Team Manager:
Martin Johnson

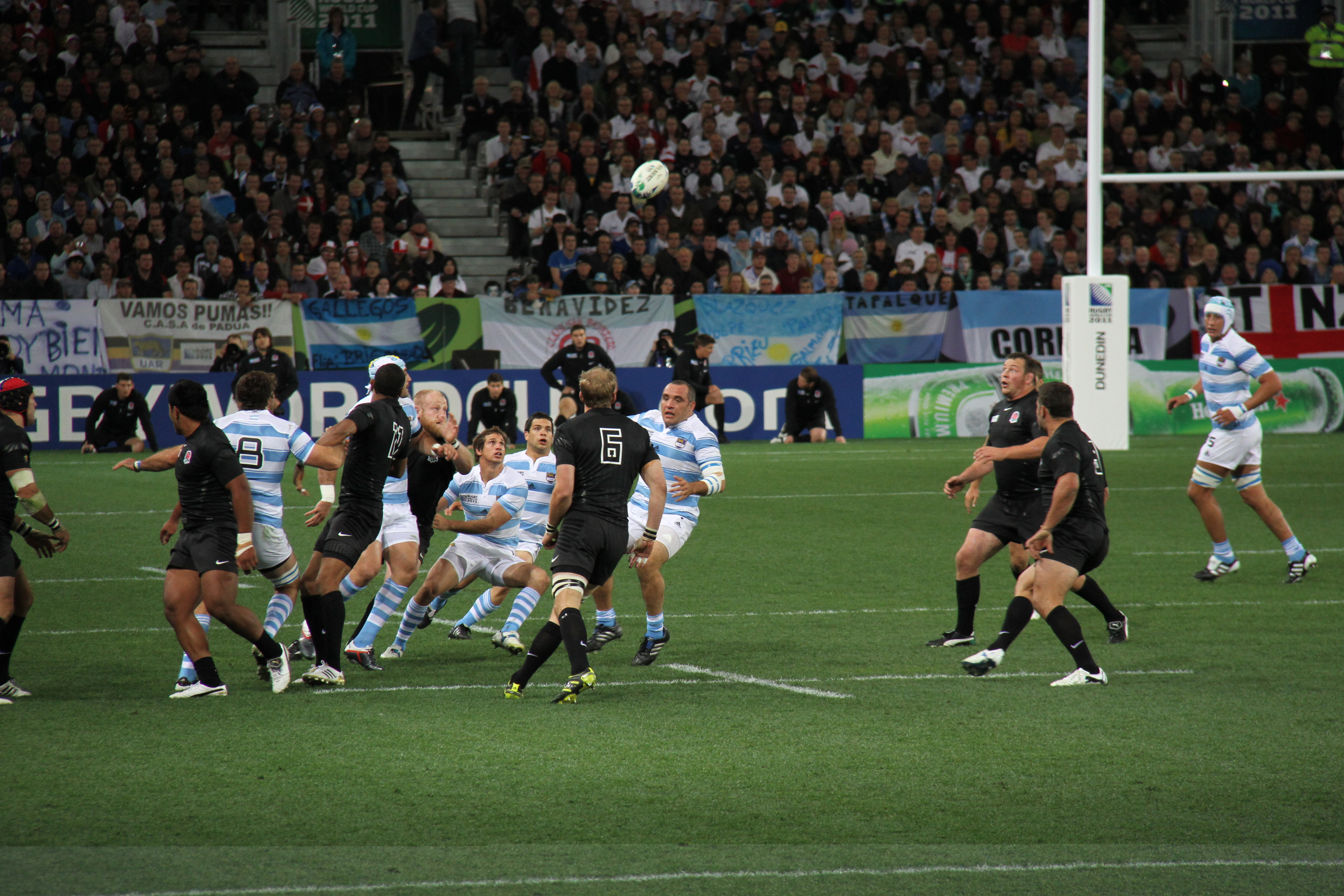

Man of the Match:
Juan Martín Fernández Lobbe (Argentina)

Touch judges:
Romain Poite (France)
Simon McDowell (Ireland)
Television match official:
Matt Goddard (Australia)

=== Scotland vs Georgia ===
14 September 2011
19:30

Scotland	15–6	Georgia
Pen: Parks (4/7) 24', 34', 71', 76'; Drop: Parks (1/1) 39'	Report	Pen: Kvirikashvili (2/2) 17', 73'

Rugby Park Stadium, Invercargill
Attendance: 10,267
Referee: George Clancy (Ireland)

FB	15	Rory Lamont	(substituted off) 70'
RW	14	Max Evans
OC	13	Nick De Luca
IC	12	Graeme Morrison
LW	11	Sean Lamont
FH	10	Dan Parks
SH	9	Rory Lawson (c)
N8	8	Kelly Brown
OF	7	Ross Rennie
BF	6	Alasdair Strokosch
RL	5	Jim Hamilton
LL	4	Nathan Hines	(substituted off) 70'
TP	3	Euan Murray
HK	2	Ross Ford
LP	1	Allan Jacobsen
Replacements:
HK	16	Dougie Hall
PR	17	Geoff Cross
PR	18	Alasdair Dickinson
LK	19	Richie Gray	(substituted in) 70'
N8	20	Richie Vernon
SH	21	Chris Cusiter
FB	22	Chris Paterson	(substituted in) 70'
Coach:
(England) Andy Robinson

FB	15	Revaz Gigauri
RW	14	Irakli Machkhaneli
OC	13	David Kacharava
IC	12	Tedo Zibzibadze
LW	11	Alexander Todua	(substituted off) 66'
FH	10	Merab Kvirikashvili
SH	9	Irakli Abuseridze (c)
N8	8	Dimitri Basilaia	(substituted off) 64'
OF	7	Mamuka Gorgodze
BF	6	Shalva Sutiashvili
RL	5	Vakhtang Maisuradze	(substituted off) 48'
LL	4	Levan Datunashvili
TP	3	Davit Zirakashvili	(substituted off) 55'
HK	2	Jaba Bregvadze	(substituted off) 64'
LP	1	Davit Khinchagishvili
Replacements:
HK	16	Akvsenti Giorgadze	(substituted in) 64'
PR	17	Davit Kubriashvili	(substituted in) 55'
FL	18	Giorgi Chkhaidze	(substituted in) 48'
FL	19	Viktor Kolelishvili	(substituted in) 64'
SH	20	Bidzina Samkharadze
FH	21	Lasha Khmaladze
FB	22	Malkhaz Urjukashvili	(substituted in) 66'
Coach:
(Scotland) Richard Dixon

Man of the Match:
Kelly Brown (Scotland)

Touch judges:
Simon McDowell (Ireland)
Tim Hayes (Wales)
Television match official:
Shaun Veldsman (South Africa)

=== Argentina vs Romania ===
17 September 2011
15:30

Argentina	43–8	Romania
Try: Fernández 5' c Leguizamón 9' c Figallo 21' m González Amorosino 30' c Imhoff 64' c Fessia 72' c Con: Rodríguez (5/6); Pen: Rodríguez (1/3) 44'	Report	Try: Cazan 32' m Pen: Dimofte (1/2) 14'

Rugby Park Stadium, Invercargill
Attendance: 12,605
Referee: Steve Walsh (Australia)

FB	15	Lucas González Amorosino
RW	14	Gonzalo Camacho	(substituted off) 50'
OC	13	Marcelo Bosch
IC	12	Martin Rodríguez
LW	11	Horacio Agulla
FH	10	Santiago Fernández	(substituted off) 75'
SH	9	Nicolás Vergallo	(substituted off) 65'
N8	8	Juan Martín Fernández Lobbe (c)
OF	7	Juan Manuel Leguizamón	(substituted off) 58'
BF	6	Julio Farías Cabello
RL	5	Patricio Albacete
LL	4	Manuel Carizza
TP	3	Juan Figallo
HK	2	Mario Ledesma	(substituted off) 44'
LP	1	Rodrigo Roncero	(substituted off) 58'
Replacements:
HK	16	Agustín Creevy	(substituted in) 44'
PR	17	Martín Scelzo	(substituted in) 58'
LK	18	Mariano Galarza		(substituted in) 73'
FL	19	Genaro Fessia	(substituted in) 58'	(substituted off) 73'
SH	20	Alfredo Lalanne	(substituted in) 65'
FH	21	Nicolás Sánchez	(substituted in) 75'
WG	22	Juan Imhoff	(substituted in) 50'
Coach:
Santiago Phelan

FB	15	Iulian Dumitraș		(substituted off) 48'
RW	14	Mădălin Lemnaru
OC	13	Csaba Gál
IC	12	Constantin Gheară
LW	11	Ionel Cazan
FH	10	Ionuț Dimofte
SH	9	Florin Surugiu		(substituted off) 68'
N8	8	Daniel Carpo		(substituted off) 54'
OF	7	Ovidiu Tonița
BF	6	Mihai Macovei		(substituted off) 75'
RL	5	Cristian Petre		(substituted off) 48'
LL	4	Valentin Ursache
TP	3	Paulică Ion
HK	2	Marius Țincu (c)
LP	1	Mihai Lazăr	(yellow card) 54'
Replacements:
HK	16	Bogdan Zebega
PR	17	Silviu Florea		(substituted in) 54'
LK	18	Valentin Popârlan		(substituted in) 48'
FL	19	Daniel Ianuș		(substituted in) 75'
SH	20	Valentin Calafeteanu		(substituted in) 68'
FH	21	Dănuț Dumbravă
FB	22	Florin Vlaicu		(substituted in) 48'
Coach:
Romeo Gontineac

Man of the Match:
Lucas González Amorosino (Argentina)

Touch judges:
Jonathan Kaplan (South Africa)
Simon McDowell (Ireland)
Television match official:
Shaun Veldsman (South Africa)

=== England vs Georgia ===
18 September 2011
18:00

England	41–10	Georgia
Try: Hape (2) 4' c, 21' c Armitage 47' m Tuilagi 62' c Ashton (2) 65' c, 80' m Con: Flood (4/6); Pen: Flood (1/1) 35'	Report	Try: Basilaia 40' c Con: Kvirikashvili (1/1); Pen: Kvirikashvili (1/6) 27'

Otago Stadium, Dunedin
Attendance: 20,117
Referee: Jonathan Kaplan (South Africa)

FB	15	Ben Foden
RW	14	Chris Ashton
OC	13	Manu Tuilagi		(substituted off) 67'
IC	12	Shontayne Hape
LW	11	Delon Armitage
FH	10	Toby Flood
SH	9	Ben Youngs		(substituted off) 67'
N8	8	Nick Easter
OF	7	Lewis Moody (c)		(substituted off) 58'
BF	6	Tom Wood		(substituted off) 40'	(substituted in) 49'
RL	5	Tom Palmer
LL	4	Simon Shaw
TP	3	Dan Cole		(substituted off) 63'	(substituted in) 75'
HK	2	Dylan Hartley	(yellow card) 39'			(substituted off) 61'
LP	1	Matt Stevens			(substituted off) 75'
Replacements:
HK	16	Steve Thompson		(substituted in) 40'	(substituted off) 49'	(substituted in) 61'
PR	17	Alex Corbisiero		(substituted in) 63'
FL	18	Tom Croft		(substituted in) 58'
FL	19	James Haskell
SH	20	Joe Simpson		(substituted in) 67'
FH	21	Jonny Wilkinson
WG	22	Matt Banahan		(substituted in) 67'
Coach:
Martin Johnson

FB	15	Revaz Gigauri
RW	14	Irakli Machkhaneli	(substituted off) 40'
OC	13	Davit Kacharava
IC	12	Tedo Zibzibadze
LW	11	Alexander Todua			(substituted off) 67'
FH	10	Merab Kvirikashvili
SH	9	Irakli Abuseridze (c)	(substituted off) 63'
N8	8	Dimitri Basilaia	(substituted off) 61'
OF	7	Mamuka Gorgodze
BF	6	Shalva Sutiashvili	(substituted off) 31'
RL	5	Vakhtang Maisuradze
LL	4	Ilia Zedginidze	6' to 16'
TP	3	Davit Kubriashvili	(substituted off) 23'
HK	2	Jaba Bregvadze
LP	1	Davit Khinchagishvili	(substituted off) 56'
Replacements:
PR	16	Goderdzi Shvelidze	(substituted in) 56'
PR	17	Davit Zirakashvili	(substituted in) 23'
LK	18	Levan Datunashvili	(substituted in) 6'	(substituted off) 16'	(substituted in) 67'
FL	19	Giorgi Chkhaidze	(substituted in) 31'
SH	20	Bidzina Samkharadze	(substituted in) 63'
FL	21	Givi Berishvili	(substituted in) 61'
FH	22	Lasha Khmaladze	(substituted in) 40'
Coach:
(Scotland) Richard Dixon

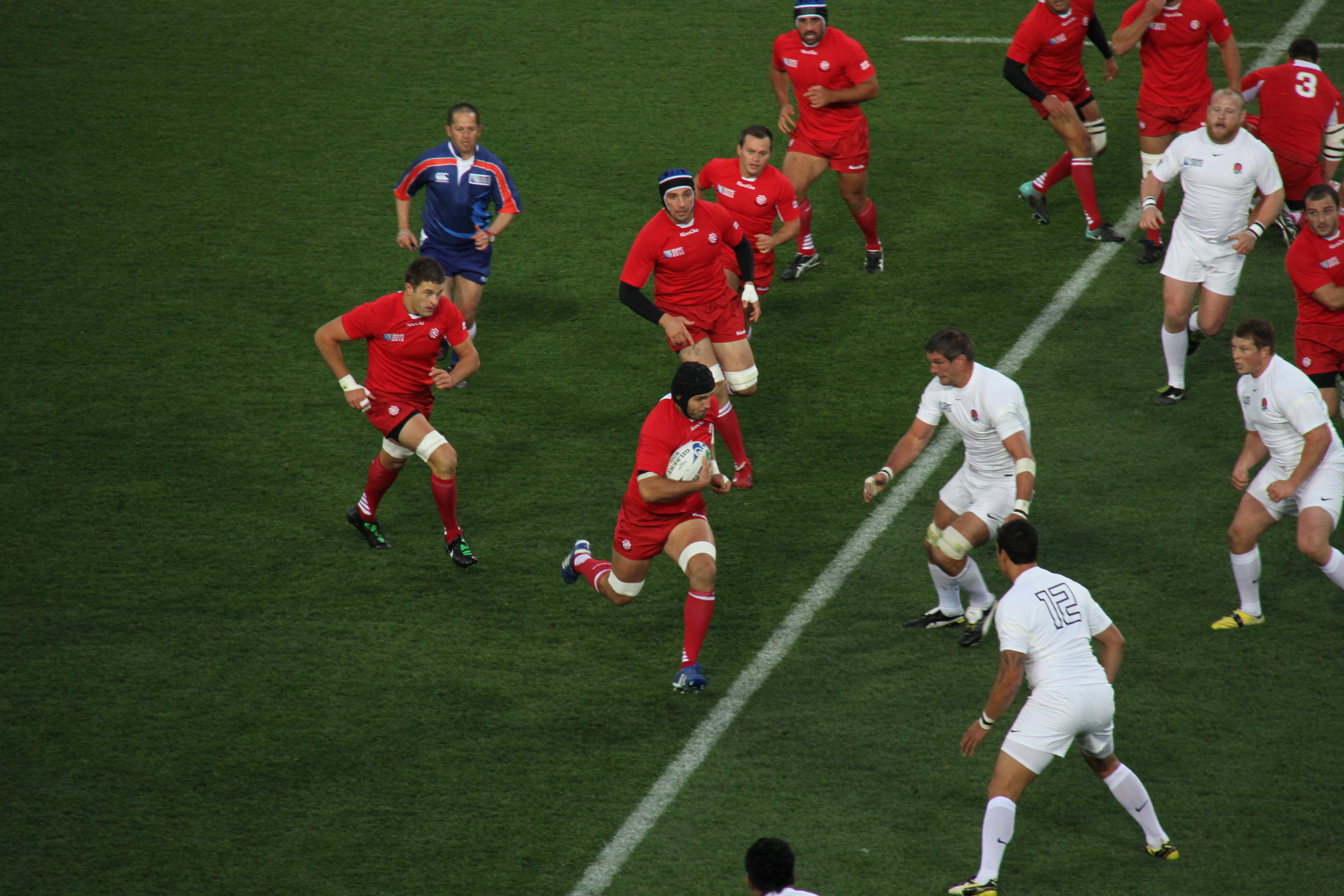

Man of the Match:
Mamuka Gorgodze (Georgia)

Touch judges:
Steve Walsh (Australia)
Chris Pollock (New Zealand)
Television match official:
Shaun Veldsman (South Africa)

=== England vs Romania ===
24 September 2011
18:00

England	67–3	Romania
Try: Cueto (3) 15' m, 22' c, 26' m Ashton (3) 32' c, 35' c, 70' c Youngs 41' m Foden 49' c Tuilagi 61' c Croft 67' c Con: Wilkinson (3/5); Flood (4/5); Pen: Wilkinson (1/1) 2'	Report	Pen: Dumbravă (1/5) 38'

Otago Stadium, Dunedin
Attendance: 25,687
Referee: Romain Poite (France)

FB	15	Ben Foden	(substituted off) 52'
RW	14	Chris Ashton
OC	13	Manu Tuilagi
IC	12	Mike Tindall
LW	11	Mark Cueto
FH	10	Jonny Wilkinson	(substituted off) 40'
SH	9	Ben Youngs	(substituted off) 62'
N8	8	James Haskell
OF	7	Lewis Moody (c)	(substituted off) 62'
BF	6	Tom Croft
RL	5	Tom Palmer
LL	4	Louis Deacon	(substituted off) 59'
TP	3	Dan Cole	(substituted off) 40'	(substituted in) 59'
HK	2	Steve Thompson	(substituted off) 51'
LP	1	Alex Corbisiero		(substituted off) 59'
Replacements:
HK	16	Lee Mears	(substituted in) 51'
PR	17	David Wilson	(substituted in) 40'
LK	18	Simon Shaw	(substituted in) 59'
FL	19	Tom Wood	(substituted in) 62'
SH	20	Richard Wigglesworth	(substituted in) 62'
FH	21	Toby Flood	(substituted in) 40'
WG	22	Delon Armitage	(substituted in) 52'
Coach:
Martin Johnson

FB	15	Florin Vlaicu	(substituted off) 71'
RW	14	Ștefan Ciuntu
OC	13	Ionel Cazan	(substituted off) 40'
IC	12	Iulian Dumitraș
LW	11	Adrian Apostol
FH	10	Dănuț Dumbravă
SH	9	Lucian Sîrbu	(substituted off) 41'
N8	8	Ovidiu Tonița
OF	7	Cosmin Rațiu	(substituted off) 60'
BF	6	Stelian Burcea
RL	5	Cristian Petre (c)	(substituted off) 52'
LL	4	Valentin Popârlan
TP	3	Silviu Florea	(substituted off) 62'
HK	2	Bogdan Zebega	(substituted off) 51'
LP	1	Nicolae Nere
Replacements:
HK	16	Marius Țincu	(substituted in) 51'
PR	17	Paulică Ion	(substituted in) 62'
FL	18	Mihai Macovei	(substituted in) 52'
FL	19	Daniel Ianuș	(substituted in) 60'
SH	20	Valentin Calafeteanu	(substituted in) 41'
CE	21	Csaba Gál	(substituted in) 40'
WG	22	Cătălin Nicolae	(substituted in) 71'
Coach:
Romeo Gontineac

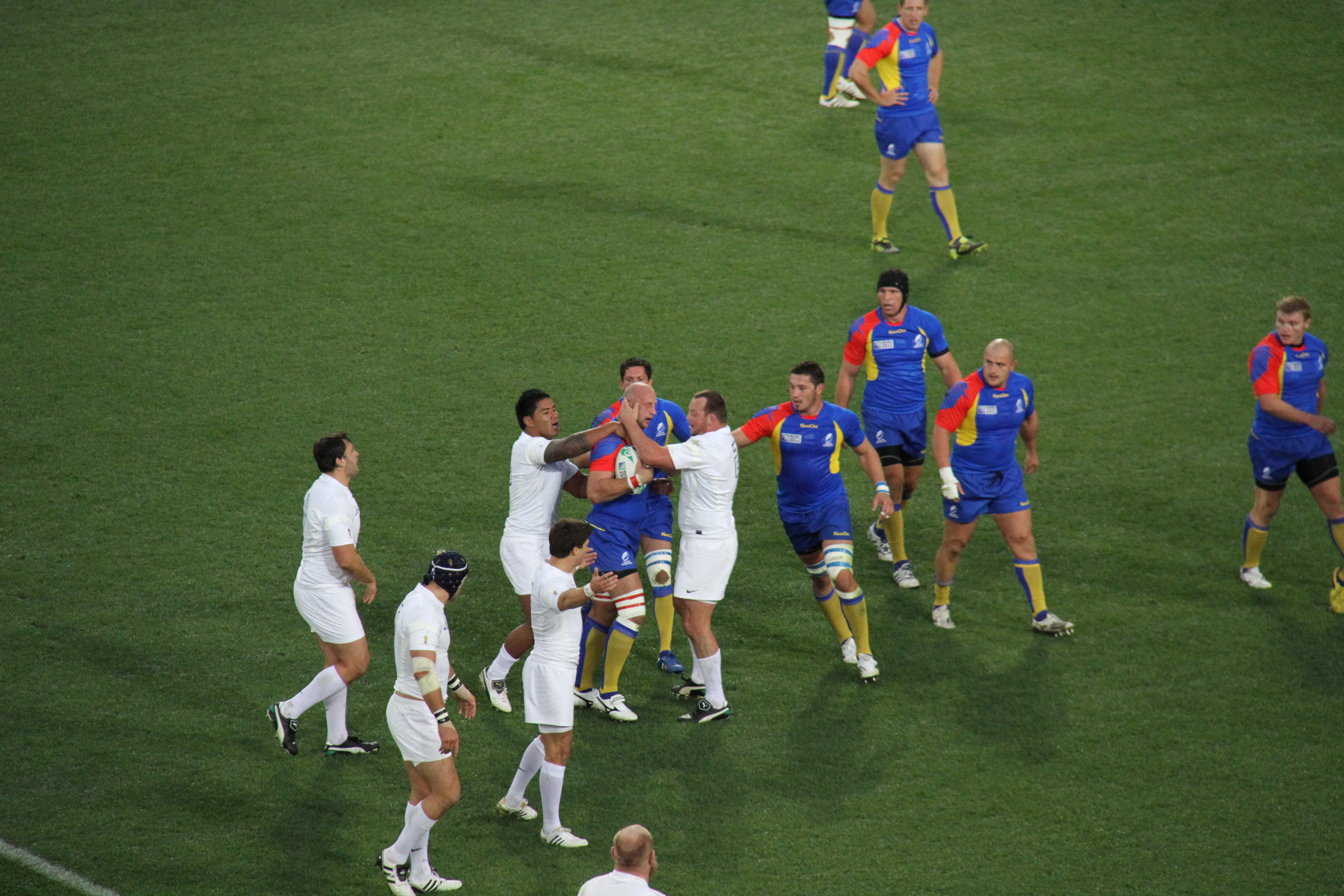

Man of the Match:
Mark Cueto (England)

Touch judges:
Jonathan Kaplan (South Africa)
Simon McDowell (Ireland)
Television match official:
Shaun Veldsman (South Africa)

=== Argentina vs Scotland ===
25 September 2011
20:30

Argentina	13–12	Scotland
Try: González Amorosino 73' c Con: Contepomi (1/1); Pen: Contepomi (2/5) 19', 64'	Report	Pen: Paterson (1/2) 35'; Jackson (1/1) 38'; Drop: Jackson (1/1) 65'; Parks (1/2) 72'

Wellington Regional Stadium, Wellington
Attendance: 26,937
Referee: Wayne Barnes (England)

FB	15	Martín Rodríguez	(substituted off) 64'
RW	14	Gonzalo Camacho
OC	13	Marcelo Bosch
IC	12	Felipe Contepomi (c)
LW	11	Horacio Agulla
FH	10	Santiago Fernández
SH	9	Nicolás Vergallo
N8	8	Juan Martín Fernández Lobbe	(substituted off) 30'
OF	7	Juan Manuel Leguizamón
BF	6	Julio Farías Cabello
RL	5	Patricio Albacete
LL	4	Manuel Carizza
TP	3	Juan Figallo
HK	2	Mario Ledesma	(substituted off) 76'
LP	1	Rodrigo Roncero	(substituted off) 35'
Replacements:
HK	16	Agustín Creevy	(substituted in) 76'
PR	17	Martín Scelzo	(substituted in) 35'
LK	18	Mariano Galarza
FL	19	Genaro Fessia	(substituted in) 30'
SH	20	Alfredo Lalanne
FB	21	Lucas González Amorosino	(substituted in) 64'
WG	22	Juan Imhoff
Coach:
Santiago Phelan

FB	15	Chris Paterson
RW	14	Max Evans
OC	13	Nick De Luca
IC	12	Graeme Morrison
LW	11	Sean Lamont
FH	10	Ruaridh Jackson	(substituted off) 70'
SH	9	Rory Lawson (c)	(substituted off) 61'
N8	8	Kelly Brown	(substituted off) 78'
OF	7	John Barclay
BF	6	Ally Strokosch
RL	5	Jim Hamilton
LL	4	Richie Gray	(substituted off) 57'
TP	3	Geoff Cross		(substituted off) 75'
HK	2	Ross Ford	(substituted off) 70'
LP	1	Allan Jacobsen	(substituted off) 61'	(substituted in) 75'
Replacements:
HK	16	Dougie Hall	(substituted in) 70'
PR	17	Alasdair Dickinson	(substituted in) 61'
LK	18	Nathan Hines	(substituted in) 57'
N8	19	Richie Vernon	(substituted in) 78'
SH	20	Mike Blair	(substituted in) 61'
FH	21	Dan Parks	(substituted in) 70'
WG	22	Simon Danielli
Coach:
(England) Andy Robinson

Man of the Match:
Ruaridh Jackson (Scotland)

Touch judges:
Nigel Owens (Wales)
Chris Pollock (New Zealand)
Television match official:
Shaun Veldsman (South Africa)

=== Georgia vs Romania ===
28 September 2011
19:30

Georgia	25–9	Romania
Try: Gorgodze 56' c Con: Kvirikashvili (1/1); Pen: Kvirikashvili (5/7) 9', 24', 31', 36', 70'; Urjukashvili (1/1) 76'	Report	Pen: Dumbravă (2/4) 12', 34'; Vlaicu (1/1) 72'

Arena Manawatu, Palmerston North
Attendance: 13,228
Referee: Dave Pearson (England)

FB	15	Lasha Khmaladze
RW	14	Revaz Gigauri	(substituted off) 72'
OC	13	David Kacharava
IC	12	Tedo Zibzibadze
LW	11	Alexander Todua
FH	10	Merab Kvirikashvili	(substituted off) 75'
SH	9	Irakli Abuseridze (c)	(substituted off) 75'
N8	8	Dimitri Basilaia
OF	7	Mamuka Gorgodze	(substituted off) 74'
BF	6	Giorgi Chkhaidze
RL	5	Vakhtang Maisuradze
LL	4	Ilia Zedginidze	(substituted off) 67'
TP	3	David Zirakashvili
HK	2	Jaba Bregvadze	(substituted off) 67'
LP	1	David Khinchagishvili	(substituted off) 68'
Replacements:
PR	16	Goderdzi Shvelidze	(substituted in) 67'
PR	17	Vasil Kakovin	(substituted in) 68'
LK	18	Levan Datunashvili	(substituted in) 67'
FL	19	Givi Berishvili	(substituted in) 74'
SH	20	Bidzina Samkharadze	(substituted in) 75'
WG	21	Irakli Chkhikvadze	(substituted in) 72'
FB	22	Malkhaz Urjukashvili	(substituted in) 75'
Coach:
(Scotland) Richard Dixon

FB	15	Iulian Dumitraș	(substituted off) 58'
RW	14	Ștefan Ciuntu	(substituted off) 41'
OC	13	Csaba Gál
IC	12	Ionuț Dimofte
LW	11	Mădălin Lemnaru
FH	10	Dănuț Dumbravă	(substituted off) 69'
SH	9	Florin Surugiu
N8	8	Daniel Carpo
OF	7	Ovidiu Tonița	(substituted off) 68'
BF	6	Mihai Macovei
RL	5	Cristian Petre	(substituted off) 68'
LL	4	Valentin Ursache
TP	3	Paulică Ion	(substituted off) 68'
HK	2	Marius Țincu (c)
LP	1	Mihai Lazăr
Replacements:
HK	16	Bogdan Zebega
PR	17	Silviu Florea	(substituted in) 68'
LK	18	Valentin Popârlan	(substituted in) 68'
FL	19	Daniel Ianuș	(substituted in) 68'
SH	20	Valentin Calafeteanu	(substituted in) 69'
CE	21	Constantin Gheară	(substituted in) 41'
FB	22	Florin Vlaicu	(substituted in) 58'
Coach:
Romeo Gontineac

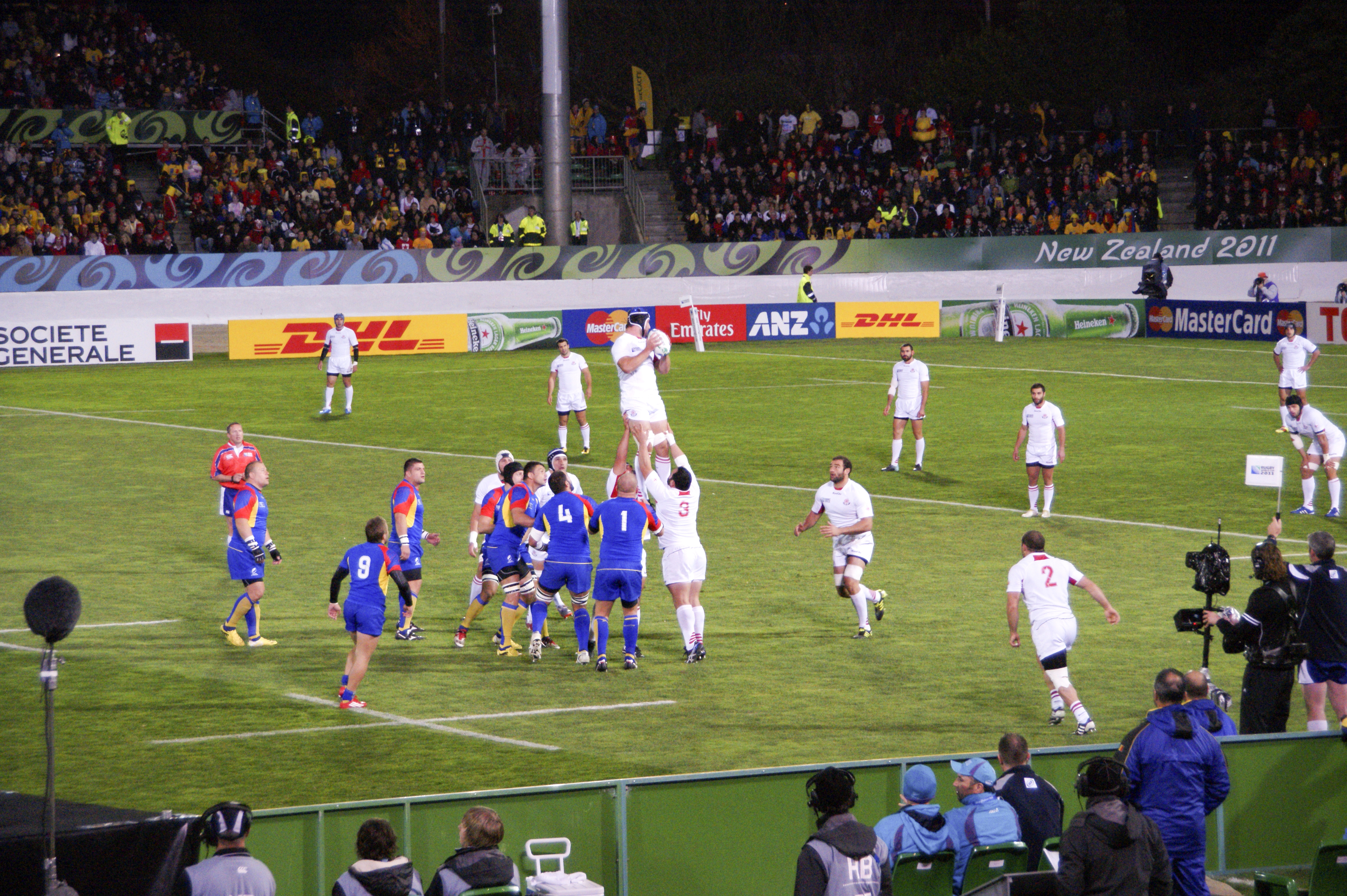

Man of the Match:
Mamuka Gorgodze (Georgia)

Touch judges:
Romain Poite (France)
Vinny Munro (New Zealand)
Television match official:
Giulio De Santis (Italy)

=== England vs Scotland ===
1 October 2011
20:30

England	16–12	Scotland
Try: Ashton 78' c Con: Flood (1/1); Pen: Wilkinson (2/5) 34', 63'; Drop: Wilkinson (1/2) 57'	Report	Pen: Paterson (2/2) 9', 55'; Parks (1/1) 17'; Drop: Parks (1/3) 40+'

Eden Park, Auckland
Attendance: 58,213
Referee: Craig Joubert (South Africa)

FB	15	Ben Foden
RW	14	Chris Ashton
OC	13	Manu Tuilagi
IC	12	Mike Tindall	(substituted off) 71'
LW	11	Delon Armitage
FH	10	Jonny Wilkinson	(substituted off) 75'
SH	9	Ben Youngs	(substituted off) 73'
N8	8	James Haskell			(substituted off) 64'
OF	7	Lewis Moody (c)	53' to 63'
BF	6	Tom Croft
RL	5	Courtney Lawes	(substituted off) 57'
LL	4	Louis Deacon
TP	3	Dan Cole
HK	2	Steve Thompson	(substituted off) 67'
LP	1	Matt Stevens	(substituted off) 72'
Replacements:
HK	16	Dylan Hartley	(substituted in) 67'
PR	17	Alex Corbisiero	(substituted in) 72'
LK	18	Tom Palmer	(substituted in) 57'
N8	19	Nick Easter	(substituted in) 53'	(substituted off) 63'	(substituted in) 64'
SH	20	Richard Wigglesworth	(substituted in) 73'
FH	21	Toby Flood	(substituted in) 71'
WG	22	Matt Banahan	(substituted in) 75'
Coach:
Martin Johnson

FB	15	Chris Paterson
RW	14	Max Evans	(substituted off) 40'
OC	13	Joe Ansbro
IC	12	Sean Lamont
LW	11	Simon Danielli
FH	10	Ruaridh Jackson	(substituted off) 5'
SH	9	Mike Blair	(substituted off) 71'
N8	8	Richie Vernon
OF	7	John Barclay	(substituted off) 63'
BF	6	Ally Strokosch	(substituted off) 63'
RL	5	Alastair Kellock (c)
LL	4	Richie Gray
TP	3	Euan Murray
HK	2	Ross Ford
LP	1	Allan Jacobsen	(substituted off) 67'
Replacements:
HK	16	Scott Lawson
PR	17	Alasdair Dickinson	(substituted in) 67'
LK	18	Nathan Hines	(substituted in) 63'
N8	19	Ross Rennie	(substituted in) 63'
SH	20	Chris Cusiter	(substituted in) 71'
FH	21	Dan Parks	(substituted in) 5'
CE	22	Nick de Luca	(substituted in) 40'
Coach:
(England) Andy Robinson

Man of the Match:
Dan Parks (Scotland)

Touch judges:
Nigel Owens (Wales)
Jérôme Garcès (France)
Television match official:
Tim Hayes (Wales)

=== Argentina vs Georgia ===
2 October 2011
13:00

Argentina	25–7	Georgia
Try: Imhoff 32' m Contepomi 68' c Gosio 79' c Con: Contepomi (1/2); Bosch (1/1); Pen: Contepomi (2/4) 51', 60'	Report	Try: Khmaladze 39' c Con: Urjukashvili (1/1)

Arena Manawatu, Palmerston North
Attendance: 13,754
Referee: Alain Rolland (Ireland)

FB	15	Lucas González Amorosino
RW	14	Horacio Agulla	(substituted off) 66'
OC	13	Marcelo Bosch
IC	12	Felipe Contepomi (c)	(substituted off) 72'
LW	11	Juan Imhoff
FH	10	Santiago Fernández
SH	9	Nicolás Vergallo	(substituted off) 70'
N8	8	Leonardo Senatore	(substituted off) 65'
OF	7	Juan Manuel Leguizamón
BF	6	Julio Farías Cabello
RL	5	Patricio Albacete
LL	4	Mariano Galarza	(substituted off) 71'
TP	3	Juan Figallo	(substituted off) 65'
HK	2	Mario Ledesma	(substituted off) 63'
LP	1	Marcos Ayerza
Replacements:
HK	16	Agustín Creevy	(substituted in) 63'
PR	17	Martín Scelzo	(substituted in) 65'
LK	18	Tomás Vallejos	(substituted in) 71'
FL	19	Genaro Fessia	(substituted in) 65'
SH	20	Alfredo Lalanne	(substituted in) 70'
CE	21	Agustin Gosio	(substituted in) 72'
FB	22	Martín Rodríguez	(substituted in) 66'
Coach:
Santiago Phelan

FB	15	Malkhaz Urjukashvili	(substituted off) 62'
RW	14	Lexo Gugava	(substituted off) 71'
OC	13	David Kacharava
IC	12	Tedo Zibzibadze
LW	11	Alexander Todua
FH	10	Lasha Khmaladze
SH	9	Irakli Abuseridze (c)	(substituted off) 68'
N8	8	Mamuka Gorgodze
OF	7	Viktor Kolelishvili
BF	6	Giorgi Chkhaidze
RL	5	Vakhtang Maisuradze	(substituted off) 69'
LL	4	Levan Datunashvili	(substituted off) 69'
TP	3	Davit Kubriashvili		(substituted off) 63'
HK	2	Akvsenti Giorgadze	(substituted off) 71'	(substituted in) 79'
LP	1	Vasil Kakovin	(substituted off) 41'	(substituted in) 63'
Replacements:
HK	16	Jaba Bregvadze	(substituted in) 71'	(substituted off) 79'
PR	17	Goderdzi Shvelidze	(substituted in) 41'
LK	18	Ilia Zedginidze	(substituted in) 69'
FL	19	Giorgi Nemsadze	(substituted in) 69'
SH	20	Bidzina Samkharadze	(substituted in) 68'
FH	21	Merab Kvirikashvili	(substituted in) 62'
FH	22	Lasha Malaguradze	(substituted in) 71'
Coach:
(Scotland) Richard Dixon

Man of the Match:
Juan Manuel Leguizamón (Argentina)

Touch judges:
Dave Pearson (England)
Vinny Munro (New Zealand)
Television match official:
Giulio De Santis (Italy)
