= List of 2015 SuperLiga transfers =

This is a list of player transfers involving SuperLiga teams leading up to the 2015 season.

== Baia Mare ==
=== Players In ===
- Taniela Rawaqa from Fiji Warriors
- (Australia) Tim Buchanan from (United States) San Francisco Golden Gate RFC
- (Australia) Nigel Genia from (Australia) Queensland Reds A
- (Romania) Adrian Apostol from (Romania) Farul Constanta
- (South Africa) Dumani Mtya from (Romania) CSM București
- (Australia) John Leiataua from (England) Westcombe Park
- (Australia) Keegan Shefton from (Australia) Souths Rugby
- (Romania) Ionut Stan from (Italy) Rugby Botticino
- (Romania) Catalin Pastrama from (Romania) Farul Constanta
- (Tonga) Sioeli Nau from (Sri Lanka) Up Country Lions
- (Romania) Daniel Cubas from (Romania) Dinamo București (back from loan)

=== Players Out ===
- (New Zealand) Daniel Brooks to (England) Bristol Rugby
- (Romania) Stephen Hihetah to (England) Doncaster Knights
- (Romania) Csaba Gál to (Romania) U Cluj
- (South Africa) Shane Spring to (South Africa) Old Selbornians
- (Tonga) Sione Vaiomoʻunga retired
- (Romania) Georgel Catuna retired
- (Tonga) Samisoni Taufa released

== CSM București ==
=== Players In ===
- (United States) Andrew Suniula from (England) Wasps
- (Romania) Florin Vlaicu from (Romania) Farul Constanta
- (Romania) Daniel Carpo from (Romania) Timișoara Saracens
- (Tonga) Sosefo Sakalia from (Romania) Steaua București
- (Tonga) Mateo Malupo from (Romania) Timișoara Saracens
- (Romania) Alex Gordaș from (England) Worcester Warriors
- (Romania) Petru Tamba from (Romania) Farul Constanta
- (Tonga) Siale Fahiua from (Tonga) Toa ko Ma’afu
- (Australia) Junior Taavili from (Australia) Randwick DRUFC
- (Romania) Vlad Badalicescu from (Romania) Farul Constanta
- (Romania) Nicolae Nere from (Romania) Farul Constanta
- (Romania) Silviu Vasiliu from (Romania) U Cluj
- (Tonga) Alfred Paea from (Australia) Randwick DRUFC
- (Tonga) Atelea Okati from (Australia) Penrith Emus Rugby
- (Samoa) Heroshi Tea from (New Zealand) West Coast RFC
- (Romania) Onal Agiacai from (Romania) Farul Constanta
- (Samoa) Phillip Tuigamala from (Australia) Manurewa Marlins
- (Moldova) Andrei Romanov from (Russia) Krasny Yar
- (Romania) Kamil Sobota from (Romania) U Cluj

=== Players Out ===
- (Romania) Otar Turashvili to (France) US Colomiers
- (Romania) Marius Antonescu to (France) Tarbes Pyrénées Rugby
- (Fiji) Jonetani Ralulu to (France) Chambéry
- (Australia) Keith Masima to (France) La Voulte-Valence
- (South Africa) Dumani Mtya to (Romania) Baia Mare
- (Romania) Andrei Filip to (Romania) Steaua București
- (Romania) Tudorel Bratu to (Romania) Dinamo București
- (Romania) Silviu Budileanu to (Romania) Dinamo București
- (Romania) Cristian Onofrei to (Romania) Dinamo București
- (Romania) Andrei Florescu to (Romania) Steaua București
- (Samoa) Willie Tooala to (France) Bédarrides
- (Australia) Dylan Takato-Simpson to (Australia) Souths Rugby
- (Australia) Sam Zlatevski retired
- (South Africa) Thabiso Mngomezulu released
- (Romania) Nicolae Barbu released
- (Romania) Bogdan Petreanu released
- (Romania) Alberto Tutunea released
- (Romania) Petre Zapan released

== U Cluj ==
=== Players In ===
- (Romania) Bogdan Bălan from (France) Lyon OU
- (Romania) Csaba Gál from (Romania) Baia Mare
- (France) Mohamed Belguidoum from (France) SC Albi
- (Namibia) Renaud Van Neel from (Romania) Farul Constanta
- (Georgia (country)) Levan Genebashvili from (Georgia (country)) RC Locomotive Tbilisi
- (Tonga) Taniela Halafihi from (Tonga)
- (Romania) Vlad Toma from (Romania) Stiinta Petrosani

=== Players Out ===
- (Romania) Silviu Vasiliu to (Romania) CSM București
- (Romania) Kamil Sobota to (Romania) CSM București
- (Romania) Eduard Ciaparii to (Romania) Timișoara Saracens
- (Romania) Samuel Cira to (Romania) Timișoara Saracens
- (Romania) Bogdan Ionescu retired

== Dinamo București ==
=== Players In ===
- (Namibia) Eugene Jantjies from (Romania) Farul Constanta
- (Tonga) Tevita Iketau from (New Zealand) Nedlands Rugby
- (Romania) Silviu Budileanu from (Romania) CSM București
- (Romania) Cristian Onofrei from (Romania) CSM București
- (Romania) Andrei Florescu from (Romania) CSM București
- (Romania) Dragos Doru from (Romania) Steaua București

=== Players Out ===
- (Romania) Vlad Tanase to (Romania) Steaua București
- (Romania) Marian Arion to (Romania) Steaua București
- (Romania) Daniel Cubas to (Romania) Baia Mare back from loan
- (Moldova) Roman Rotundu to (Moldova) Sporting-ASEM
- (Romania) Daniel Vajea to (Romania) CSM București U23
- (Romania) Andrei Borz to (Romania) Stiinta Petrosani
- (Romania) Alexandru Dumbrava released
- (Romania) Marius Lacatusu released
- (Romania) Cosmin Stan released

== Steaua București ==
=== Players In ===
- (Fiji) Malakai Ravulo from (Romania) Farul Constanta
- (Fiji) Nemia Kenatale from (Romania) Farul Constanta
- (Romania) Robert Neagu from (Romania) Farul Constanta
- (Romania) Andrei Filip from (France) Saint-Jean-d'Angély
- (Romania) Sabin Stratila from (Romania) Farul Constanta
- (Fiji) Eseria Vueti from (Romania) Farul Constanta
- (Tonga) Vainanuma Manu from (Tonga) Marist
- (Romania) Petre Neacsu from (Romania) Farul Constanta
- (Romania) Vali-Catalin Mototolea from (Romania) Farul Constanta
- (Tonga) Niko Moa from (Tonga) Marist
- (Romania) Vlad Tanase from (Romania) Dinamo București
- (Romania) Bogdan Doroftei from (Romania) RC Barlad
- (Romania) Petru Toma from (Romania) CSS 2 Siromex

=== Players Out ===
- (Tonga) Sosefo Sakalia to (Romania) CSM București
- (Romania) Daniel Ianus to (Romania) Timișoara Saracens
- (Romania) Bogdan Neacsu to (Romania) Timișoara Saracens
- (Romania) Constantin Dumitru to (Romania) CSM București U23
- (Romania) Viorel Zamfir to (Romania) Farul Constanta
- (Tonga) Sione Nau released
- (Romania) Cristian Moisei released
- (Romania) Adrian Udroiu released
- (Romania) Adrian Dima released

== Timișoara Saracens ==
=== Players In ===
- (Romania) Andrei Rădoi from (England) Ealing Trailfinders
- (Australia) Tom Cox from (Australia) Brumbies
- (Australia) Brian Sefanaia from (Australia) North Harbour Rays
- (Romania) Daniel Ianus from (Romania) Steaua București
- (Tonga) Tevita Manumua from (England) Saracens F.C.
- (New Zealand) Hayden O'Donnell from (New Zealand) Marist Albion Christchurch
- (Romania) Bogdan Neacsu from (Romania) Steaua București
- (Romania) Eduard Ciaparii from (Romania) U Cluj
- (Romania) Samuel Cira from (Romania) U Cluj
- (Serbia) Dimitrije Avramovic from (Serbia) Rugby Club Partizan
- (Romania) Vladut Zaharia from (Romania) RC Barlad
- (Romania) Catalin Vladeanu free

=== Players Out ===
- (Romania) Cătălin Fercu to (England) Saracens F.C.
- (Moldova) Andrei Mahu to (Italy) Zebre Rugby
- (Romania) Daniel Carpo to (Romania) CSM București
- (Tonga) Mateo Malupo to (Romania) CSM București
- (Romania) Cristi Cornei to (Romania) Steaua București

== See also ==
- List of 2015–16 Premiership Rugby transfers
- List of 2015–16 RFU Championship transfers
- List of 2015–16 Pro12 transfers
- List of 2015–16 Top 14 transfers
- List of 2015–16 Super Rugby transfers
