= Cătălin Nicolae =

- Born: 22 July 1980 (age 46)
- Height: 6 ft 0 in (1.83 m)
- Weight: 185 lb (84 kg; 13.2 st)

Rugby union career
- Position: Wing
International career
Years	Team	Apps	(Points)
2003–2011	Romania	24	(10)

Cătălin Nicolae (born Bucharest, 22 July 1980) is a Romanian rugby union footballer. He plays as a wing.

Nicolae played for CSA Steaua București (Rugby), Farul Constanţa, but now he plays for Dinamo.

Nicolae has 24 caps for Romania, since his debut in 2003, with 2 tries scored, 10 points in aggregate. He was selected for the 2007 Rugby World Cup, playing a single match in the 14–10 win over Portugal. He also played at the 2011 Rugby World Cup.
