= Datunashvili =

Datunashvili (Georgian: დათუნაშვილი) is a Georgian surname. Notable people with the surname include:

- Levan Datunashvili (born 1983), Georgian rugby union player
- Zurabi Datunashvili (born 1991), Georgian sport wrestler
