= Bidzina Samkharadze =

Georgian rugby union player

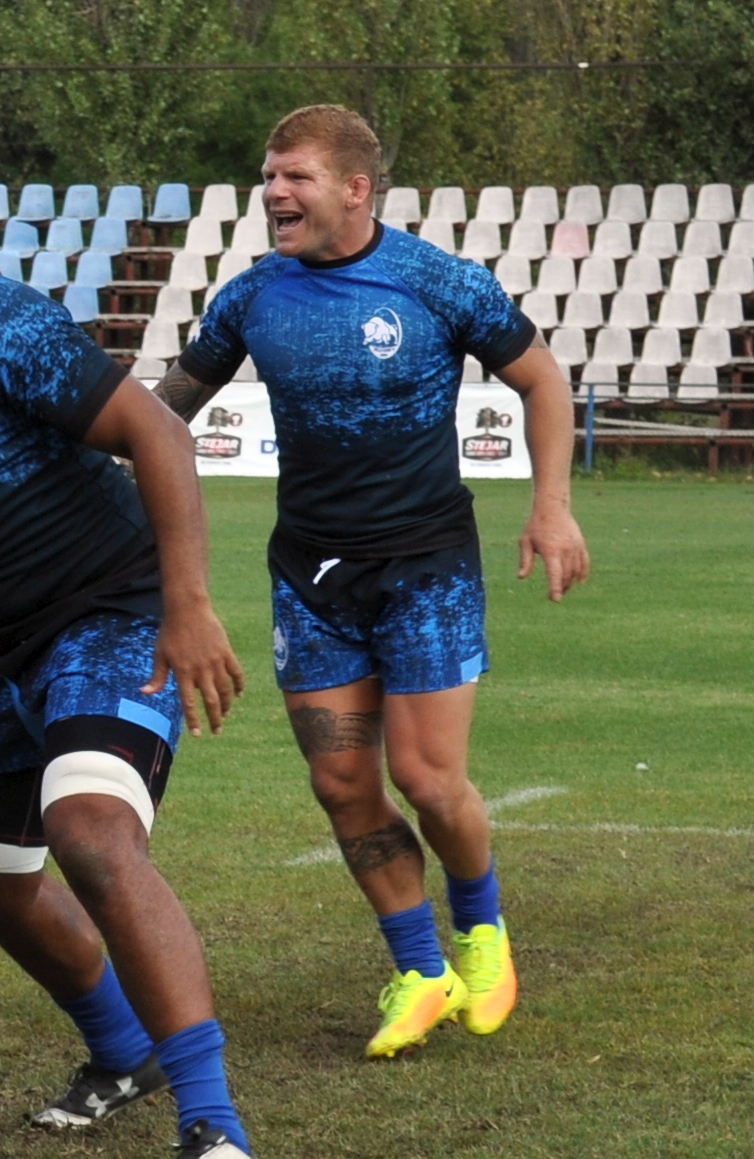
- Bidzina Samkharadze playing for CSM Baia Mare in 2017
- Full name: Bidzina Samkharadze
- Born: 2 October 1983 (age 43) Tbilisi, Georgian SSR
- Height: 1.70 m (5 ft 7 in)
- Weight: 80 kg (12 st 8 lb; 180 lb)

Rugby union career
- Position: Scrum-half
- Current team: Timișoara Saracens
Senior career
Years	Team	Apps	(Points)
?–2004	Locomotive Tbilisi		
2004–05	Walsall		
2005–06	Locomotive Tbilisi		
2006–11	Farul Constanța		
2011–12	Armia Tbilisi		
2012–13	Timișoara Saracens	2	(10)
2013–19	Știința Baia Mare	53	(60)
2019–Present	Timișoara Saracens	7	(5)
- Correct as of 28 March 2020
International career
Years	Team	Apps	(Points)
2004–Present	(Georgia (country)) Georgia	61	(30)
- Correct as of 28 March 2020

Bidzina Samkharadze (Georgian: ბიძინა სამხარაძე, born 2 October 1983 in Tbilisi) is a Georgian rugby union player who plays as a scrum-half for professional SuperLiga club Timișoara Saracens.

== Clubs career ==
During his career, Samkharadze played for Locomotive Tbilisi and Armia Tbilisi in Georgia, Walsall RFC in England and mostly in Romania for Farul Constanţa, Știința Baia Mare and Timișoara Saracens.

== International career ==
He has currently 61 caps for Georgia, since his first game at the 14–19 loss to Portugal, on 14 February 2004, in Tbilisi, for the Six Nations B. He has scored 6 tries for the "Lelos", with an aggregate of 30 points. Samkharadze was called for the 2007 Rugby World Cup, playing in four games, and for the 2011 Rugby World Cup, playing in two games. He remained scoreless on both occasions.
