= Vali-Cătălin Mureșan =

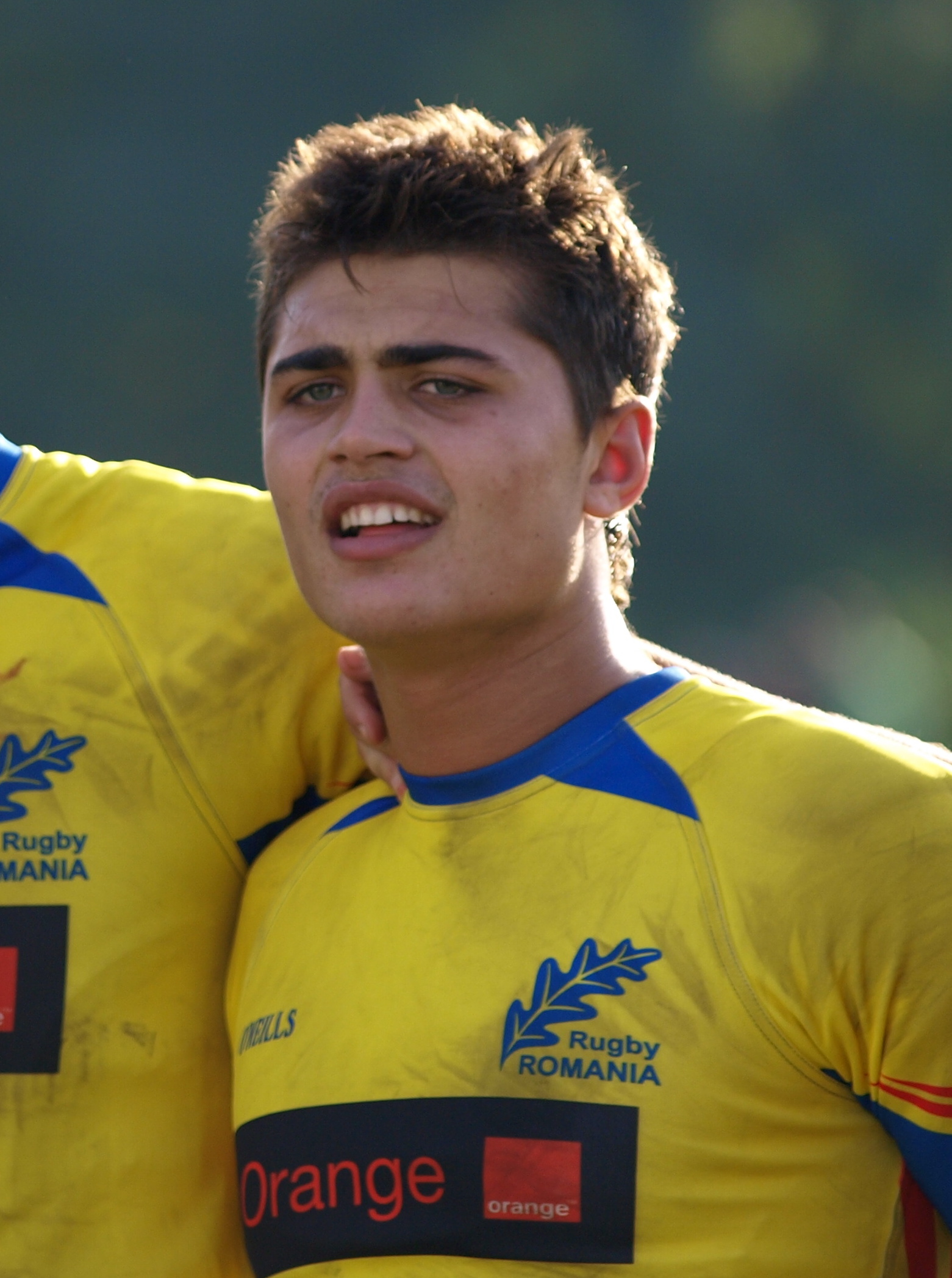
- Vali-Cătălin Mureșan in 2008 with Romania U-19 National Rugby Union Team
- Full name: Vali-Cătălin Mureșan
- Born: 3 June 1990 (age 36) Brăila, Romania
- Height: 1.90 m (6 ft 3 in)
- Weight: 108 kg (17 st 0 lb; 238 lb)

Rugby union career
- Position: Flanker
Senior career
Years	Team	Apps	(Points)
?–2015	Farul Constanța	19	(10)
2015–18	Steaua București	9	(10)
- Correct as of 1 October 2018
Provincial / State sides
Years	Team	Apps	(Points)
2014–15	București Wolves	4	(5)
- Correct as of 13 October 2017

Vali-Cătălin Mureșan (née Mototolea; born 3 June 1990) is a Romanian rugby union football player. He plays as a flanker.

== Career ==
Before joining Steaua, Vali-Cătălin Mureșan played for SuperLiga counterparts Farul Constanța from where he moved to Steaua in 2015.
