= Dumani Mtya =

Romania international rugby union player

- Full name: Dumani Siphosethu Mtya
- Born: 14 March 1985 (age 41) East London, South Africa
- Height: 1.94 m (6 ft 4 1/2 in)
- Weight: 114 kg (17 st 13 lb; 251 lb)

Rugby union career
- Position(s): Lock, second row
- Current team: Știința Baia Mare
Senior career
Years	Team	Apps	(Points)
- University of Cape Town
- Schotschekloof / SK Walmers RFC
- Bruff
- Romangna
- Farul Constanța
2014	CSM București	8	(0)
2015–present	Știința Baia Mare	48	(15)
- Correct as of 14 March 2020
Provincial / State sides
Years	Team	Apps	(Points)
2006–08	Western Province		
- Correct as of 14 March 2020
International career
Years	Team	Apps	(Points)
2018–present	Romania	1	(0)
- Correct as of 14 March 2020

Dumani Siphosethu Mtya (born 14 March 1985) is a South African born Romanian rugby union player. He plays as a lock for professional SuperLiga club Știința Baia Mare.

== Club career ==
Before joining Știința Baia Mare, Dumani Mtya played rugby for University of Cape Town and Walmers RFC, both in South Africa, for Bruff in Ireland and Romangna in Italy. In Romania he played for Farul Constanța and CSM București.

== International career ==
Mtya is also selected for Romania's national team, the Oaks, making his international debut during Week 5 of 2018 Rugby Europe Championship against the Lelos on 18 March 2018.
