= Paulică Ion =

Romania international rugby union player

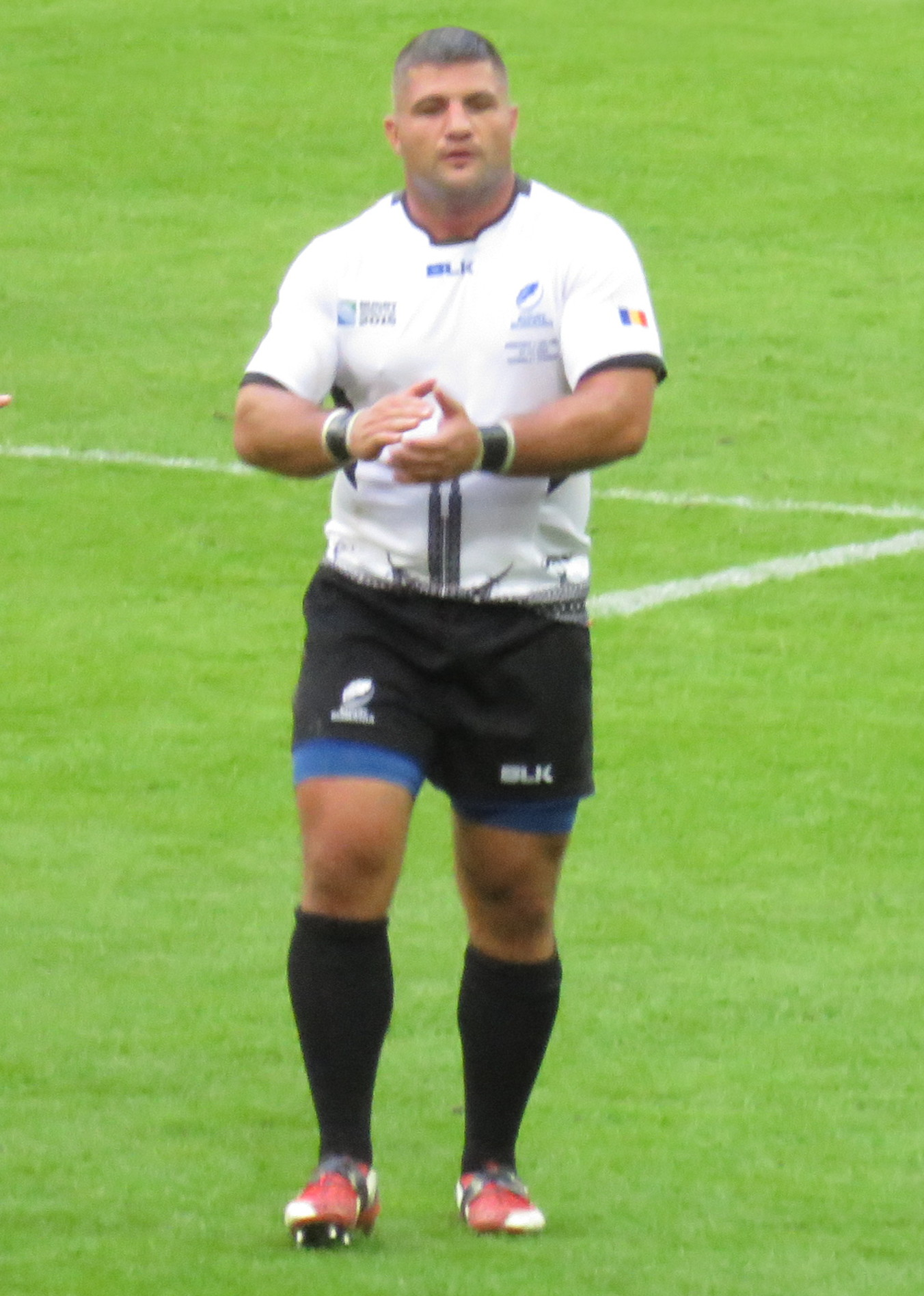
- Born: Paulică Ion; 10 January 1983 (age 43) Brăila, Romania
- Height: 1.83 m (6 ft 0 in)
- Weight: 119 kg (18 st 10 lb)

Rugby union career
- Position: Prop
Youth career
- Tracon Brăila
Senior career
Years	Team	Apps	(Points)
2003–04	Universitatea Cluj		
2004–07	Steaua București		
2007–09	Bath	24	(0)
2009–12	London Irish	64	(5)
2012–13	London Welsh	20	(0)
2013–16	Perpignan	68	(0)
- Correct as of 30 December 2019 @15:38:44 PM (AEST)
Provincial / State sides
Years	Team	Apps	(Points)
2004–07	București Wolves	13	(0)
- Correct as of 20 April 2020
International career
Years	Team	Apps	(Points)
2003–15	Romania	74	(5)
- Correct as of 11 October 2015

Paulică Ion (born 10 January 1983 in Brăila) is a Romanian rugby union footballer. A tighthead prop, he started his career with CSA Steaua București, before moving to Bath in 2007 and previously played for London Irish. He was loaned to London Welsh for the 2012/13 Season. On 20 April 2013, it was announced Paulica Ion would join the French Top 14 side USA Perpignan for the 2013/14 season.

== Provincial / State sides ==
Ion was also selected between 2005 and 2015 for the State side assembled to play in the European Cups, namely București Wolves.

== International career ==
As of 11 October 2015, he has played 74 games for the Romanian national team, scoring one try. He played one match at the 2003 Rugby World Cup finals, two at the 2007 Rugby World Cup finals, four at the 2011 Rugby World Cup finals and also four at the 2015 Rugby World Cup finals.
