= Davit Kubriashvili =

Georgia international rugby union player

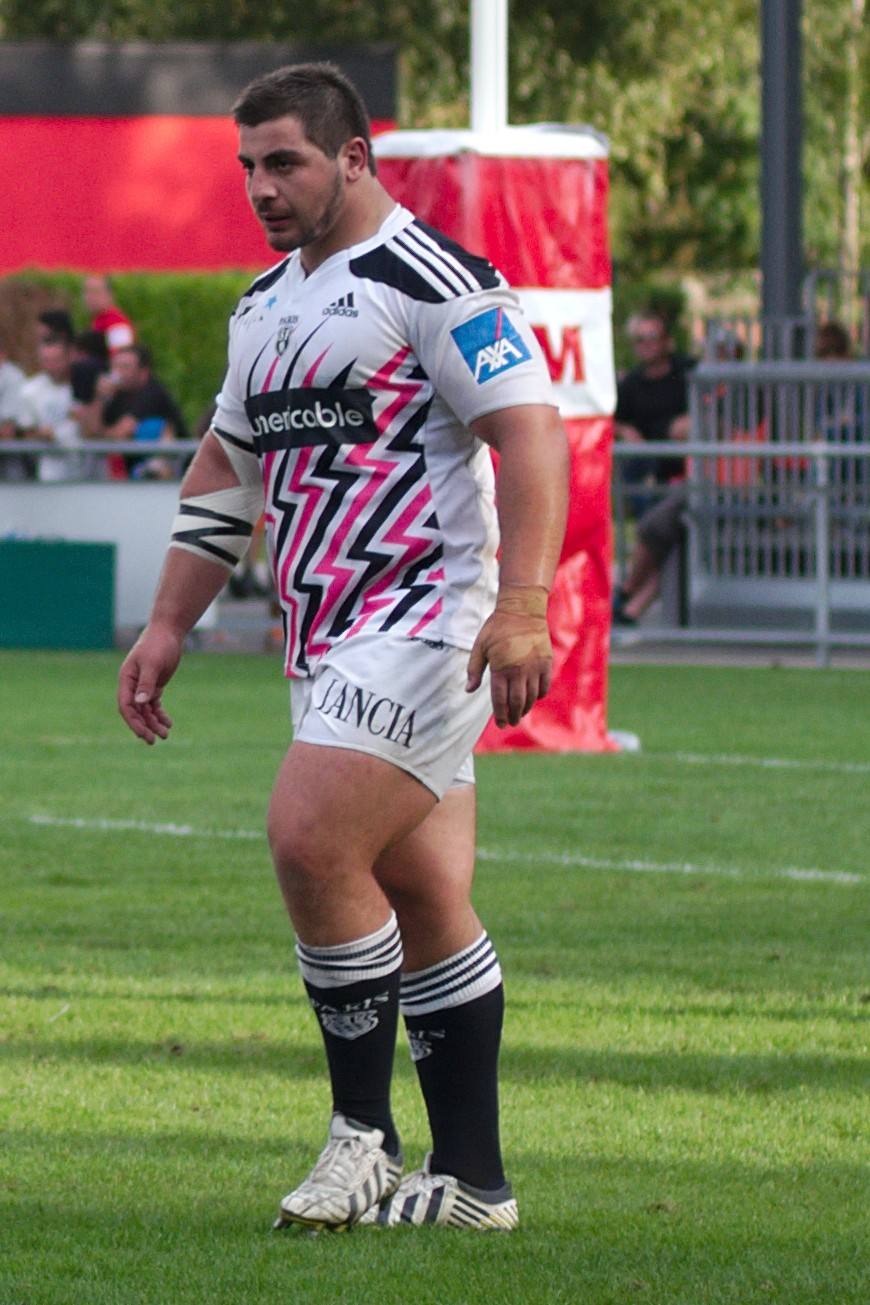
- Born: 3 December 1986 (age 39) Tbilisi, Georgian SSR, Soviet Union
- Height: 1.85 m (6 ft 1 in)
- Weight: 123 kg (19 st 5 lb; 271 lb)

Rugby union career
- Position: Tighthead Prop
Amateur team(s)
Years	Team	Apps	(Points)
- Massy
Senior career
Years	Team	Apps	(Points)
2007–2008	Montpellier	2	(0)
2008–2013	Toulon	128	(10)
2013–2015	Stade Français	43	(0)
2015-2018	Montpellier	45	(5)
2018–2020	Grenoble	36	(0)
2020–2022	Perpignan	34	(10)
2022–2023	Clermont Auvergne		
- Correct as of 16 June 2023
International career
Years	Team	Apps	(Points)
2007–2022	Georgia	47	(10)
2011	Barbarian F.C.	3	(0)
- Correct as of 16 June 2023

Davit Kubriashvili (Georgian: დავით ქუბრიაშვილი; born 12 March 1986) is a former Georgian rugby union player. His position is prop. He played for Georgia in the 2011 Rugby World Cup.

== Domestic career ==
After arriving in France from Georgia in Fédérale 1 to play for Massy, Kubriashvili, aged 21, moved up the leagues to the Top 14 with Montpellier. However, after one season there where he didn't get much game time, he moved to the newly promoted Toulon in 2008, where he has since established himself as a regular member of their squad and has played over 100 matches for the club.

After arriving before the 2008/09 season, Kubriashvili soon worked his way to becoming first choice in 2009 and remained first choice for the following season. In 2010, Toulon signed former All Black Carl Hayman who was seen as one of the best tighthead props in world rugby. However, Kubriashvili again kept his place as first choice for the 2010/11 season, keeping Hayman on the bench. Kubriashvili was considered one of the best tighthead props in the league that season.

After playing at the 2011 World Cup, Kubriashvili lost a bit of form. Hayman became first choice again, and Kubriashvili has been the second choice since. In May 2013 he played as a replacement as Toulon won the 2013 Heineken Cup Final by 16–15 against Clermont Auvergne. In the summer of 2013, he joined the Top 14 side Stade Français.

== International career ==
Kubriashvili made his debut for Georgia in 2008 against Portugal, but has largely had to play as second choice to Davit Zirakashvili through most of his international career. In 2011 after a successful season for Toulon, Kubriashvili became the first Georgian to play for the Barbarians and he featured in their victories over England and Wales.

== Honours ==
- 2012–13 Heineken Cup: winner (Toulon)
- 2015–16 European Rugby Challenge Cup: winner (Montpellier).
