= Daniel Carpo =

Romanian rugby union footballer (born 1984)

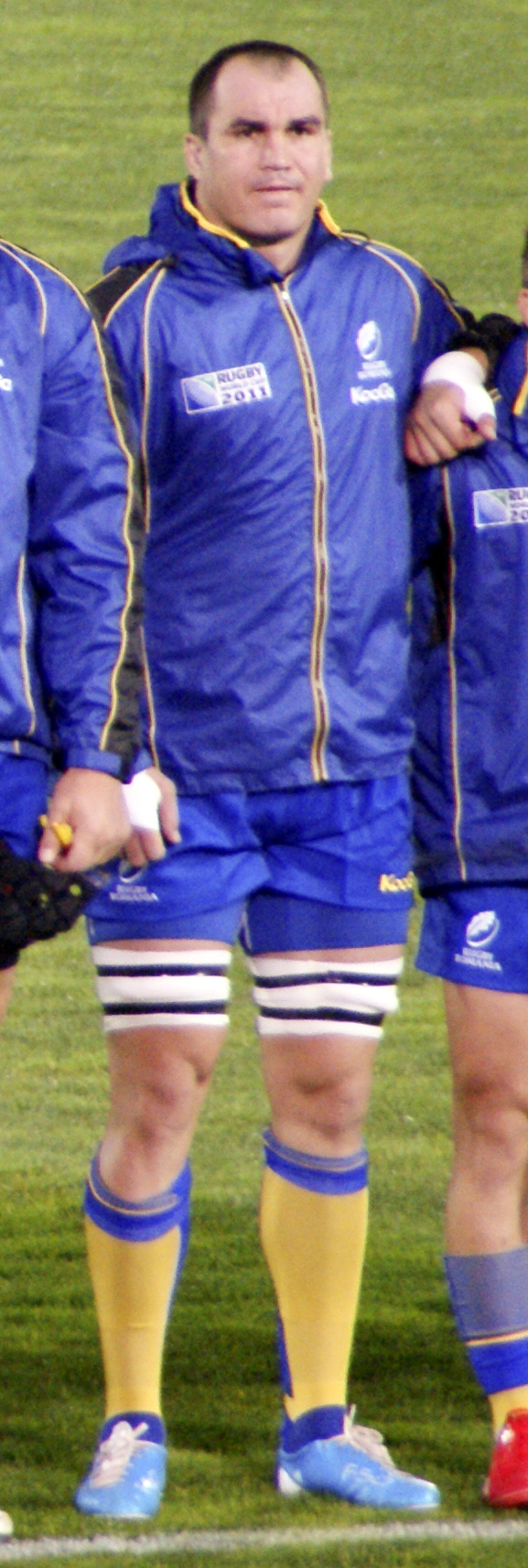
- Carpo during a 2011 Rugby World Cup match
- Born: 26 November 1984 (age 41) Tulcea, Romania
- Height: 1.91 m (6 ft 3 in)
- Weight: 106 kg (234 lb)

Rugby union career
- Position: Number 8
Senior career
Years	Team	Apps	(Points)
2005–13	RCJ Farul Constanța		
2005–13	București Wolves		
2013–15	Timișoara Saracens		
2015–16	CSM București		
2016–17	Richmond F.C.		
2017–18	CSM București		
2018–Present	Dinamo București		
- Correct as of 29 May 2019
International career
Years	Team	Apps	(Points)
2007–2015	Romania	54	(45)
National sevens team
Years	Team		Comps
2018–	Romania 7`s		3
Coaching career
- Years: Team
- 2018–: Romania 7`s (Assistant Coach/Manager)

Daniel Carpo (born 26 November 1984 in Tulcea) is a Romanian rugby union footballer. He plays as number eight.

== Club career ==
Carpo played for RCJ Farul Constanța, from 2002/03 to 2010/11. Currently he is playing for Dinamo București, in the Romanian Rugby Championship. He was MVP for two years in a row, in 2010 and 2011.

== International career ==
Carpo has 54 caps for Romania, since 2007, with 9 tries scored, 45 points on aggregate. He had his first game at the 19-8 win over Italy A, at 10 June 2007, in Bucharest, for the IRB Nations Cup. He was called for the 2011 Rugby World Cup, playing in three games and scoring a try in the 34-24 loss to Scotland, and for the 2015 Rugby World Cup, where he played once again in three games but without scoring.
