= Constantin Gheară =

Romanian rugby union player (born 1981)

Constantin Gheară (born Constanța, 2 September 1981) is a Romanian rugby union player. He plays as a wing.

Gheară plays for Farul Constanța, in the Romanian Rugby Championship.

He has 18 caps for Romania, from 2004 to 2012, with 1 try scored, 5 points on aggregate. He was called for the 2011 Rugby World Cup, playing in two games, one as a substitute, but without scoring. He has been absent from the National Team since 2012.
