= Tedo Zibzibadze =

Georgia international rugby union player

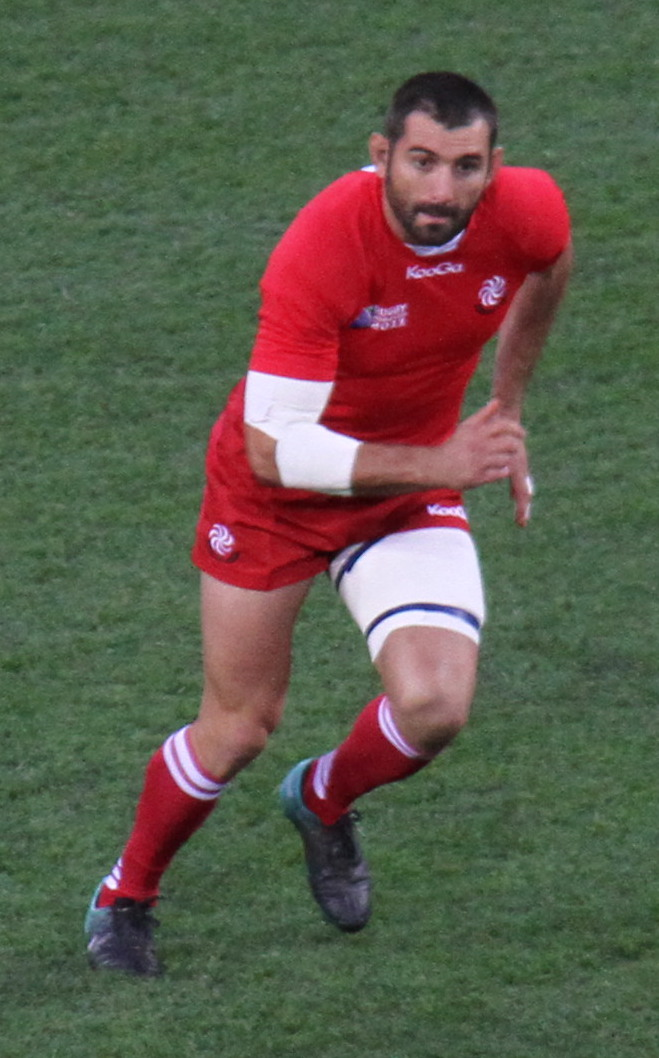
- Zibzibadze at the 2011 Rugby World Cup in Georgia's match against England
- Born: August 6, 1980 (age 46)
- Height: 5 ft 11 in (1.80 m)
- Weight: 200 lb (91 kg)

Rugby union career
- Position: Centre
Senior career
Years	Team	Apps	(Points)
2001-2002	Club Olympique Tuchan		
2002-2003	US Tours		
2003-2006	Gourdon XV		
2006-2007	CA Périgueux		
International career
Years	Team	Apps	(Points)
2000-2014	Georgia	77	(115)

Tevodore "Tedo" Zibzibadze (born 6 August 1980 in Kutaisi) is a Georgian rugby union player who plays as a centre.

He played in France for Club Olympique Tuchan (2001/02), US Tours (2002/03) and Gourdon XV (2003/04-2005/06). He plays for CA Périgueux, since 2006/07.

He has 77 caps for Georgia, with 23 tries scored, 115 points on aggregate. He had his first game at 26 January 2000, in a 51-7 loss to Italy XV, in Livorno, in a tour. He was only 19 years old. He was called for the 2003 Rugby World Cup, playing in three games but without scoring. He wasn't called for the 2007 Rugby World Cup but would return for the 2011 Rugby World Cup, where he played four games, once again without scoring. He was a regular player at the Georgia side that reached the qualification for the 2015 Rugby World Cup, but wasn't called for the final squad.
