= Vakhtang Maisuradze =

- Born: Vakhtang Maisuradze; 11 March 1987 (age 39) Tskhinvali, Georgian SSR
- Height: 1.94 m (6 ft 4 in)
- Weight: 113 kg (17 st 11 lb)

Rugby union career
- Position: Lock
Senior career
Years	Team	Apps	(Points)
2008–2009	Pogoń Siedlce		(0)
2009-2010	Chambéry	15	(5)
2010-2011	Saint Nazaire	17	(0)
2011-2012	La Seyne	8	(5)
2012-2016	Albi	39	
2016-	RC Vannes		
- Correct as of 31 January 2015
International career
Years	Team	Apps	(Points)
2011-	Georgia	25	(15)
- Correct as of 12 June 2016

Vakhtang Maisuradze (Georgian: ვახტანგ მაისურაძე; born 11 March 1987 in Tskhinvali) is a Georgian rugby union player who plays as a lock.

He played for Polish club Pogoń Siedlce (2008–2009) before moving to France, where he played for Saint-Nazaire and Albi, among others.

He has 20 caps for Georgia, with 3 tries scored, 15 points on aggregate. He had his first game on 5 February 2011, in a 62–3 win over Ukraine, in Tbilisi, for the Six Nations B. He was called for the 2011 Rugby World Cup, where he played in all the four games without scoring.
