= Dimitri Basilaia =

Georgian rugby union player

- Born: Dimitri Basilaia; 27 November 1985 (age 40) Tbilisi, Georgian SSR, Soviet Union
- Height: 1.90 m (6 ft 3 in)
- Weight: 110 kg (17 st 5 lb; 243 lb)

Rugby union career
- Position(s): Number 8, Flanker
- Current team: Perpignan
Senior career
Years	Team	Apps	(Points)
- Poti
-2008	Clermont	0	(0)
2008–09	Morlaàs	3	(0)
2009–10	Le Bugue	14	(0)
2010–11	Aubenas	17	(10)
2011–12	Valence d'Agen	16	(10)
2012–14	Edinburgh	18	(0)
2014-	Perpignan	0	(0)
- Correct as of 3 Jul 2014
International career
Years	Team	Apps	(Points)
2008–	Georgia	33	(25)

Dimitri Basilaia (born November 27, 1985) is a Georgian rugby union player who plays for USA Perpignan in the Top 14.

== Club career ==
Basilaia left Georgia and joined Clermont, playing for Espoirs. After failing to break into the Clermont first team, he left for Fédérale 1 side Morlaàs in 2008. Basilaia went on to play for four clubs in Fédérale 1 in four seasons, with one season each at Le Bugue, Aubenas and Valence d'Agen. Following his appearances for Georgia at the 2011 World Cup, he was signed by Edinburgh in 2012 and became the first Georgian to play in the Pro12. He joined Perpignan in May 2014.

== International career ==
Basilaia made his debut for Georgia in 2008, scoring a try against Portugal and becoming first choice for the ENC that year. However, after 2008, Basilaia lost his place in the Georgia side as Mamuka Gorgodze changed position from lock to number 8. Basilaia made limited appearances for Georgia, either as a sub or in weakened sides over the next few years.

After not playing for 19 months, Basilaia returned to the Georgian side before the 2011 World Cup in the IRB Nations Cup in June, and made the Georgian World Cup squad. During the tournament Basilaia started three matches and scored a try against England.
