= Alfredo Lalanne =

Argentine rugby union player (born 1983)

- Born: Alfredo Lalanne; March 3, 1983 (age 43) Buenos Aires, Argentina
- Height: 1.72 m (5 ft 8 in)
- Weight: 79 kg (12 st 6 lb)
- School: Los Molinos
- University: St Andrew's University

Rugby union career
- Position: Scrum-half
Senior career
Years	Team	Apps	(Points)
–2008	San Isidro		
2008–2011	London Irish	23	(8)
2011–2012	London Scottish	8	(5)
International career
Years	Team	Apps	(Points)
2008–2011	Argentina	10	(0)
National sevens team
Years	Team		Comps
- Argentina 7s

Alfredo Lalanne (born 3 March 1983 in Buenos Aires) is an Argentine scrum-half who plays for London Scottish in the Aviva Championship.

Lalanne was born in Buenos Aires, where he attended the Los Molinos School. The San Isidro Club was his rugby 'home' through his teens and early twenties. He played at all age levels for Argentina and made lasting friendships with Tomás de Vedia, Gonzalo Tiesi and Juan Manuel Leguizamón, players who preceded him at London Irish.

Lalanne played for his country's age group teams before joining the Argentina Sevens team in the IRB World Sevens Series circuit in 2007. He was also his country's number one choice as scrum-half in the IRB Nations Cup in Bucharest in 2007, where the Argentina Jaguars made it to the final only to lose to the Emerging Springboks.

He made his debut for Argentina against South Africa on 9 August 2008 in Johannesburg.

He was called for the 2011 Rugby World Cup.
