= Ionel Cazan =

Romanian rugby union player

Ionel Cazan (born 25 November 1988 in Bucharest) is a Romanian rugby union player. He plays as a centre.

Cazan played for Steaua București and currently plays for Farul Constanța, in the Romanian Rugby Championship.

He has 15 caps for Romania, since his first game in 2010, with 2 tries scored, 10 points on aggregate. He was called for the 2011 Rugby World Cup, playing in three games, one as a substitute, and scoring a try. He hasn't been called again since 2013.
