= Ștefan Ciuntu =

Romanian rugby union player (born 1986)

Ștefan Ciuntu (born 10 April 1986) is a Romanian rugby union player. He plays as a wing.

He has played for Dinamo București (2006/07-2007/08), and plays for Baia Mare, since 2008/09. He won 3 titles of the Romanian Rugby Championship, in 2008/09, 2009/10 and 2010/11. He also plays at București Wolves.

He has 34 caps for Romania, since 2007, with 10 tries scored, 50 points on aggregate. He was called for the 2007 Rugby World Cup, playing a single game, without scoring, and for the 2011 Rugby World Cup, playing in three games and remaining scoreless once again. He has been absent from his National Team since then.
