= Bogdan Zebega =

Romanian retired rugby player

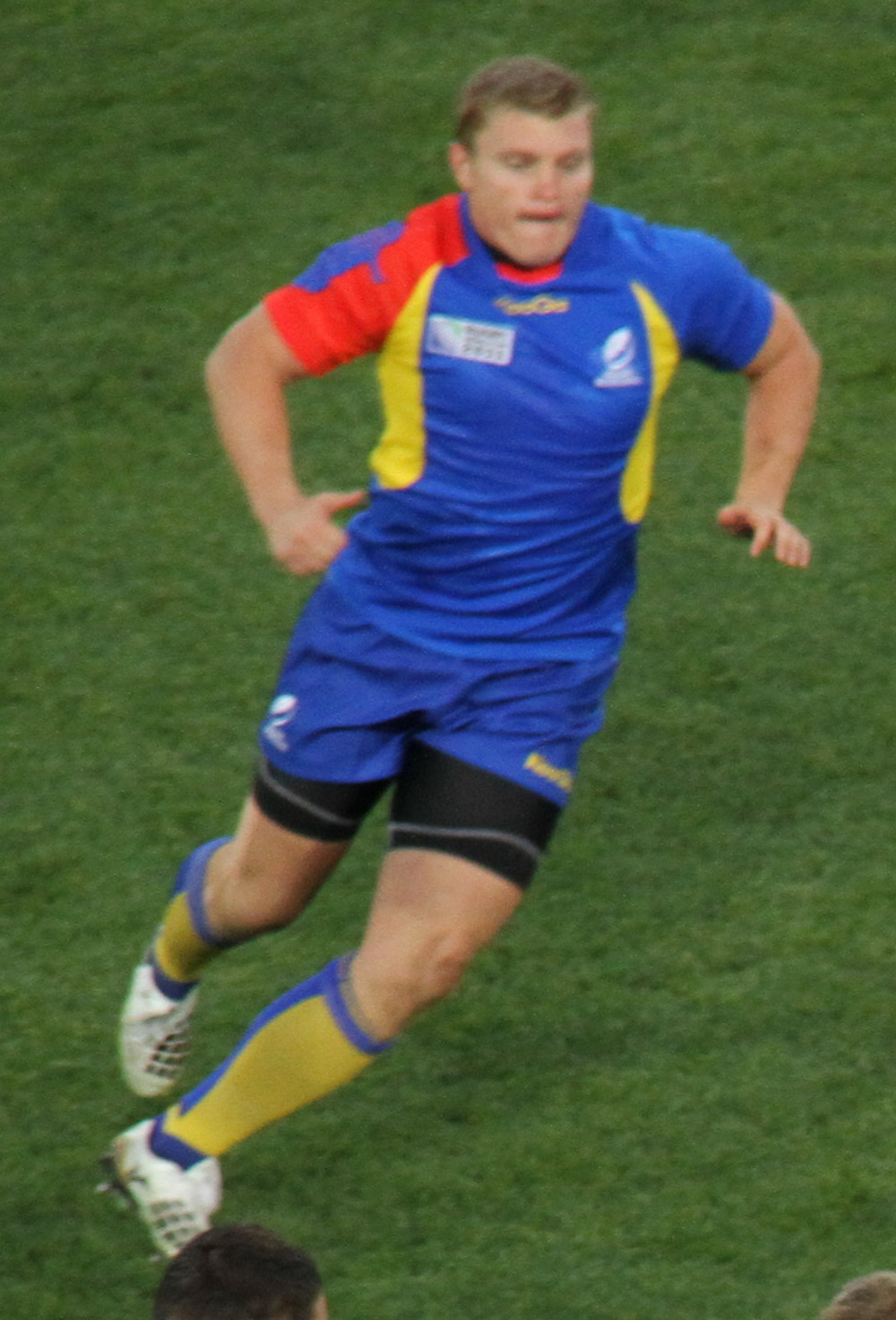
- Zebega during the 2011 Rugby World Cup
- Full name: Bogdan Zebega
- Born: 21 February 1984 (age 42) Bârlad, Romania
- Height: 1.84 m (6 ft 1/2 in)
- Weight: 107 kg (16 st 12 lb; 236 lb)

Rugby union career
- Position: Hooker
- Current team: Retired
Senior career
Years	Team	Apps	(Points)
2003–12	Steaua București		
Provincial / State sides
Years	Team	Apps	(Points)
2004–09	București Wolves	4	(0)
- Correct as of 17 October 2017
International career
Years	Team	Apps	(Points)
2004–11	Romania	35	(15)

Bogdan Zebega (born 21 February 1984 in Bârlad) is a retired Romanian rugby union player.

== Club career ==
Zebega only played for CSA Steaua București in the Romanian Rugby Championship.

== International career ==
He had 35 caps for Romania, from 2004 to 2011, scoring 3 tries, 15 points on aggregate. He was called for the 2011 Rugby World Cup, playing in two games, one as a substitute, but without scoring. He has been absent from the National Team since then.
