= Nicolae Nere =

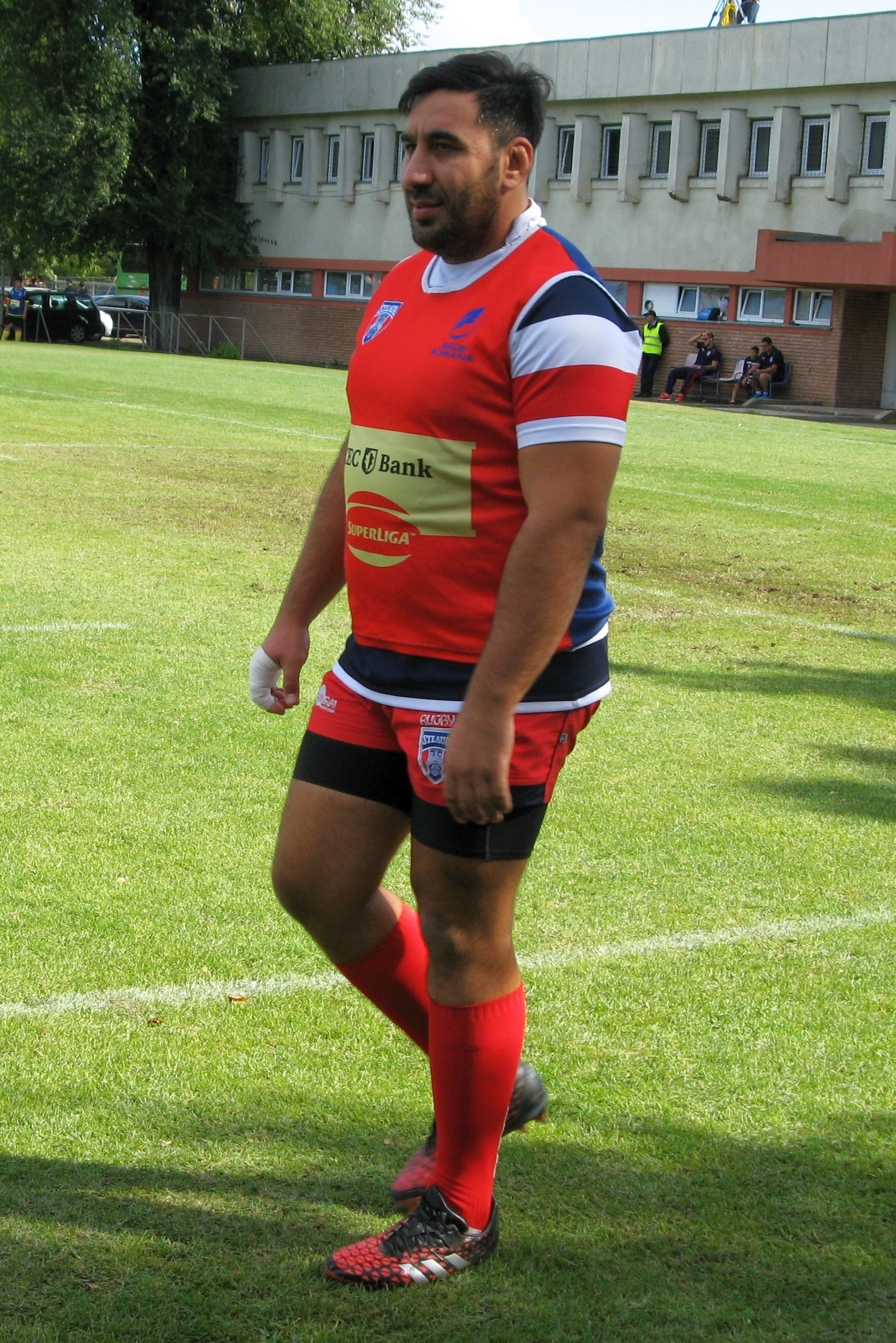
- Nicolae Nere training with Steaua in 2017
- Born: 6 December 1981 (age 44) Bucharest, Romania
- Height: 1.85 m (6 ft 1 in)
- Weight: 102 kg (16 st 1 lb)

Rugby union career
- Position: Prop
Senior career
Years	Team	Apps	(Points)
2005–2013	Steaua București		
2005–2012	Bucharest Wolves		
2013–2014	Farul Constanța		
2014–2015	CSM București		
2015–	Steaua București		
- Correct as of 28 March 2017
International career
Years	Team	Apps	(Points)
2006–2011	Romania	18	(5)
- Correct as of 28 March 2017

Nicolae Nere (born 6 December 1981 in Bucharest) is a Romanian rugby union player. He plays as a prop.

As of March 28, 2016, he plays for Steaua București in the SuperLiga.

He previously played for Farul Constanța, CSM București, and Bucharest Wolves in the Amlin Challenge Cup.

He gathered 18 caps for Romania, from 2006 to 2011, scoring 1 try, 5 points on aggregate. He was called for the 2011 Rugby World Cup, playing in a single game without scoring. He has been absent from the National Team since then.
