= Adrian Apostol =

Romanian rugby union player

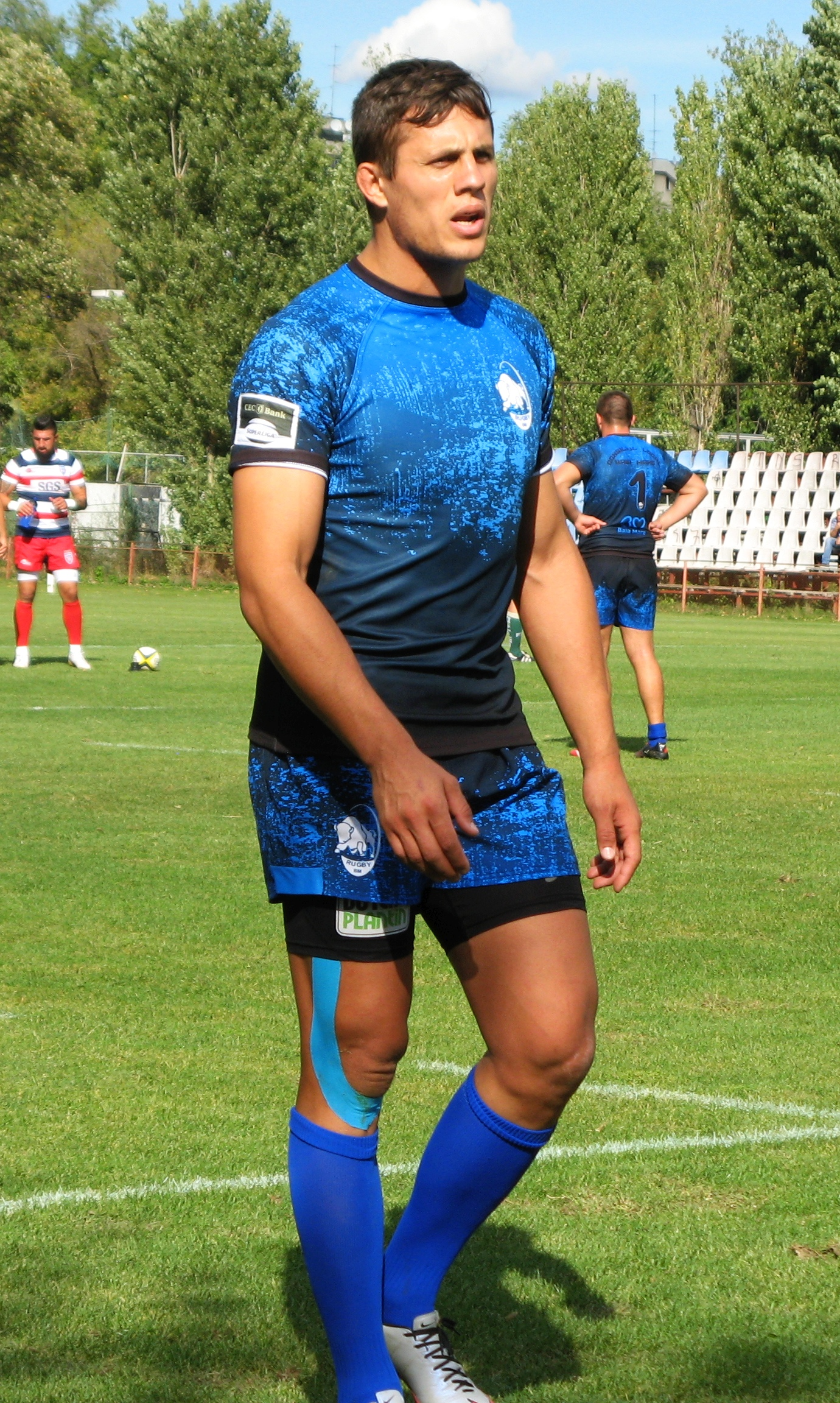
- Adrian Apostol playing for CSM Baia Mare in 2017
- Born: Adrian Marian Apostol; 11 March 1990 (age 36) Constanța, Romania
- Height: 1.86 m (6 ft 1 in)
- Weight: 92 kg (203 lb; 14.5 st)

Rugby union career
- Position: Wing
Senior career
Years	Team	Apps	(Points)
2014–15	București Wolves	4	(0)
- Correct as of 27 August 2015
Provincial / State sides
Years	Team	Apps	(Points)
2010–12	Steaua București	13	(20)
2012–13	Farul Constanța	16	(5)
2013–	Baia Mare	28	(40)
- Correct as of 5 December 2015
International career
Years	Team	Apps	(Points)
2011–	Romania	23	(30)
- Correct as of 13 February 2016

Adrian Marian Apostol (born 11 March 1990) is a Romanian rugby union player. He plays as a wing.

== Club career ==
He has played for CSA Steaua București, from 2010/11 to 2011/12, Farul Constanța, from 2011/12 to 2013/14, and plays for Baia Mare, since 2014/15. He also played for București Wolves, a team selected from the Romanian Championship, at international level.

== International career ==
He has 22 caps for Romania, since his first game in 2011, with 6 tries scored, 30 points on aggregate. He was called as replacement player for the 2011 Rugby World Cup, where he played a single game. He was called once again for the 2015 Rugby World Cup, where he played in all the four games, one of them as a substitute, scoring 2 tries, 10 points on aggregate.
