= Petru Tamba =

- Born: 19 December 1990 (age 35)
- Height: 1.76 m (5 ft 9 1/2 in)
- Weight: 115 kg (254 lb)

Rugby union career
- Position: Prop
Senior career
Years	Team	Apps	(Points)
2010–15	București Wolves	10	(0)
2012	Cardiff Blues	1	(0)
- Correct as of 25 January 2015
Provincial / State sides
Years	Team	Apps	(Points)
2011	Steaua București	6	(0)
2012–13	Farul Constanța	1	(0)
2014	Baia Mare	14	(5)
2015	Olimpia București	8	(0)
2015–	L'Aquila	3	(0)
- Correct as of 6 February 2015
International career
Years	Team	Apps	(Points)
2012–	Romania	3	(0)
- Correct as of 15 January 2016

Petru Tamba (born 19 December 1990) is a Romanian rugby union player. He plays in the prop position for amateur Super 10 club L'Aquila and formally for București based European Challenge Cup side the Wolves. He also plays for Romania's national team the Oaks.
