= Levan Datunashvili =

Georgia international rugby union player (born 1983)

- Born: 18 January 1983 (age 43) Tbilisi, Georgian SSR, Soviet Union
- Height: 1.96 m (6 ft 5 in)
- Weight: 114 kg (17 st 13 lb; 251 lb)

Rugby union career
- Position: Lock
Senior career
Years	Team	Apps	(Points)
-2006	Vierzon		
2006-2008	Montluçon	15	(5)
2008-2010	Aurillac	23	(10)
2010-2011	Figeac	18	(5)
2011-2016	Aurillac	125	(40)
2018-2019	Jiki Gori		
- Correct as of 18 April 2016
International career
Years	Team	Apps	(Points)
2004-2015	Georgia	75	(30)
- Correct as of 7 October 2015

Levan Datunahsvili (Georgian: ლევან დათუნაშვილი; born 18 January 1983, in Tbilisi) is a Georgian rugby union player who plays as a lock.

== Career ==
Datunahsvili currently plays for Aurillac, in France.

He has currently 75 caps, with 8 tries scored, 40 points in aggregate, for the Georgian Squad. His debut was on 22 February 2004, in a 6–6 draw with Spain, where he played as a substitute. He was selected for the Georgia side that entered the 2007 Rugby World Cup finals. He played three matches, two of them as a substitute. He was called for the 2011 Rugby World Cup, playing in four matches. He was scoreless in both presences.
