= Silviu Vasiliu =

- Born: 23 June 1986 (age 40)
- Height: 1.84 m (6 ft 1/2 in)
- Weight: 110 kg (240 lb)

Rugby union career
- Position: Prop
Senior career
Years	Team	Apps	(Points)
2014–15	București Wolves	6	(0)
- Correct as of 24 January 2015
Provincial / State sides
Years	Team	Apps	(Points)
2010, 2015–	Steaua București	1	(5)
2013	Saint-Jean-d'Angély	17	(0)
2013–14	Universitatea Cluj	5	(5)
2015–	Olimpia București	5	(5)
- Correct as of 5 December 2015
International career
Years	Team	Apps	(Points)
2016–	Romania	2	(0)
- Correct as of 13 February 2016

Silviu Vasiliu (born 23 June 1986) is a Romanian rugby union player. He plays in the prop position for amateur SuperLiga club Steaua București and București based European Challenge Cup side the Wolves. He also plays for Romania's national team the Oaks.
