= Daniel Ianuș =

Romanian rugby union player (born 1987)

Daniel Gabriel Ianuș (born 11 April 1987 in Iasi) is a Romanian rugby union player. He plays as a flanker.

Ianuș plays for Timișoara Saracens in the Romanian Rugby Championship. He also plays for Bucuresti Wolves at international level.

He has 13 caps for Romania, since his debut, at the 19-10 win over Spain, at 7 February 2009, in Madrid, for the 2011 Rugby World Cup qualifyings. He was called for the 2011 Rugby World Cup, playing in three games but without scoring. He missed the 2015 Rugby World Cup. He has currently 3 tries scored, with 15 points on aggregate.
