= Csaba Gál =

Romanian rugby union player

- Full name: Minya Csaba Gál
- Born: 7 March 1985 (age 41)
- Height: 6 ft 0 in (1.83 m)
- Weight: 199 lb (90 kg; 14.2 st)

Rugby union career
- Position: Centre
Senior career
Years	Team	Apps	(Points)
2005–2013	Dinamo București	36	(10)
2013–15	Baia Mare	18	(25)
2013–2015	București Wolves	10	(0)
2015–2018	Cluj	7	(5)
International career
Years	Team	Apps	(Points)
2005–2016	Romania	88	(22)

Minya Csaba Gál (born Cluj-Napoca, 7 March 1985) is a Romanian rugby union footballer. He plays a centre.

Gál first played at U Cluj, moving to Dinamo Bucharest, in 2004. He currently plays for CSM Baia Mare. He also plays internationally for București Oaks in the European Challenge Cup.

He was selected for the Romania squad that played at the 2007 Rugby World Cup. The Romanian centre played in three matches during the competition. He also competed at the 2011 Rugby World Cup. In 2015 he returned to his training club, "U" Cluj, and became the captain.

Gál has currently 88 caps for Romania, with 3 tries and 1 conversion scored, 17 points on aggregate. He scored his first try in the decisive 2011 Rugby World Cup Final Place Play-off against Uruguay, on 27 November 2010 (won 39–12).

Since June 2021, Gal is the current president of U Cluj Rugby, which plays in the Romanian SuperLiga.
