= Genaro Fessia =

Argentine rugby union footballer

- Born: Genaro Fessia; 22 July 1981 (age 45) Córdoba, Argentina
- Height: 1.88 m (6 ft 2 in)
- Weight: 105 kg (231 lb)

Rugby union career
- Position: Blindside / No.8
Senior career
Years	Team	Apps	(Points)
2007–08	Sale Sharks	1	(0)
2008–09	Cordoba Athletic		
2009–11	Pampas XV	23	(10)
2011–12	London Wasps	0	(0)
2012–	Cordoba Athletic		(0)
- Correct as of 25 September 2012
International career
Years	Team	Apps	(Points)
2007–	Argentina	13	(10)
- Correct as of 25 September 2012

Genaro Fessia (born 22 July 1981 in Córdoba) is an Argentine rugby union. He played flank. Fessia's debut match for his country was in 2005 when he played against Canada. He was also selected to represent Argentina for the incoming June 2010 tours against France and Scotland, including competing in the 2011 Rugby World Cup in New Zealand. Fessia played most of his rugby for Cordoba Athletic Club, but in 2007 he spent a year playing with Sale Sharks followed by a year with the London Wasps.

After retiring as a player, Genaro transitioned to coaching, initially contributing to his local club as a coach and later as Rugby Director, also working with the Argentine Rugby Union academy in Córdoba. In pursuit of new opportunities, he relocated to the United States and served as an assistant rugby coach at Belmont Abbey College. He became head coach in 2024.

Fessia earned a bachelor's degree in Sports Managing from Universidad Siglo XXI and completed the English Advanced Course at the University of Languages, National University of Cordoba.
