= RCJ Farul Constanța =

Romanian rugby union club, based in Constanța

(Romania) Farul Constanţa
- Full name: Rugby Club Județean Farul Constanţa
- Nickname: Marinarii (Sailors)
- Founded: 1955; 71 years ago
- Disbanded: 2014; 12 years ago
- Location: Constanţa, Romania
- Ground: Stadionul Mihai Naca (Capacity: 1,000)
- League: CEC Bank SuperLiga
- 2014 Divizia Naţională: Runners up
Team kit

Rugby Club Județean Farul Constanța (lit. 'County Rugby Club Lighthouse Constanța') was a semi-professional Romanian rugby union club from Constanța, which played continuously from 1970 until 2014 in the CEC Bank SuperLiga, the first division of Romanian rugby. The team withdrew from the Romanian top-tier competition before the 2015 edition and ultimately disbanded. The team was named for the city's famous Genoese Lighthouse.

Farul Constanța was recognized by many Romanian fans as one of the best Romanian clubs outside Bucureşti as not only did they achieve consistent results by finishing within the top 4 in the SuperLiga almost every year, they were also the first and only Romanian team to play in the then known Heineken Cup (known as the European Rugby Champions Cup now), during its inaugural season in 1995–96, notably playing in the first ever match of the Heineken Cup against Stade Toulousain in Constanța.

== Honours ==
- SuperLiga CEC Bank:
  - Winners (6): 1974–75, 1975–76, 1977–78, 1985–86, 1994–95, 1996–97
  - Runners-up (1): 2014
- Cupa României:
  - Winners (1): 1992
  - Runners-up (2): 2001, 2009

== Notable former players ==
- (Fiji) Malakai Ravulo
- (Fiji) Nemia Kenatale
- (Fiji) Jonetani Ralulu
- (Samoa) Daniel Crichton
- (Romania) Vlad Badalicescu
- (Romania) Nicolae Nere
- (Romania) Petru Tamba
- (Romania) Otar Turashvili
- (Romania) Cristian Petre
- (Romania) Constantin Gheară
- (Romania) Ionel Cazan
- (Romania) Florin Vlaicu
- (Romania) Adrian Apostol
- (Romania) Alexandru Zaharia
- (Namibia) Eugene Jantjies
- (Namibia) Renaud van Neel
