= 2011 Rugby World Cup =

7th Rugby World Cup

Tournament details
- Host nation: New Zealand
- Venue: 12 (in 11 host cities)
- Dates: 9 September – 23 October
- No. of nations: 20 (91 qualifying)

Final positions
- Champions: New Zealand (2nd title)
- Runner-up: France
- Third place: Australia

Tournament statistics
- Matches played: 48
- Attendance: 1,477,294 (30,777 per match)
- Top scorer(s): (South Africa) Morné Steyn (62)
- Most tries: (England) Chris Ashton; (France) Vincent Clerc; (6 tries each)

The 2011 Rugby World Cup, was the seventh Rugby World Cup, a quadrennial international rugby union competition inaugurated in 1987. The International Rugby Board (IRB) selected New Zealand as the host country in preference to Japan and South Africa at a meeting in Dublin on 17 November 2005. The tournament was won by New Zealand, who defeated France 8–7 in the final. The defending champions, South Africa, were eliminated by Australia 11–9 in the quarter-finals. The result marked the third time that the tournament was won by the country that hosted the event (following New Zealand in 1987 and South Africa in 1995).

It was the largest sporting event ever held in New Zealand, eclipsing the 1987 Rugby World Cup, 1990 Commonwealth Games, 1992 Cricket World Cup and the 2003 America's Cup. Overseas visitors to New Zealand for the event totalled 133,000, more than the 95,000 that the organisers expected. However, there was a drop in non-event visitors, meaning the net increase in visitors over the previous year was less than 80,000.

The games ran over six weeks, commencing on 9 September 2011 with the opening ceremony showcasing New Zealand's history and diverse cultures. The final was played at Eden Park in Auckland on 23 October 2011, a date chosen because it fell on a long weekend of New Zealand's Labour Day holiday.

After speculation that the number of participating teams would be reduced to 16, the IRB announced on 30 November 2007 that the 2011 tournament would again feature 20 teams. Twelve teams qualified as a result of finishing in the top three in each pool in the 2007 tournament. The remaining eight berths were determined by regional qualifying tournaments. Of the 20 countries that competed in the previous World Cup in 2007, there was only one change – Russia replaced Portugal.

== Host selection ==
Three nations bid to host the 2011 Rugby World Cup – New Zealand, Japan, and South Africa.

New Zealand had co-hosted the first Rugby World Cup with Australia in 1987, and had been set to co-host the 2003 World Cup with Australia before a disagreement over ground signage rights resulted in New Zealand being dropped and Australia became the sole host. The 2011 New Zealand bid contained plans to enlarge the size of Eden Park and other stadiums to help increase the commercial viability of the bid.

Japan was bidding to become the first Asian nation to host the first Rugby World Cup. Japan had the necessary infrastructure already in place, by virtue of its co-hosting the 2002 FIFA World Cup.

South Africa had hosted the tournament in 1995. The 2011 South African bid, led by former national captain Francois Pienaar, had strong support from their national government. South Africa had also won the right to host the 2010 FIFA World Cup.

The IRB Council meeting in Dublin on 17 November 2005 announced that New Zealand had been selected after IRB inspections of each applicant host nation during June and July 2005.

== Preparations ==
=== Costs and benefits ===
The event was expected to cost about NZ$310 million to run and to generate NZ$280 million in ticket sales. In Auckland, the city where many of the most important games took place, the costs to the local ratepayers alone was estimated at $102 million.

Ticket sales exceeding NZ$285 million, accommodation-related spending of another NZ$260 million, and NZ$236 million spent on food and drink was expected to provide a significant fiscal stimulus, of nearly 1.4% of the quarterly GDP.

=== Concerns ===
In the years between winning the bid and the staging of the event, New Zealand news media and social agencies cast aspersions on the nation's readiness and appropriate use of national funds for sports infrastructure, as has happened with most large, international, quadrennial, multi-location sporting events of recent decades such as the 2012 Olympics, 2010 FIFA World Cup and the 2010 Commonwealth Games. Concerns were raised about the process of upgrading Eden Park to expand the capacity to the 60,000 required by the IRB. In late 2008 Rugby World Cup Minister Murray McCully said the remaining consent process might need to be overridden by legislation for the work to be completed on time.

A July 2009 report by the Auckland Regional Transport Authority, released under the Official Information Act, warned of lack of readiness and complacency, despite the fact that "the levels of patron movement and operational standard [needed for the RWC] are in reality significantly above what is currently delivered." The report was dismissed by Michael Barnett, the Auckland Chamber of Commerce CEO and planning co-coordinator for RWC events in Auckland, who characterised it as a case of "a Wellington media organisation us[ing] an outdated report".

The nation's largest hospitality workers' union, Unite, which represents 25% of hotel, restaurant and casino workers in New Zealand, demanded that workers share in windfall profits and said there was the possibility of a strike during the tournament.

The construction of Dunedin's Forsyth Barr Stadium, known during the tournament as Otago Stadium, was a source of concern as the project was operating in a tight time frame. An April 2010 progress report stated that the project remained on target for completion prior to the Rugby World Cup, although there was a medium level of risk with some significant and potentially damaging concerns. If the project had not been completed on time, organisers would have reverted to Carisbrook as the backup option. Forsyth Barr Stadium was officially opened on 6 August 2011.

Damage caused by the 2011 Christchurch earthquake forced the relocation of a number of cup matches, including the quarter-finals.

=== Warm-up matches ===
The 2011 Tri Nations Series was shortened to include only six games instead of the usual nine. It served as the primary preparation for the tournament for Australia, South Africa and New Zealand. In the northern hemisphere, a series of friendlies played in August 2011 replaced the annual tours to the southern hemisphere. North American entrants Canada beat USA in two warm-up friendlies in August 2011.

== Qualifying ==
Twenty teams competed in the 2011 World Cup. Twelve teams qualified by finishing in the top three of their pool in the 2007 Rugby World Cup.

Twelve of the nations at this tournament had competed in every previous Rugby World Cup – Argentina, Australia, Canada, England, France, Ireland, Italy, Japan, New Zealand, Romania, Scotland, and Wales. All the other sides also had previous World Cup experience, except for Russia who appeared in a Rugby World Cup for the first time.

=== Qualified teams ===
The following 20 teams, shown with final pre-tournament rankings, qualified for the final tournament.

ARFU (1)

- Japan (13)

CAR (2)

- Namibia (20)
- South Africa (3)

CONSUR (1)

- Argentina (9)

FIRA–AER (9)

- England (5)
- France (4)
- Ireland (8)
- Italy (11)
- Romania (17)
- Scotland (7)
- Georgia (16)
- Russia (19)
- Wales (6)

FORU (5)

- Australia (2)
- Fiji (15)
- New Zealand (1)
- Samoa (10)
- Tonga (12)

NACRA (2)

- Canada (14)
- United States (18)

== Venues ==
The 13 venues for the 2011 Rugby World Cup were confirmed on 12 March 2009. A number of the venues were redeveloped to increase capacity for the event. The Government considered passing a law bypassing the consent process to allow all the stadiums' redevelopment to be completed in time.

Due to damage to Stadium Christchurch and many other facilities in Christchurch caused by the earthquake on 22 February 2011, it was announced on 16 March that the matches to be played in the city would be relocated. The two quarter-finals scheduled would be moved to Auckland, while the five pool matches moved to other centres.

On 10 November 2006, the New Zealand Government announced plans for Stadium New Zealand in Auckland. The proposal was to build the new stadium seating 70,000 on the waterfront. After much public outcry, and lack of support from the Auckland Regional Council, the proposal was dropped in favour of the redevelopment of Eden Park. The redevelopment of Eden Park's Southern and South Western stands was completed during 2010.

Dunedin's new stadium, Forsyth Barr Stadium (known as Otago Stadium during the tournament), was completed in August 2011 and was used instead of Carisbrook.

Auckland		Wellington	Dunedin
Eden Park	North Harbour Stadium	Wellington Regional Stadium	Otago Stadium
Capacity: 60,000^{1}	Capacity: 22,000	Capacity: 34,500^{1}	Capacity: 30,748
Hamilton	Location of the 12 stadia to host matches at the 2011 Rugby World Cup		Rotorua
Waikato Stadium	Location of the 12 stadia to host matches at the 2011 Rugby World Cup		Rotorua Int'l Stadium
Capacity: 25,800	Location of the 12 stadia to host matches at the 2011 Rugby World Cup		Capacity: 26,000
New Plymouth	Location of the 12 stadia to host matches at the 2011 Rugby World Cup		Nelson
Stadium Taranaki	Location of the 12 stadia to host matches at the 2011 Rugby World Cup		Trafalgar Park
Capacity: 26,000	Location of the 12 stadia to host matches at the 2011 Rugby World Cup		Expansion to 18,000
Invercargill	Whangārei	Napier	Palmerston North
Rugby Park Stadium	Northland Events Centre	McLean Park	Arena Manawatu
Capacity: 18,000	Capacity: 30,000	Expansion to 19,700	Expansion to 15,000

- ^1with temporary seating

== Draw ==
Seeding of teams for the 2011 World Cup was based on their respective IRB World Rankings. The top four at the 2007 Rugby World Cup (South Africa, England, Argentina, and France) were not therefore allocated top pool spots, but "the rankings are now very well established and provide us with a credible and succinct way of seeding teams for the rugby World Cup pool draw", according to Rugby World Cup Ltd (RWCL) chairman Syd Millar.

The draw was conducted in December 2008 and used the World Rankings as of 1 December 2008, after the Northern Hemisphere Autumn internationals. The teams were placed into three bands depending on their seedings at the time, with one team from each band in each of the pools. The rankings and bands were therefore: New Zealand (1), South Africa (2), Australia (3) and Argentina (4); Wales (5), England (6), France (7) and Ireland (8); Scotland (9), Fiji (10), Italy (11) and Tonga (12).

The full draw and venues for the tournament were announced on 12 March 2009.

The opening match saw the hosts, New Zealand, take on Tonga.

By coincidence, the final match and third-place playoff match were between the countries which contested the same matches at the first Rugby World Cup, which were also held in New Zealand, in 1987.

== Squads ==
Each country was allowed a squad of 30 players for the tournament. These squads were to be submitted to the International Rugby Board by a deadline of 22 August 2011. Once the squad was submitted a player could be replaced if injured, but would not be allowed to return to the squad. There is also a stand-down period of 72 hours before the new player is allowed to take the field. Hence, a replacement player called into a squad on the eve of a game will not be permitted to play in that game.

== Match officials ==
On 8 April 2011, the IRB named ten referees, seven assistant referees and four television match officials to handle the pool stage games. Two of the seven assistants will also be reserve referees if required.

Referees

- (England) Wayne Barnes
- (Ireland) George Clancy
- (South Africa) Craig Joubert
- (South Africa) Jonathan Kaplan
- (New Zealand) Bryce Lawrence
- (Wales) Nigel Owens
- (England) Dave Pearson
- (France) Romain Poite
- (Ireland) Alain Rolland
- (New Zealand) Steve Walsh

Reserve and assistant referees

- (France) Jérôme Garcès
- (New Zealand) Chris Pollock

Assistant referees

- (Italy) Carlo Damasco
- (Wales) Tim Hayes
- (Ireland) Simon McDowell
- (New Zealand) Vinny Munro
- (England) Stuart Terheege

Television match officials

- (Italy) Giulio De Santis
- (Australia) Matt Goddard
- (England) Graham Hughes
- (South Africa) Shaun Veldsman

== Opening ceremony ==
The opening ceremony for the 2011 Rugby World Cup took place at Eden Park in Auckland on 9 September 2011 at 19:30 (NZST). The ceremony featured a blend of traditional Māori and modern New Zealand culture, and began with a fleet of 26 waka entering the city harbour. It featured traditional haka and sipi tau dances in reference to the opening match between New Zealand and Tonga, and ended with a large pyrotechnics display.

== Pool stage ==
Pool A	Pool B	Pool C	Pool D
New Zealand; France; Tonga; Canada; Japan	Argentina; England; Scotland; Georgia; Romania	Australia; Ireland; Italy; United States; Russia	South Africa; Wales; Samoa; Fiji; Namibia

The first round, or pool stage, saw the twenty teams divided into four pools of five teams using the same format that was used in 2003 and in 2007. Each pool was a round-robin of ten games, where each team played one match against each of the other teams in the same pool. Teams were awarded four points for a win, two points for a draw and none for a defeat. A team scoring four or more tries in one match scored a bonus point, as did a team losing by seven or fewer points.

The teams finishing in the top two of each pool advanced to the quarter-finals. The top three teams of each pool have automatically qualified for the 2015 Rugby World Cup.

Tie-breaking criteria

If two or more teams were tied on match points, the following tiebreakers would have applied:

1. The winner of the match between the two teams (would not apply if more than two teams were tied);
2. Difference between points scored for and points scored against in all pool matches;
3. Difference between tries scored for and tries scored against in all pool matches;
4. Points scored in all pool matches;
5. Most tries scored in all pool matches;
6. Official IRB World Rankings as of 3 October 2011.

Key to colours in pool tables
Advanced to the quarter-finals and qualified for the 2015 Men's Rugby World Cup
Eliminated but qualified for 2015 Men's Rugby World Cup

=== Pool A ===
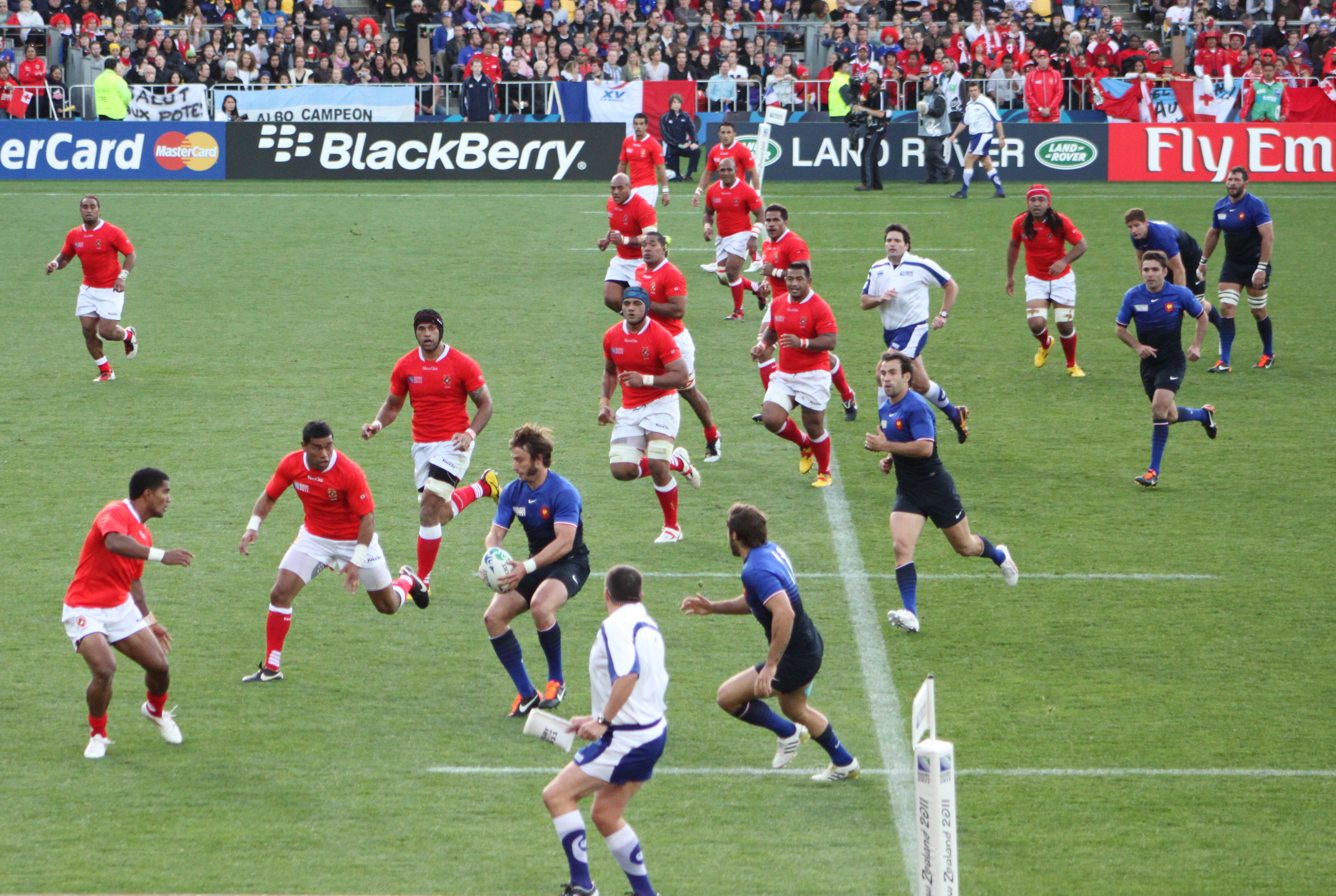
France vs Tonga at Regional Stadium, Wellington. Tonga won 19–14.

Pos	Team	Pld	W	D	L	PF	PA	PD	T	B	Pts
1	New Zealand	4	4	0	0	240	49	+191	36	4	20
2	France	4	2	0	2	124	96	+28	13	3	11
3	Tonga	4	2	0	2	80	98	−18	7	1	9
4	Canada	4	1	1	2	82	168	−86	9	0	6
5	Japan	4	0	1	3	69	184	−115	8	0	2

9 September 2011	New Zealand	41–10	Tonga	Eden Park, Auckland
10 September 2011	France	47–21	Japan	North Harbour Stadium, Auckland
14 September 2011	Tonga	20–25	Canada	Northland Events Centre, Whangārei
16 September 2011	New Zealand	83–7	Japan	Waikato Stadium, Hamilton
18 September 2011	France	46–19	Canada	McLean Park, Napier
21 September 2011	Tonga	31–18	Japan	Northland Events Centre, Whangārei
24 September 2011	New Zealand	37–17	France	Eden Park, Auckland
27 September 2011	Canada	23–23	Japan	McLean Park, Napier
1 October 2011	France	14–19	Tonga	Regional Stadium, Wellington
2 October 2011	New Zealand	79–15	Canada	Regional Stadium, Wellington

=== Pool B ===
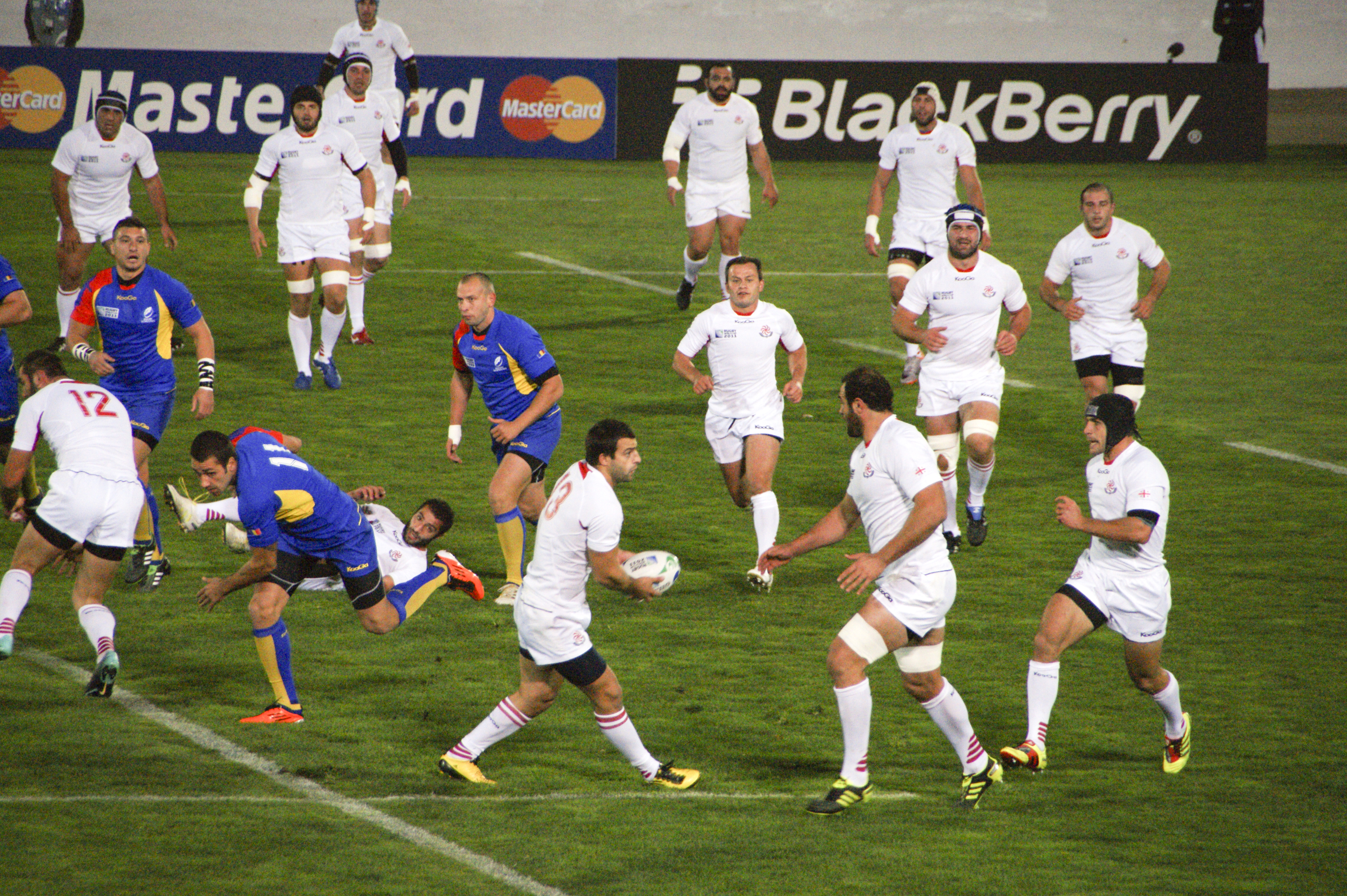
Georgia vs Romania at Arena Manawatu, Palmerston North. Georgia won 25–9.

Pos	Team	Pld	W	D	L	PF	PA	PD	T	B	Pts
1	England	4	4	0	0	137	34	+103	18	2	18
2	Argentina	4	3	0	1	90	40	+50	10	2	14
3	Scotland	4	2	0	2	73	59	+14	4	3	11
4	Georgia	4	1	0	3	48	90	−42	3	0	4
5	Romania	4	0	0	4	44	169	−125	3	0	0

10 September 2011	Scotland	34–24	Romania	Rugby Park Stadium, Invercargill
10 September 2011	Argentina	9–13	England	Otago Stadium, Dunedin
14 September 2011	Scotland	15–6	Georgia	Rugby Park Stadium, Invercargill
17 September 2011	Argentina	43–8	Romania	Rugby Park Stadium, Invercargill
18 September 2011	England	41–10	Georgia	Otago Stadium, Dunedin
24 September 2011	England	67–3	Romania	Otago Stadium, Dunedin
25 September 2011	Argentina	13–12	Scotland	Regional Stadium, Wellington
28 September 2011	Georgia	25–9	Romania	Arena Manawatu, Palmerston North
1 October 2011	England	16–12	Scotland	Eden Park, Auckland
2 October 2011	Argentina	25–7	Georgia	Arena Manawatu, Palmerston North

=== Pool C ===
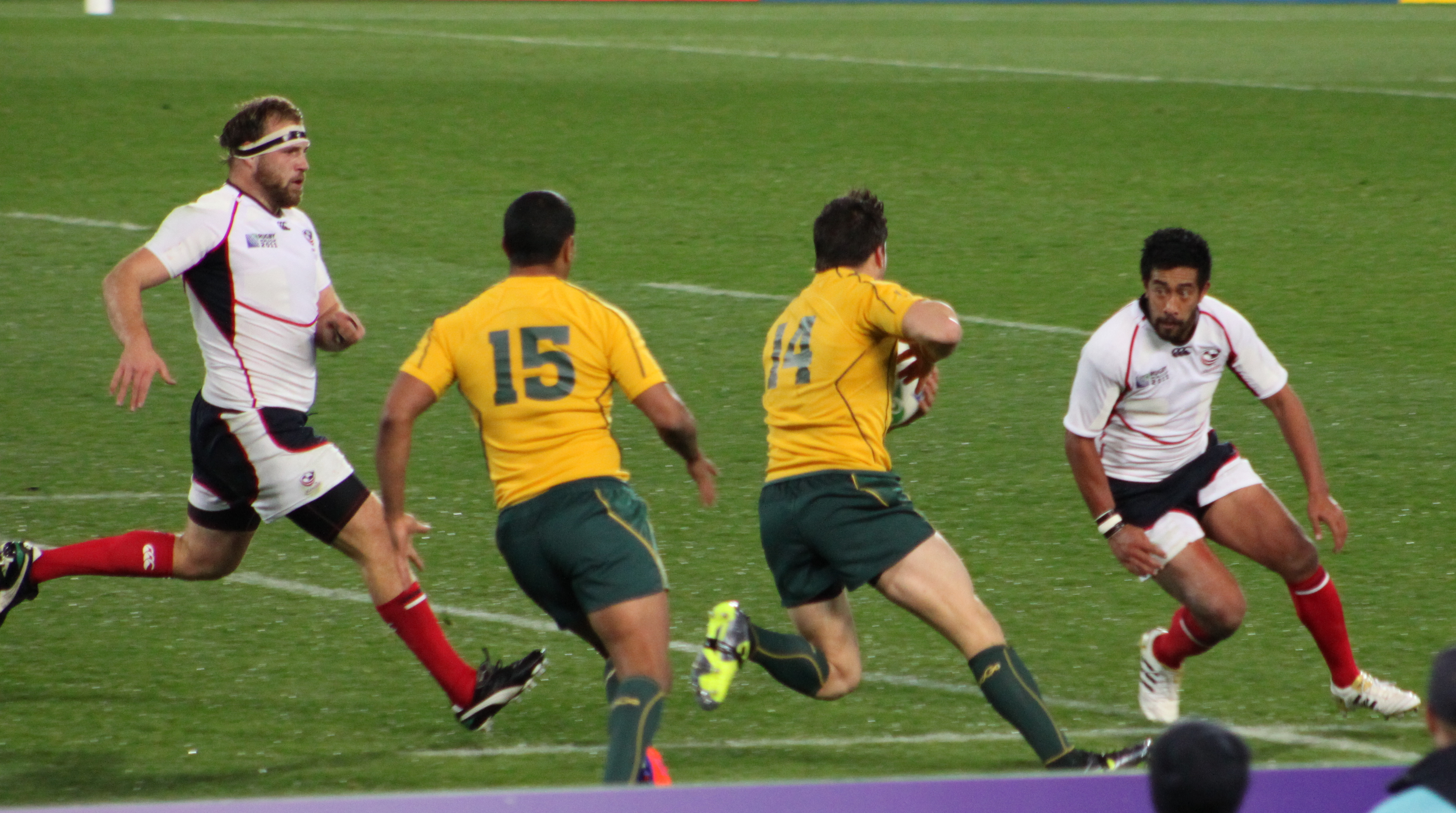
Australia vs USA at Regional Stadium, Wellington. Australia won 67–5.

Pos	Team	Pld	W	D	L	PF	PA	PD	T	B	Pts
1	Ireland	4	4	0	0	135	34	+101	15	1	17
2	Australia	4	3	0	1	173	48	+125	25	3	15
3	Italy	4	2	0	2	92	95	−3	13	2	10
4	United States	4	1	0	3	38	122	−84	4	0	4
5	Russia	4	0	0	4	57	196	−139	8	1	1

11 September 2011	Australia	32–6	Italy	North Harbour Stadium, Auckland
11 September 2011	Ireland	22–10	United States	Stadium Taranaki, New Plymouth
15 September 2011	Russia	6–13	United States	Stadium Taranaki, New Plymouth
17 September 2011	Australia	6–15	Ireland	Eden Park, Auckland
20 September 2011	Italy	53–17	Russia	Trafalgar Park, Nelson
23 September 2011	Australia	67–5	United States	Regional Stadium, Wellington
25 September 2011	Ireland	62–12	Russia	International Stadium, Rotorua
27 September 2011	Italy	27–10	United States	Trafalgar Park, Nelson
1 October 2011	Australia	68–22	Russia	Trafalgar Park, Nelson
2 October 2011	Ireland	36–6	Italy	Otago Stadium, Dunedin

=== Pool D ===
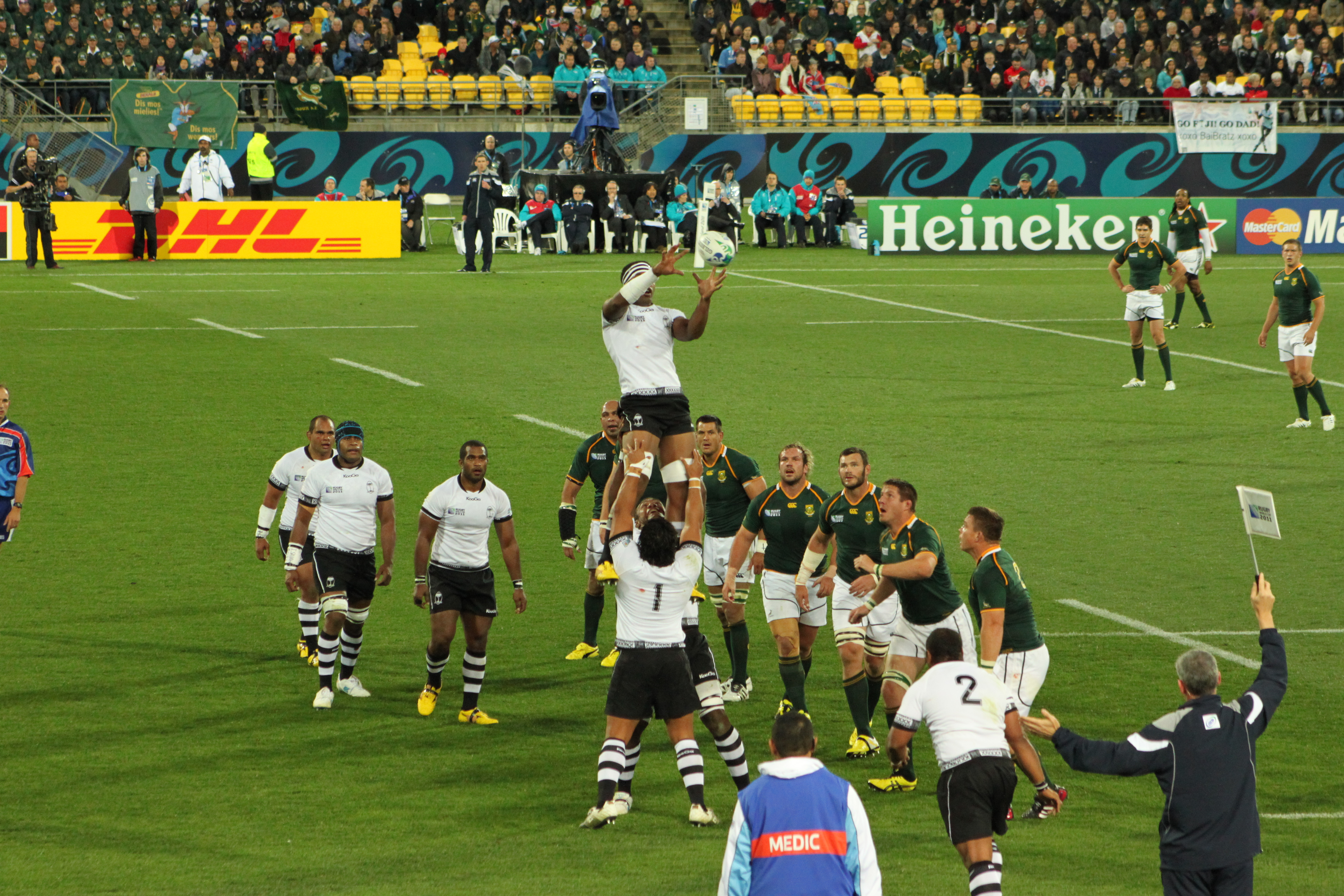
South Africa vs Fiji at Regional Stadium, Wellington. South Africa won 49–3

Pos	Team	Pld	W	D	L	PF	PA	PD	T	B	Pts
1	South Africa	4	4	0	0	166	24	+142	21	2	18
2	Wales	4	3	0	1	180	34	+146	23	3	15
3	Samoa	4	2	0	2	91	49	+42	9	2	10
4	Fiji	4	1	0	3	59	167	−108	7	1	5
5	Namibia	4	0	0	4	44	266	−222	5	0	0

10 September 2011	Fiji	49–25	Namibia	International Stadium, Rotorua
11 September 2011	South Africa	17–16	Wales	Regional Stadium, Wellington
14 September 2011	Samoa	49–12	Namibia	International Stadium, Rotorua
17 September 2011	South Africa	49–3	Fiji	Regional Stadium, Wellington
18 September 2011	Wales	17–10	Samoa	Waikato Stadium, Hamilton
22 September 2011	South Africa	87–0	Namibia	North Harbour Stadium, Auckland
25 September 2011	Fiji	7–27	Samoa	Eden Park, Auckland
26 September 2011	Wales	81–7	Namibia	Stadium Taranaki, New Plymouth
30 September 2011	South Africa	13–5	Samoa	North Harbour Stadium, Auckland
2 October 2011	Wales	66–0	Fiji	Waikato Stadium, Hamilton

== Knockout stage ==
Quarter-finals
8 October – Wellington
Ireland	10
Wales	22
8 October – Auckland (Eden)
England	12
France	19
9 October – Wellington
South Africa	9
Australia	11
9 October – Auckland (Eden)
New Zealand	33
Argentina	10

Semi-finals
15 October – Auckland (Eden)
Wales	8
France	9
16 October – Auckland (Eden)
Australia	6
New Zealand	20

Final
23 October – Auckland (Eden)
France	7
New Zealand	8
Third place
21 October – Auckland (Eden)
Wales	18
Australia	21

=== Quarter-finals ===
8 October 2011
18:00 NZDT (UTC+13)

Ireland	10–22	Wales
Try: Earls 45' c Con: O'Gara (1/1); Pen: O'Gara (1/1) 24'	Report	Try: Williams 3' c Phillips 51' m J. Davies 64' c Con: Priestland (2/3); Pen: Halfpenny (1/1) 29'

Regional Stadium, Wellington
Attendance: 35,787
Referee: Craig Joubert (South Africa)

8 October 2011
20:30 NZDT (UTC+13)

England	12–19	France
Try: Foden 55' c Cueto 77' m Con: Wilkinson (1/1)		Try: Clerc 22' m Médard 31' m Pen: Yachvili (2/3) 11', 16'; Drop: Trinh-Duc (1/1) 73'

Eden Park, Auckland
Attendance: 49,105
Referee: Steve Walsh (Australia)

9 October 2011
18:00 NZDT (UTC+13)

South Africa	9–11	Australia
Pen: M. Steyn (2/4) 39', 56'; Drop: M. Steyn (1/1) 60'	Report	Try: Horwill 11' m Pen: O'Connor (2/2) 17', 72'

Regional Stadium, Wellington
Attendance: 34,914
Referee: Bryce Lawrence (New Zealand)

9 October 2011
20:30 NZDT (UTC+13)

New Zealand	33–10	Argentina
Try: Read 69' m Thorn 79' c Con: Cruden (1/1); Pen: Weepu (7/7) 13', 26', 36', 40', 50', 59', 73'	Report	Try: Farías Cabello 32' c Con: Contepomi (1/1); Pen: Bosch (1/1) 46'

Eden Park, Auckland
Attendance: 57,192
Referee: Nigel Owens (Wales)

=== Semi-finals ===
15 October 2011
21:00 NZDT (UTC+13)

Wales	8–9	France
Try: Phillips 58' m Pen: Hook (1/3) 8'	Report	Pen: Parra (3/3) 22', 35', 51'

Eden Park, Auckland
Attendance: 58,630
Referee: Alain Rolland (Ireland)

16 October 2011
21:00 NZDT (UTC+13)

Australia	6–20	New Zealand
Pen: O'Connor (1/1) 16'; Drop: Cooper (1/1) 32'	Report	Try: Nonu 6' m Pen: Weepu (4/7) 13', 38', 43', 73'; Drop: Cruden (1/1) 22'

Eden Park, Auckland
Attendance: 60,087
Referee: Craig Joubert (South Africa)

=== Bronze final ===
21 October 2011
20:30 NZDT (UTC+13)

Wales	18–21	Australia
Try: Shane Williams 50' m Halfpenny 80+' c Con: S. Jones (1/1); Pen: Hook (1/2) 20'; S. Jones (1/1) 71'	Report	Try: Barnes 12' c McCalman 76' m Con: O'Connor (1/2); Pen: O'Connor (2/4) 54', 58'; Drop: Barnes (1/1) 68'

Eden Park, Auckland
Attendance: 53,014
Referee: Wayne Barnes (England)

=== Final ===
23 October 2011
21:00 NZDT (UTC+13)

France	7–8	New Zealand
Try: Dusautoir 47' c Con: Trinh-Duc (1/1)	Report	Try: Woodcock 15' m Pen: Donald (1/1) 46'

Eden Park, Auckland
Attendance: 61,079
Referee: Craig Joubert (South Africa)

== Statistics ==
The tournament's top point scorer was South African Morné Steyn, who scored 62 points. Chris Ashton and Vincent Clerc scored the most tries, six in total.

Overall points scorers
Player	Team	Total	Details			
Player	Team	Total	Tries	Conversions	Penalties	Drop goals
Morné Steyn	South Africa	62	2	14	7	1
James O'Connor	Australia	52	1	13	7	0
Kurt Morath	Tonga	45	0	6	11	0
Ronan O'Gara	Ireland	44	0	10	8	0
Piri Weepu	New Zealand	41	0	4	11	0
Dimitri Yachvili	France	39	0	6	9	0
Morgan Parra	France	37	1	4	8	0
Colin Slade	New Zealand	36	1	14	1	0
James Arlidge	Japan	34	2	3	6	0
Chris Ashton	England	30	6	0	0	0
Vincent Clerc	France	30	6	0	0	0

== Players of the tournament ==
Following the completion of the Rugby World Cup, the IRB's Rugby News Service listed the Top 5 players of the 2011 Rugby World Cup. These players were:

- (New Zealand) Israel Dagg
- (New Zealand) Jerome Kaino
- (Wales) Jamie Roberts
- (Ireland) Seán O'Brien
- (Namibia) Jacques Burger

== Broadcasting ==
Sky Network Television, New Zealand's largest subscription television provider, was host broadcaster for the Rugby World Cup, transmitting all matches live and in high-definition coverage. Games were also available on free-to-air networks in New Zealand, but not all pool matches were screened live on free-to-air. Broadcasting rights were allocated throughout the world by the IRB, including highlights, free-to-air and pay-per-view. Over two million New Zealanders, more than half the country's population, watched the final, making it the most viewed television broadcast in the country's history.
