= 2023 Rugby World Cup Pool B =

Grouping in the 2023 Rugby world cup

Pool B of the 2023 Rugby World Cup began on 9 September 2023 and concluded on 8 October 2023. The pool included holders and world-number-two-ranked side South Africa, fellow automatic qualifiers and world-number-one-ranked side Ireland, and world-number-five-ranked side Scotland. They were joined by Romania and Tonga. It was widely referred to as the "group of death." Ireland topped the group and South Africa placed second, thus allowing both teams to progress.

== Teams ==
Pos.	Team	Band	Confederation	Method of qualification	Date of qualification	Apps.	Last	Previous best performance	World Rugby Rankings	
Pos.	Team	Band	Confederation	Method of qualification	Date of qualification	Apps.	Last	Previous best performance	1 January 2020 (Note: The rankings of 1 January 2020 were used for seeding for the final draw.)	4 September 2023
B1	South Africa	1	Africa	Top 3 in 2019 RWC pool	8 October 2019	8th	2019	Winners (1995, 2007, 2019)	1	2
B2	Ireland	2	Europe	Top 3 in 2019 RWC pool	5 October 2019	10th	2019	Quarter-finals (1987, 1991, 1995, 2003, 2011, 2015, 2019)	5	1
B3	Scotland	3	Europe	Top 3 in 2019 RWC pool	12 October 2019	10th	2019	Fourth place (1991)	9	5
B4	Tonga	4 (Note: As the identity of the Asia/Pacific 1 winners was not known at the time of the final draw, positions in the World Rugby Rankings were not taken into account, and the placeholder in the draw was automatically seeded into band 4.)	Oceania	Asia/Pacific 1	23 July 2022	9th	2019	Pool stage (1987, 1995, 1999, 2003, 2007, 2011, 2015, 2019)	13	15
B5	Romania	5 (Note: As the identity of the Europe 2 winners was not known at the time of the final draw, positions in the World Rugby Rankings were not taken into account, and the placeholder in the draw was automatically seeded into band 5.)	Europe	Europe 2	27 June 2022	9th	2015	Pool stage (1987, 1991, 1995, 1999, 2003, 2007, 2011, 2015)	19	19

== Overview ==
Ireland, ranked 1st in the world, began Pool B with a convincing win of 82–8 over Romania. Twelve tries were scored by eight different players, with only one having not been converted. The second match of the pool saw defending champions South Africa begin their defence against Scotland. South Africa won 18–3 courtesy of tries from Pieter-Steph du Toit and Kurt-Lee Arendse, along with two successful penalties from Manie Libbok. After a six day break, action in the pool returned as Tonga played their first match against Ireland, where the Irish continued their impressive start with a 59–16 victory, including eight tries. The next day, South Africa continued their strong start with an emphatic victory over Romania, in a 76–0 win with twelve tries, including a hat-trick of tries from Cobus Reinach and Makazole Mapimpi. On 23 September, 1st and 2nd in the world rankings Ireland and South Africa went head-to-head, the first time the teams had ever met at a World Cup, and the first time two sides ranked first and second in the world had met in a pool stage match. Ireland emerged victorious with a scoreline of 13–8 in a low-scoring and brutal affair in Saint-Denis, putting the Irish in pole position to top the pool. The next day, Scotland defeated Tonga in a bonus-point victory with a scoreline of 45–17 with seven tries to keep their hopes of progression to the knockout stage alive, while putting Tonga on the brink of elimination.

Going into the penultimate weekend of pool stage fixtures, four teams in the group still held their fate in their own hands. Leaders Ireland faced a bye week, while both Tonga and Scotland faced possible elimination if they lost their match. On 30 September, Scotland hammered Romania with a 84–0 scoreline, a result which officially eliminated Romania from the tournament. Twelve tries were scored by the Scots, including Darcy Graham who provided four of them and Ben Healy converting eleven of them. The result was crucial for Scotland in keeping their hopes of progression from the pool alive, and it left them only trailing South Africa in the standings from the head-to-head tiebreaker. It set up a showdown on the final matchday between Scotland and Ireland for a place in the knockout stage. The next day, South Africa played their final match of the pool as they moved to the brink of qualification to the quarter-finals after securing a 49–18 bonus-point victory over Tonga, a result that officially saw the elimination of the Sea Eagles from the tournament. Seven tries were scored by the Springboks, along with strong kicking from Handré Pollard and Manie Libbok. Ahead of the final matchweek, Ireland vs Scotland would be the deciding match as to who would finish in the top two and progress to the knockout stage.

In the final pair of matches in Pool B, Ireland and Scotland went head-to-head in Saint-Denis in a match that would officially decide the final standings of the two along with South Africa in the pool and who would progress to the knockout stage with all three sides still able to do so. A clinical Ireland ended up coming away with a 36–14 bonus-point victory over the Scots with six tries, including a try from James Lowe inside 70 seconds, to ensure that Ireland qualified as they topped Group B, South Africa qualified in second and Scotland suffered elimination from the tournament as they finished third, but qualified for the 2027 Rugby World Cup. The final match of Pool B took place the following day between Tonga and Romania in Villeneuve-d'Ascq with both sides already confirmed to finish outside of the top three. Tonga came out with a 45–24 bonus-point victory over the Romanians with two tries from Solomone Kata helping push the Tongans to the win and end their World Cup campaign with a victory as they finished fourth in the pool while ending a miserable campaign for Romania who finished fifth with no victories.

== Standings ==
Pos	Team	Pld	W	D	L	PF	PA	PD	TF	TA	B	Pts	Qualification
1	Ireland	4	4	0	0	190	46	+144	27	5	3	19	Advance to knockout stage, and qualification to the 2027 Men's Rugby World Cup
2	South Africa	4	3	0	1	151	34	+117	22	4	3	15	Advance to knockout stage, and qualification to the 2027 Men's Rugby World Cup
3	Scotland	4	2	0	2	146	71	+75	21	10	2	10	Qualification to the 2027 Men's Rugby World Cup
4	Tonga	4	1	0	3	96	177	−81	13	25	1	5	
5	Romania	4	0	0	4	32	287	−255	4	43	0	0	

Source: World Rugby
Rules for classification: Pool stage tiebreakers

== Matches ==
=== Ireland vs Romania ===
9 September 2023
15:30 CEST (UTC+2)

(1 BP) Ireland	82–8	Romania
Try: Gibson-Park 5' c Keenan 13' c Beirne (2) 17' m, 80+3' c Aki (2) 34' c, 75' c Sexton (2) 40' c, 62' c Herring 45' c O'Mahony (2) 50' c, 70' c McCarthy 67' c Con: Sexton (7/8) 6', 13', 36', 40', 46', 51', 63'; Crowley (4/4) 68', 72', 76', 80+3'	Report	Try: Rupanu 3' m Pen: Rupanu (1/1) 21'

Nouveau Stade de Bordeaux, Bordeaux
Attendance: 41,170
Referee: Nika Amashukeli (Georgia)

Ireland	Romania

FB	15	Hugo Keenan
RW	14	Keith Earls	(substituted off) 60'
OC	13	Garry Ringrose
IC	12	Bundee Aki
LW	11	James Lowe
FH	10	Johnny Sexton (c)	(substituted off) 66'
SH	9	Jamison Gibson-Park	(substituted off) 60'
N8	8	Caelan Doris	(substituted off) 56'
OF	7	Peter O'Mahony
BF	6	Tadhg Beirne
RL	5	James Ryan	(substituted off) 56'
LL	4	Joe McCarthy
TP	3	Tadhg Furlong	(substituted off) 51'
HK	2	Rob Herring	(substituted off) 51'
LP	1	Andrew Porter	(substituted off) 51'
Replacements:
HK	16	Rónan Kelleher	(substituted on) 51'
PR	17	Jeremy Loughman	(substituted on) 51'
PR	18	Tom O'Toole	(substituted on) 51'
LK	19	Iain Henderson	(substituted on) 56'
FL	20	Josh van der Flier	(substituted on) 56'
SH	21	Conor Murray	(substituted on) 60'
FH	22	Jack Crowley	(substituted on) 66'
WG	23	Mack Hansen	(substituted on) 60'
Coach:
(England) Andy Farrell

FB	15	Marius Simionescu	(yellow card) 31'
RW	14	Nicolas Onuțu
OC	13	Jason Tomane
IC	12	Fonovai Tangimana
LW	11	Tevita Manumua		(substituted off) 58'
FH	10	Hinckley Vaovasa		(substituted off) 61'
SH	9	Gabriel Rupanu		(substituted off) 74'
N8	8	Cristi Chirică (c)
OF	7	Vlad Neculau
BF	6	Florian Roșu		(substituted off) 61'
RL	5	Ștefan Iancu		(substituted off) 61'
LL	4	Adrian Moțoc
TP	3	Alexandru Gordaș		(substituted off) 52'
HK	2	Ovidiu Cojocaru		(substituted off) 55'
LP	1	Iulian Harțig		(substituted off) 49'
Replacements:
HK	16	Florin Bărdașu		(substituted on) 55'
PR	17	Alexandru Savin		(substituted on) 49'
PR	18	Gheorghe Gajion		(substituted on) 52'
LK	19	Marius Iftimiciuc		(substituted on) 61'
FL	20	Dragoș Ser		(substituted on) 61'
SH	21	Alin Conache		(substituted on) 74'
FH	22	Tudor Boldor		(substituted on) 61'
CE	23	Taylor Gontineac		(substituted on) 58'
Coach:
(Romania) Eugen Apjok

Player of the Match:
Peter O'Mahony (Ireland)

Assistant referees:
Wayne Barnes (England)
Andrea Piardi (Italy)
Television match official:
Brendon Pickerill (New Zealand)

Notes:

- Robbie Henshaw was originally named among the replacements for Ireland, but withdrew before the match as an injury precaution. His place was taken by Mack Hansen.
- This was Ireland's largest ever victory in a Rugby World Cup match, for both total points scored and overall winning margin, and also their largest ever victory over Romania, surpassing the 34–point margin (44–10) set during the 2015 Rugby World Cup.

=== South Africa vs Scotland ===
10 September 2023
17:45 CEST (UTC+2)

South Africa	18–3	Scotland
Try: Du Toit 47' m Arendse 50' c Con: De Klerk (1/1) 51'; Pen: Libbok (2/4) 13', 25'	Report	Pen: Russell (1/1) 40+1'

Stade Vélodrome, Marseille
Attendance: 63,586
Referee: Angus Gardner (Australia)

South Africa	Scotland

FB	15	Damian Willemse
RW	14	Kurt-Lee Arendse
OC	13	Jesse Kriel
IC	12	Damian de Allende
LW	11	Cheslin Kolbe
FH	10	Manie Libbok	(substituted off) 69'
SH	9	Faf de Klerk	(substituted off) 75'
N8	8	Jasper Wiese	(substituted off) 60'
BF	7	Pieter-Steph du Toit
OF	6	Siya Kolisi (c)	(substituted off) 64'
RL	5	Franco Mostert
LL	4	Eben Etzebeth	(substituted off) 26'
TP	3	Frans Malherbe	(substituted off) 53'
HK	2	Malcolm Marx	48' to 53'		(substituted off) 57'
LP	1	Steven Kitshoff	(substituted off) 53'
Replacements:
HK	16	Bongi Mbonambi	(substituted on) 48'	(substituted off) 53'	(substituted on) 57'
PR	17	Ox Nché	(substituted on) 53'
PR	18	Trevor Nyakane	(substituted on) 53'
LK	19	RG Snyman	(substituted on) 26'
FL	20	Marco van Staden	(substituted on) 64'
N8	21	Duane Vermeulen	(substituted on) 60'
SH	22	Grant Williams	(substituted on) 75'
FB	23	Willie le Roux	(substituted on) 69'
Coach:
(South Africa) Jacques Nienaber

FB	15	Blair Kinghorn
RW	14	Darcy Graham	(substituted off) 64'
OC	13	Huw Jones
IC	12	Sione Tuipilotu	(substituted off) 67'
LW	11	Duhan van der Merwe
FH	10	Finn Russell
SH	9	Ben White	(substituted off) 67'
N8	8	Jack Dempsey
OF	7	Rory Darge	(substituted off) 64'
BF	6	Jamie Ritchie (c)
RL	5	Grant Gilchrist	(substituted off) 56'
LL	4	Richie Gray
TP	3	Zander Fagerson	(substituted off) 56'
HK	2	George Turner	(substituted off) 56'
LP	1	Pierre Schoeman	(substituted off) 56'
Replacements:
HK	16	Dave Cherry	(substituted on) 56'
PR	17	Jamie Bhatti	(substituted on) 56'
PR	18	WP Nel	(substituted on) 56'
LK	19	Scott Cummings	(substituted on) 56'
FL	20	Matt Fagerson	(substituted on) 64'
SH	21	Ali Price	(substituted on) 67'
CE	22	Cameron Redpath	(substituted on) 67'
FB	23	Ollie Smith	(substituted on) 64'
Coach:
(Scotland) Gregor Townsend

Player of the Match:
Manie Libbok (South Africa)

Assistant referees:
Nika Amashukeli (Georgia)
Jordan Way (Australia)
Television match official:
Ben Whitehouse (Wales)

Notes:

- Faf de Klerk (South Africa) earned his 50th test cap.

=== Ireland vs Tonga ===
16 September 2023
21:00 CEST (UTC+2)

(1 BP) Ireland	59–16	Tonga
Try: Beirne 21' c Doris 27' c Hansen 33' c Sexton 38' c Lowe 59' c Aki (2) 63' c, 69' c Herring 80' c Con: Sexton (4/4) 22', 28', 34', 39'; Byrne (4/4) 60', 64', 70', 80+2'; Pen: Sexton (1/1) 7'	Report	Try: V. Fifita 40+8' c Con: Havili (1/1) 40+9'; Pen: Havili (3/3) 16', 25', 43'

Stade de la Beaujoire, Nantes
Attendance: 31,673
Referee: Wayne Barnes (England)

Ireland	Tonga

FB	15	Hugo Keenan
RW	14	Mack Hansen
OC	13	Garry Ringrose		(substituted off) 50'
IC	12	Bundee Aki
LW	11	James Lowe
FH	10	Johnny Sexton (c)		(substituted off) 41'
SH	9	Conor Murray		(substituted off) 56'
N8	8	Caelan Doris		(substituted off) 52'
OF	7	Josh van der Flier
BF	6	Peter O'Mahony	(yellow card) 40+3'
RL	5	James Ryan		(substituted off) 50'
LL	4	Tadhg Beirne
TP	3	Tadhg Furlong		(substituted off) 41'	(substituted on) 50'
HK	2	Rónan Kelleher		(substituted off) 41'
LP	1	Andrew Porter		(substituted off) 41'
Replacements:
HK	16	Rob Herring		(substituted on) 41'
PR	17	Dave Kilcoyne		(substituted on) 41'
PR	18	Finlay Bealham		(substituted on) 41'	(substituted off) 50'
LK	19	Iain Henderson		(substituted on) 50'
FL	20	Ryan Baird		(substituted on) 52'
SH	21	Craig Casey		(substituted on) 56'
FH	22	Ross Byrne		(substituted on) 41'
CE	23	Robbie Henshaw		(substituted on) 50'
Coach:
(England) Andy Farrell

FB	15	Salesi Piutau
RW	14	Afusipa Taumoepeau
OC	13	Malakai Fekitoa
IC	12	Pita Ahki
LW	11	Solomone Kata	(substituted off) 71'
FH	10	William Havili
SH	9	Augustine Pulu	(substituted off) 41'
N8	8	Vaea Fifita	(substituted off) 60'
OF	7	Sione Havili Talitui
BF	6	Tanginoa Halaifonua	(substituted off) 50'
RL	5	Leva Fifita	(substituted off) 71'
LL	4	Sam Lousi
TP	3	Ben Tameifuna (c)	(substituted off) 60'
HK	2	Paul Ngauamo	(substituted off) 50'
LP	1	Siegfried Fisiʻihoi	(substituted off) 60'
Replacements:
HK	16	Sam Moli	(substituted on) 50'
PR	17	Tau Koloamatangi	(substituted on) 60'
PR	18	Joe Apikotoa	(substituted on) 60'
LK	19	Semisi Paea	(substituted on) 71'
FL	20	Solomone Funaki	(substituted on) 52'
N8	21	Sione Vailanu	(substituted on) 60'
SH	22	Sonatane Takulua	(substituted on) 41'
CE	23	Fine Inisi	(substituted on) 71'
Coach:
(Australia) Toutai Kefu

Player of the Match:
Bundee Aki (Ireland)

Assistant referees:
Matthew Carley (England)
Craig Evans (Wales)
Television match official:
Tom Foley (England)

Notes:

- This was the first match between Ireland and Tonga at a Rugby World Cup since the inaugural tournament in 1987, when the two nations met in the pool stages.
- Johnny Sexton became Ireland's all-time top points scorer, breaking the previous record of 1,083 points which was held by Ronan O'Gara.

=== South Africa vs Romania ===
17 September 2023
15:00 CEST (UTC+2)

(1 BP) South Africa	76–0	Romania
Try: Reinach (3) 2' m, 8' c, 23' c Mapimpi (3) 6' c, 63' m, 67' c Willemse 11' c Fourie 42' m Penalty try 52'; Williams (2) 54' c, 61' c Le Roux 73' m Con: Willemse (5/7) 7', 9', 11', 24', 55'; De Klerk (2/4) 62', 68'	Report

Nouveau Stade de Bordeaux, Bordeaux
Attendance: 38,789
Referee: Mathieu Raynal (France)

South Africa	Romania

FB	15	Willie le Roux
RW	14	Grant Williams
OC	13	Canan Moodie
IC	12	André Esterhuizen
LW	11	Makazole Mapimpi
FH	10	Damian Willemse	(substituted off) 57'
SH	9	Cobus Reinach	(substituted off) 46'
N8	8	Duane Vermeulen
BF	7	Kwagga Smith
OF	6	Marco van Staden
RL	5	Marvin Orie	(substituted off) 41'
LL	4	Jean Kleyn
TP	18	Trevor Nyakane	(substituted off) 60'
HK	2	Bongi Mbonambi (c)	(substituted off) 40'
LP	1	Ox Nché	(substituted off) 60'
Replacements:
HK	16	Deon Fourie	(substituted on) 40'
PR	17	Steven Kitshoff	(substituted on) 60'
PR	28	Frans Malherbe	(substituted on) 60'
LK	19	RG Snyman	(substituted on) 41'
N8	20	Jasper Wiese
SH	21	Jaden Hendrikse	(substituted on) 46'
SH	22	Faf de Klerk	(substituted on) 57'
CE	23	Jesse Kriel
Coach:
(South Africa) Jacques Nienaber

FB	15	Marius Simionescu
RW	14	Tevita Manumua
OC	13	Jason Tomane	(substituted off) 60'
IC	12	Taylor Gontineac	(substituted off) 67'
LW	11	Nicolas Onuțu
FH	10	Hinckley Vaovasa
SH	9	Gabriel Rupanu
N8	8	Cristi Chirică (c)
OF	7	Vlad Neculau	(substituted off) 41'
BF	6	André Gorin	(substituted off) 55'
RL	5	Marius Iftimiciuc	(substituted off) 52'
LL	4	Adrian Moțoc
TP	3	Alexandru Gordaș	(substituted off) 51'
HK	2	Ovidiu Cojocaru	(substituted off) 60'
LP	1	Iulian Harțig	(substituted off) 57'
Replacements:
HK	16	Robert Irimescu	(substituted on) 60'
PR	17	Alexandru Savin	(substituted on) 57'
PR	18	Thomas Crețu	(substituted on) 51'
LK	19	Ștefan Iancu	(substituted on) 52'
FL	20	Damian Strătilă	(substituted on) 55'
FL	21	Cristi Boboc	(substituted on) 41'
SH	22	Alin Conache	(substituted on) 67'
FH	23	Gabriel Pop	(substituted on) 60'
Coach:
(Romania) Eugen Apjok

Player of the Match:
Makazole Mapimpi (South Africa)

Assistant referees:
Angus Gardner (Australia)
Pierre Brousset (France)
Television match official:
Brett Cronan (Australia)

Notes:

- South Africa secured the fastest ever try bonus point (earned by scoring four tries) in a World Cup match, achieving this feat 11 minutes and 13 seconds after kick-off.
- Vincent Koch was originally named in the starting line-up for South Africa, but withdrew during the match-day warm-up due to injury. He was replaced by Trevor Nyakane, whose place on the bench was taken by Frans Malherbe. Nyakane continued to wear the number 18 shirt, while Malherbe wore 28.

=== South Africa vs Ireland ===
23 September 2023
21:00 CEST (UTC+2)

(1 BP) South Africa	8–13	Ireland
Try: Kolbe 51' m Pen: Libbok (1/2) 6'	Report	Try: Hansen 33' c Con: Sexton (1/1) 35'; Pen: Sexton (1/1) 59'; Crowley (1/1) 77'

Stade de France, Saint-Denis
Attendance: 78,542
Referee: Ben O'Keeffe (New Zealand)

South Africa	Ireland

FB	15	Damian Willemse
RW	14	Kurt-Lee Arendse
OC	13	Jesse Kriel
IC	12	Damian de Allende
LW	11	Cheslin Kolbe
FH	10	Manie Libbok
SH	9	Faf de Klerk	(substituted off) 75'
N8	8	Jasper Wiese	(substituted off) 48'
BF	7	Pieter-Steph du Toit
OF	6	Siya Kolisi (c)	(substituted off) 51'
RL	5	Franco Mostert	(substituted off) 48'
LL	4	Eben Etzebeth	(substituted off) 48'
TP	3	Frans Malherbe	(substituted off) 62'
HK	2	Bongi Mbonambi	(substituted off) 64'
LP	1	Steven Kitshoff	(substituted off) 48'
Replacements:
HK	16	Deon Fourie	(substituted on) 64'
PR	17	Ox Nché	(substituted on) 48'
PR	18	Trevor Nyakane	(substituted on) 62'
LK	19	Jean Kleyn	(substituted on) 48'
LK	20	RG Snyman	(substituted on) 48'
FL	21	Marco van Staden	(substituted on) 51'
FL	22	Kwagga Smith	(substituted on) 48'
SH	23	Cobus Reinach	(substituted on) 75'
Coach:
(South Africa) Jacques Nienaber

FB	15	Hugo Keenan
RW	14	Mack Hansen
OC	13	Garry Ringrose	22' to 35'		(substituted off) 64'
IC	12	Bundee Aki
LW	11	James Lowe
FH	10	Johnny Sexton (c)	(substituted off) 73'
SH	9	Jamison Gibson-Park	(substituted off) 66'
N8	8	Caelan Doris
OF	7	Josh van der Flier
BF	6	Peter O'Mahony	(substituted off) 64'
RL	5	James Ryan	(substituted off) 53'
LL	4	Tadhg Beirne
TP	3	Tadhg Furlong	(substituted off) 64'
HK	2	Rónan Kelleher	(substituted off) 53'
LP	1	Andrew Porter	(substituted off) 75'
Replacements:
HK	16	Dan Sheehan	(substituted on) 53'
PR	17	Dave Kilcoyne	(substituted on) 75'
PR	18	Finlay Bealham	(substituted on) 64'
LK	19	Iain Henderson	(substituted on) 53'
FL	20	Ryan Baird	(substituted on) 64'
SH	21	Conor Murray	(substituted on) 66'
FH	22	Jack Crowley	(substituted on) 73'
CE	23	Robbie Henshaw	(substituted on) 22'	(substituted off) 35'	(substituted on) 64'
Coach:
(England) Andy Farrell

Player of the Match:
Bundee Aki (Ireland)

Assistant referees:
Mathieu Raynal (France)
James Doleman (New Zealand)
Television match official:
Brendon Pickerill (New Zealand)

Notes:

- This was the first ever meeting between these two sides at a World Cup, or at any neutral venue.
- Peter O'Mahony earned his 100th international test cap, having played 99 times for Ireland and once for the British & Irish Lions.
- Bundee Aki earned his 50th test cap for Ireland.

=== Scotland vs Tonga ===
24 September 2023
17:45 CEST (UTC+2)

(1 BP) Scotland	45–17	Tonga
Try: Turner 5' c Van der Merwe 27' m Steyn 30' m Darge 40+2' c Horne 54' c Kinghorn 68' c Graham 80+2' c Con: Russell (5/7) 6', 40+3', 55', 70', 80+3'	Report	Try: Kata 20' c Tameifuna 44' c Con: Havili (2/2) 21', 45'; Pen: Havili (1/1) 10'

Allianz Riviera, Nice
Attendance: 33,189
Referee: Karl Dickson (England)

Scotland	Tonga

FB	15	Blair Kinghorn
RW	14	Kyle Steyn	(substituted off) 48'
OC	13	Chris Harris	(substituted off) 48'
IC	12	Sione Tuipilotu
LW	11	Duhan van der Merwe
FH	10	Finn Russell
SH	9	Ben White	(substituted off) 48'
N8	8	Jack Dempsey
OF	7	Rory Darge
BF	6	Jamie Ritchie (c)	(substituted off) 34'
RL	5	Scott Cummings
LL	4	Richie Gray	(substituted off) 65'
TP	3	Zander Fagerson	(substituted off) 59'
HK	2	George Turner	(substituted off) 59'
LP	1	Rory Sutherland	(substituted off) 48'
Replacements:
HK	16	Ewan Ashman	(substituted on) 59'
PR	17	Pierre Schoeman	(substituted on) 48'
PR	18	WP Nel	(substituted on) 59'
LK	19	Sam Skinner	(substituted on) 65'
FL	20	Matt Fagerson	(substituted on) 34'
SH	21	George Horne	(substituted on) 48'
CE	22	Huw Jones	(substituted on) 48'
WG	23	Darcy Graham	(substituted on) 48'
Coach:
(Scotland) Gregor Townsend

FB	15	Salesi Piutau
RW	14	Solomone Kata
OC	13	Malakai Fekitoa
IC	12	Pita Ahki
LW	11	Afusipa Taumoepeau	(yellow card) 34'
FH	10	William Havili		(substituted off) 77'
SH	9	Augustine Pulu		(substituted off) 55'
N8	8	Vaea Fifita	(red card) 77'
OF	7	Sione Havili Talitui		(substituted off) 70'
BF	6	Tanginoa Halaifonua		(substituted off) 55'
RL	5	Sam Lousi		(substituted off) 55'
LL	4	Leva Fifita
TP	3	Ben Tameifuna (c)		(substituted off) 65'
HK	2	Paul Ngauamo		(substituted off) 52'
LP	1	Siegfried Fisiʻihoi		(substituted off) 70'
Replacements:
HK	16	Sam Moli		(substituted on) 52'
PR	17	Tau Koloamatangi		(substituted on) 70'
PR	18	Joe Apikotoa		(substituted on) 65'
LK	19	Adam Coleman		(substituted on) 55'
FL	20	Semisi Paea		(substituted on) 70'
N8	21	Sione Vailanu		(substituted on) 55'
SH	22	Sonatane Takulua		(substituted on) 55'
FH	23	Patrick Pellegrini		(substituted on) 77'
Coach:
(Australia) Toutai Kefu

Player of the Match:
Duhan van der Merwe (Scotland)

Assistant referees:
Nika Amashukeli (Georgia)
Craig Evans (Wales)
Television match official:
Ben Whitehouse (Wales)

Notes:

- Adam Coleman made his debut for Tonga, having previously represented Australia at test level between 2016 and 2019, earning the last of his 38 caps for the Wallabies at the 2019 Rugby World Cup.
- Patrick Pellegrini (Tonga) made his international debut.

=== Scotland vs Romania ===
30 September 2023
21:00 CEST (UTC+2)

(1 BP) Scotland	84–0	Romania
Try: Watson 9' c Price 17' c Graham (4) 21' c, 34' c, 40' c, 77' c Fagerson 38' c Harris 45' c Smith 53' c Healy 58' c Matthews 71' c Darge 73' c Con: Healy (11/11) 10', 18', 22', 35', 39', 40', 47', 55', 59', 72', 77'; Horne (1/1) 73'	Report

Stade Pierre-Mauroy, Villeneuve-d'Ascq
Attendance: 46,516
Referee: Wayne Barnes (England)

Scotland	Romania

FB	15	Ollie Smith	(substituted off) 59'
RW	14	Darcy Graham
OC	13	Chris Harris	(substituted off) 65'
IC	12	Cameron Redpath
LW	11	Kyle Steyn
FH	10	Ben Healy
SH	9	Ali Price	(substituted off) 55'
N8	8	Matt Fagerson
OF	7	Hamish Watson	(substituted off) 65'
BF	6	Luke Crosbie
RL	5	Grant Gilchrist (c)	(substituted off) 59'
LL	4	Sam Skinner
TP	3	Javan Sebastian	(substituted off) 59'
HK	2	Ewan Ashman	(substituted off) 59'
LP	1	Jamie Bhatti	(substituted off) 59'
Replacements:
HK	16	Johnny Matthews	(substituted on) 59'
PR	17	Rory Sutherland	(substituted on) 59'
PR	18	WP Nel	(substituted on) 59'
LK	19	Scott Cummings	(substituted on) 59'
FL	20	Rory Darge	(substituted on) 65'
SH	21	George Horne	(substituted on) 55'
FB	22	Blair Kinghorn	(substituted on) 59'
CE	23	Huw Jones	(substituted on) 65'
Coach:
(Scotland) Gregor Townsend

FB	15	Marius Simionescu	(yellow card) 38'
RW	14	Sioeli Lama
OC	13	Jason Tomane
IC	12	Fonovai Tangimana		(substituted off) 57'
LW	11	Taliaʻuli Sikuea
FH	10	Alin Conache		(substituted off) 53'
SH	9	Gabriel Rupanu		(substituted off) 32'	(substituted on) 39'	(substituted off) 61'
N8	8	Cristi Chirică (c)		(substituted off) 39'
OF	7	Dragoș Ser
BF	6	Florian Roșu	(yellow card) 31'
RL	5	Ștefan Iancu
LL	4	Adrian Moțoc
TP	3	Gheorghe Gajion		(substituted off) 57'
HK	2	Robert Irimescu	(yellow card) 29'			(substituted off) 59'
LP	1	Alexandru Savin		(substituted off) 61'
Replacements:
HK	16	Florin Bărdașu		(substituted on) 32'	(substituted off) 39'	(substituted on) 59'
PR	17	Iulian Harțig		(substituted on) 61'
PR	18	Costel Burțilă		(substituted on) 57'
LK	19	Marius Iftimiciuc
FL	20	Damian Strătilă		(substituted on) 39'
SH	21	Florin Surugiu				(substituted on) 61'
FH	22	Tudor Boldor		(substituted on) 53'
WG	23	Nicolas Onuțu		(substituted on) 57'
Coach:
(Romania) Eugen Apjok

Player of the Match:
Darcy Graham (Scotland)

Assistant referees:
Angus Gardner (Australia)
James Doleman (New Zealand)
Television match official:
Brendon Pickerill (New Zealand)

Notes:

- This was Scotland's biggest ever victory over Romania, surpassing the 42–point margin (42–0) set during the 2007 Rugby World Cup.
- Scotland kept their opponents scoreless for the sixth time in a World Cup match – the first nation to achieve this feat.
- Johnny Matthews (Scotland) made his international debut.

=== South Africa vs Tonga ===
1 October 2023
21:00 CEST (UTC+2)

(1 BP) South Africa	49–18	Tonga
Try: Reinach 5' c Moodie 20' c Fourie 32' c Kriel 49' c Le Roux 58' c Van Staden 63' c Smith 80+1' c Con: Pollard (4/4) 6', 21', 33', 51'; Libbok (3/3) 59', 65', 80+2'	Report	Try: Tameifuna 38' m Inisi 54' m Pellegrini 73' m Pen: Havili (1/1) 3'

Stade Vélodrome, Marseille
Attendance: 60,387
Referee: Luke Pearce (England)

South Africa	Tonga

FB	15	Willie le Roux
RW	14	Grant Williams
OC	13	Canan Moodie
IC	12	André Esterhuizen
LW	11	Makazole Mapimpi	(substituted off) 29'
FH	10	Handré Pollard	(substituted off) 51'
SH	9	Cobus Reinach	(substituted off) 51'
N8	8	Jasper Wiese	(substituted off) 51'
BF	7	Duane Vermeulen
OF	6	Siya Kolisi (c)	(substituted off) 59'
RL	5	Marvin Orie	(substituted off) 62'
LL	4	Eben Etzebeth
TP	3	Vincent Koch	(substituted off) 45'
HK	2	Deon Fourie
LP	1	Ox Nché	45' to 55'		(substituted off) 59'
Replacements:
HK	16	Marco van Staden	(substituted on) 59'
PR	17	Steven Kitshoff	(substituted on) 45'	(substituted off) 55'	(substituted on) 59'
PR	18	Trevor Nyakane	(substituted on) 45'
LK	19	Franco Mostert	(substituted on) 62'
FL	20	Kwagga Smith	(substituted on) 51'
SH	21	Jaden Hendrikse	(substituted on) 51'
FH	22	Manie Libbok	(substituted on) 51'
CE	23	Jesse Kriel	(substituted on) 29'
Coach:
(South Africa) Jacques Nienaber

FB	15	Salesi Piutau
RW	14	Fine Inisi
OC	13	Malakai Fekitoa	(substituted off) 68'
IC	12	Pita Ahki
LW	11	Anzelo Tuitavuki
FH	10	William Havili	(substituted off) 71'
SH	9	Augustine Pulu	(substituted off) 52'
N8	8	Semisi Paea	(substituted off) 59'
OF	7	Sione Havili Talitui
BF	6	Tanginoa Halaifonua
RL	5	Sam Lousi	(substituted off) 51'
LL	4	Leva Fifita
TP	3	Ben Tameifuna (c)	(substituted off) 55'
HK	2	Paul Ngauamo	(substituted off) 51'	(substituted on) 64'
LP	1	Siegfried Fisiʻihoi	(substituted off) 71'
Replacements:
HK	16	Sam Moli	(substituted on) 51'	(substituted off) 64'
PR	17	Tau Koloamatangi	(substituted on) 71'
PR	18	Joe Apikotoa	(substituted on) 55'
LK	19	Adam Coleman	(substituted on) 51'
N8	20	Sione Vailanu	(substituted on) 59'
SH	21	Sonatane Takulua	(substituted on) 52'
FH	22	Patrick Pellegrini	(substituted on) 71'
CE	23	Afusipa Taumoepeau	(substituted on) 68'
Coach:
(Australia) Toutai Kefu

Player of the Match:
Deon Fourie (South Africa)

Assistant referees:
Matthew Carley (England)
Christophe Ridley (England)
Television match official:
Brett Cronan (Australia)

=== Ireland vs Scotland ===
7 October 2023
21:00 CEST (UTC+2)

(1 BP) Ireland	36–14	Scotland
Try: Lowe 2' m Keenan (2) 26' c, 39' c Henderson 32' c Sheehan 44' m Ringrose 58' m Con: Sexton (3/5) 27', 33', 40'	Report	Try: Ashman 64' c Price 66' c Con: Russell (2/2) 65', 66'

Stade de France, Saint-Denis
Attendance: 78,459
Referee: Nic Berry (Australia)

Ireland	Scotland

FB	15	Hugo Keenan
RW	14	Mack Hansen	21' to 32'		(substituted off) 35'
OC	13	Garry Ringrose
IC	12	Bundee Aki
LW	11	James Lowe	(substituted off) 41'
FH	10	Johnny Sexton (c)	(substituted off) 45'
SH	9	Jamison Gibson-Park
N8	8	Caelan Doris
OF	7	Josh van der Flier
BF	6	Peter O'Mahony	(substituted off) 48'
RL	5	Iain Henderson
LL	4	Tadhg Beirne	(substituted off) 48'
TP	3	Tadhg Furlong	(substituted off) 48'
HK	2	Dan Sheehan	(substituted off) 48'
LP	1	Andrew Porter	(substituted off) 48'
Replacements:
HK	16	Rónan Kelleher	(substituted on) 48'
PR	17	Dave Kilcoyne	(substituted on) 48'
PR	18	Finlay Bealham	(substituted on) 48'
LK	19	James Ryan	(substituted on) 48'
N8	20	Jack Conan	(substituted on) 48'
SH	21	Conor Murray	(substituted on) 41'
FH	22	Jack Crowley	(substituted on) 45'
CE	23	Stuart McCloskey	(substituted on) 21'	(substituted off) 32'	(substituted on) 35'
Coach:
(England) Andy Farrell

FB	15	Blair Kinghorn		(substituted off) 8'
RW	14	Darcy Graham		(substituted off) 50'
OC	13	Huw Jones
IC	12	Sione Tuipilotu
LW	11	Duhan van der Merwe
FH	10	Finn Russell
SH	9	Ali Price
N8	8	Jack Dempsey
OF	7	Rory Darge		(substituted off) 65'
BF	6	Jamie Ritchie (c)		(substituted off) 20'
RL	5	Grant Gilchrist		(substituted off) 45'
LL	4	Richie Gray
TP	3	Zander Fagerson		(substituted off) 60'
HK	2	George Turner		(substituted off) 59'
LP	1	Pierre Schoeman		(substituted off) 53'
Replacements:
HK	16	Ewan Ashman		(substituted on) 59'
PR	17	Rory Sutherland		(substituted on) 53'
PR	18	WP Nel		(substituted on) 60'
LK	19	Scott Cummings		(substituted on) 45'
FL	20	Matt Fagerson		(substituted on) 20'
FL	21	Luke Crosbie		(substituted on) 65'
SH	22	George Horne		(substituted on) 50'
FB	23	Ollie Smith	(yellow card) 42'	(substituted on) 8'
Coach:
(Scotland) Gregor Townsend

Player of the Match:
Jamison Gibson-Park (Ireland)

Assistant referees:
Wayne Barnes (England)
Jordan Way (Australia)
Television match official:
Brett Cronan (Australia)

Notes:

- Peter O'Mahony became the tenth Irish rugby player to earn 100 test caps for his country.
- Blair Kinghorn (Scotland) earned his 50th test cap.

=== Tonga vs Romania ===
8 October 2023
17:45 CEST (UTC+2)

(1 BP) Tonga	45–24	Romania
Try: Kata (2) 11' c, 66' m Moala 15' c Taumoepeau 22' c Vailanu 49' c Ahki 62' c Taumoefolau 71' m Con: Havili (5/7) 13', 17', 23', 51', 63'	Report	Try: Boboc 30' c Surugiu 36' c Simionescu 55' c Con: Conache (3/3) 32', 37', 57'; Pen: Conache (1/2) 19'

Stade Pierre-Mauroy, Villeneuve-d'Ascq
Attendance: 45,042
Referee: Angus Gardner (Australia)

Tonga	Romania

FB	15	Salesi Piutau		(substituted off) 71'
RW	14	Solomone Kata		(substituted off) 67'
OC	13	George Moala
IC	12	Pita Ahki
LW	11	Afusipa Taumoepeau
FH	10	William Havili
SH	9	Sonatane Takulua (c)		(substituted off) 64'
N8	8	Sione Vailanu		(substituted off) 59'
OF	7	Sione Havili Talitui
BF	6	Semisi Paea
RL	5	Adam Coleman
LL	4	Leva Fifita	(yellow card) 32'	(substituted off) 72'
TP	3	Ben Tameifuna		(substituted off) 71'
HK	2	Paul Ngauamo		(substituted off) 75'
LP	1	Siegfried Fisiʻihoi		(substituted off) 72'
Replacements:
HK	16	Sione Angaʻaelangi		(substituted on) 75'
PR	17	Paula Latu		(substituted on) 72'
PR	18	Siate Tokolahi		(substituted on) 71'
LK	19	Sitiveni Mafi		(substituted on) 72'
FL	20	Penitoa Finau		(substituted on) 59'
SH	21	Manu Paea		(substituted on) 64'
FH	22	Patrick Pellegrini		(substituted on) 71'
WG	23	Kyren Taumoefolau		(substituted on) 67'
Coach:
(Australia) Toutai Kefu

FB	15	Marius Simionescu
RW	14	Nicolas Onuțu
OC	13	Tevita Manumua
IC	12	Fonovai Tangimana		(substituted off) 70'
LW	11	Taliaʻuli Sikuea		(substituted off) 64'
FH	10	Alin Conache	(yellow card) 70'
SH	9	Florin Surugiu		(substituted off) 52'
N8	8	André Gorin		(substituted off) 60'
OF	7	Cristi Boboc				(substituted off) 61'
BF	6	Florian Roșu		33' to 41'
RL	5	Marius Iftimiciuc
LL	4	Adrian Moțoc		(substituted off) 61'
TP	3	Alexandru Gordaș		(substituted off) 64'
HK	2	Ovidiu Cojocaru (c)		(substituted off) 59'
LP	1	Alexandru Savin		(substituted off) 60'
Replacements:
HK	16	Robert Irimescu		(substituted on) 59'
PR	17	Iulian Harțig		(substituted on) 60'
PR	18	Costel Burțilă		(substituted on) 64'
LK	19	Ștefan Iancu		(substituted on) 33'	(substituted off) 41'	(substituted on) 61'
FL	20	Damian Strătilă		(substituted on) 60'
SH	21	Gabriel Rupanu		(substituted on) 64'
CE	22	Alexandru Bucur		(substituted on) 52'
CE	23	Mihai Graure		(substituted on) 70'
Coach:
(Romania) Eugen Apjok

Player of the Match:
George Moala (Tonga)

Assistant referees:
Mathieu Raynal (France)
Christophe Ridley (England)
Television match official:
Ben Whitehouse (Wales)

Notes:

- This was the first ever meeting between these two sides at a World Cup.
- Vlad Neculau was originally named in the starting line-up for Romania, but withdrew prior to the match due to injury. He was replaced by Florian Roșu, whose place on the bench was taken by Ștefan Iancu.
- This was Tonga's largest points total in a World Cup match, surpassing the 35 points they scored against Namibia in 2015, and their biggest victory at the tournament (by margin), surpassing their 29–11 win over Ivory Coast in 1995.
- Romania finished the pool stage with 287 points and 43 tries conceded – the highest number of points and tries scored against one team in a single World Cup campaign, surpassing Namibia's concession of 266 points in 2011.
