= 2023 Rugby World Cup final =

Rugby competition in Paris, France

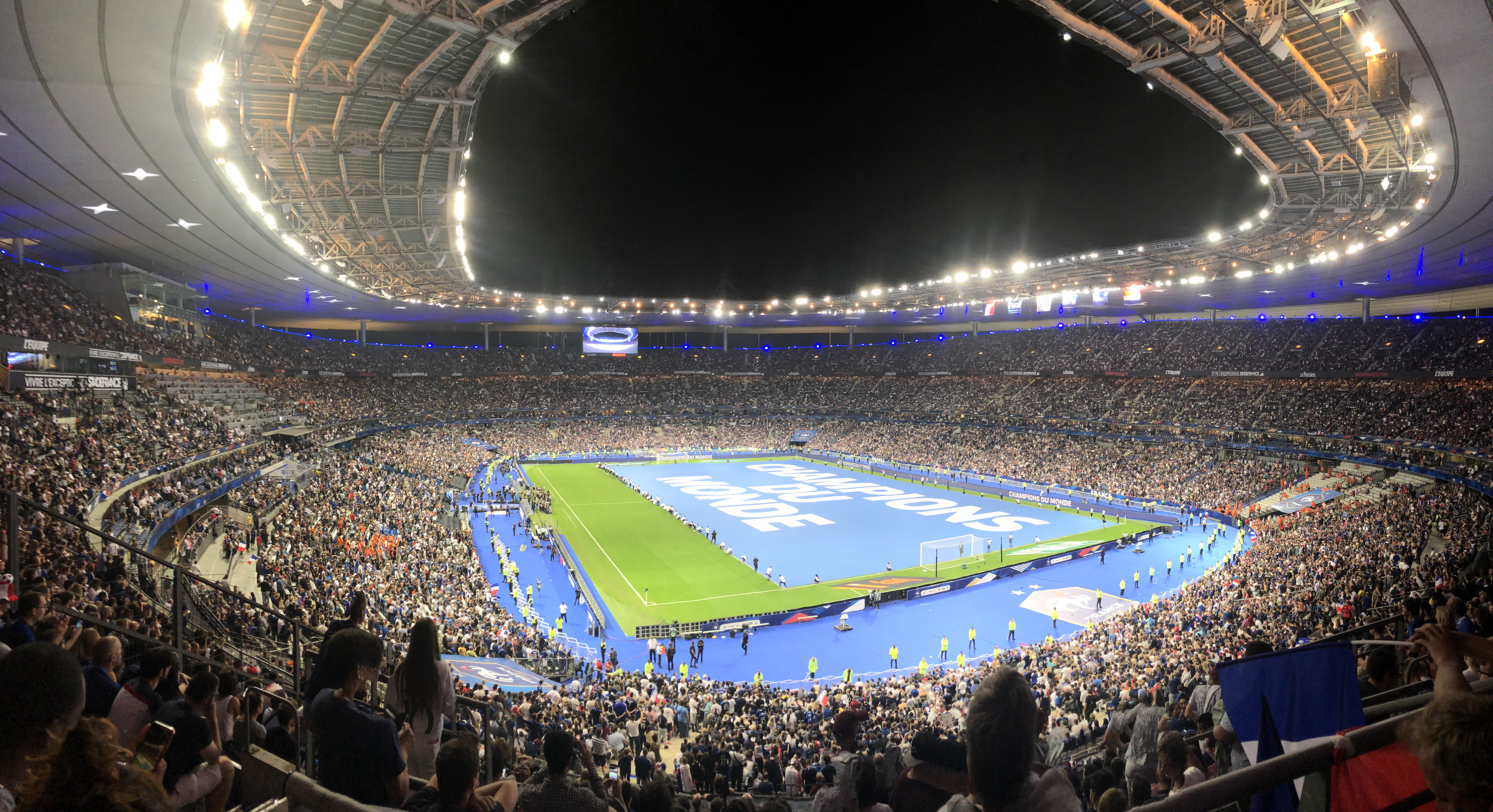
- Stade de France hosted the final
- Event: 2023 Rugby World Cup
New Zealand	South Africa
(New Zealand)	(South Africa)
11	12
- Date: 28 October 2023
- Venue: Stade de France, Saint-Denis
- Man of the Match: Pieter-Steph du Toit (South Africa)
- Referee: Wayne Barnes (England)
- Attendance: 80,065
- Weather: Cloudy; 15 °C (59 °F); 82% humidity

The 2023 Rugby World Cup final was a rugby union match played on 28 October 2023 at the Stade de France in Saint-Denis, France. It marked the culmination of the 2023 Rugby World Cup and was played between New Zealand and the defending champions, South Africa. This was the first time that both finalists had already lost a game during the tournament.

South Africa won the match by a single point, 12-11, becoming the first nation to win the Webb Ellis Cup four times. South Africa scored four penalties, and New Zealand scored a try and two penalties. New Zealand captain Sam Cane was sent off after 27 minutes, the first player to be red carded in a World Cup final.

== Route to the final ==
New Zealand
Round
South Africa
Pool A
Pool stage
Pool B
Opponent
Result
Opponent
Result
France
13–27
Match 1
Scotland
18–3
Namibia
71–3
Match 2
Romania
76–0
Italy
96–17
Match 3
Ireland
8–13
Uruguay
73–0
Match 4
Tonga
49–18

Pos	Team	Pld	W	D	L	PF	PA	TF	TA	B	Pts
1	France (H)	4	4	0	0	210	32	27	5	2	18
2	New Zealand	4	3	0	1	253	47	38	4	3	15
3	Italy	4	2	0	2	114	181	15	25	2	10
4	Uruguay	4	1	0	3	65	164	9	21	1	5
5	Namibia	4	0	0	4	37	255	3	37	0	0

Source: World Rugby
Rules for classification: Pool stage tiebreakers
(H) Host
Final standing

Pos	Team	Pld	W	D	L	PF	PA	TF	TA	B	Pts
1	Ireland	4	4	0	0	190	46	27	5	3	19
2	South Africa	4	3	0	1	151	34	22	4	3	15
3	Scotland	4	2	0	2	146	71	21	10	2	10
4	Tonga	4	1	0	3	96	177	13	25	1	5
5	Romania	4	0	0	4	32	287	4	43	0	0

Source: World Rugby
Rules for classification: Pool stage tiebreakers
Opponent
Result
Knockout stage
Opponent
Result
Ireland
28–24
Quarter-finals
France
29–28
Argentina
44–6
Semi-finals
England
16–15

=== New Zealand ===
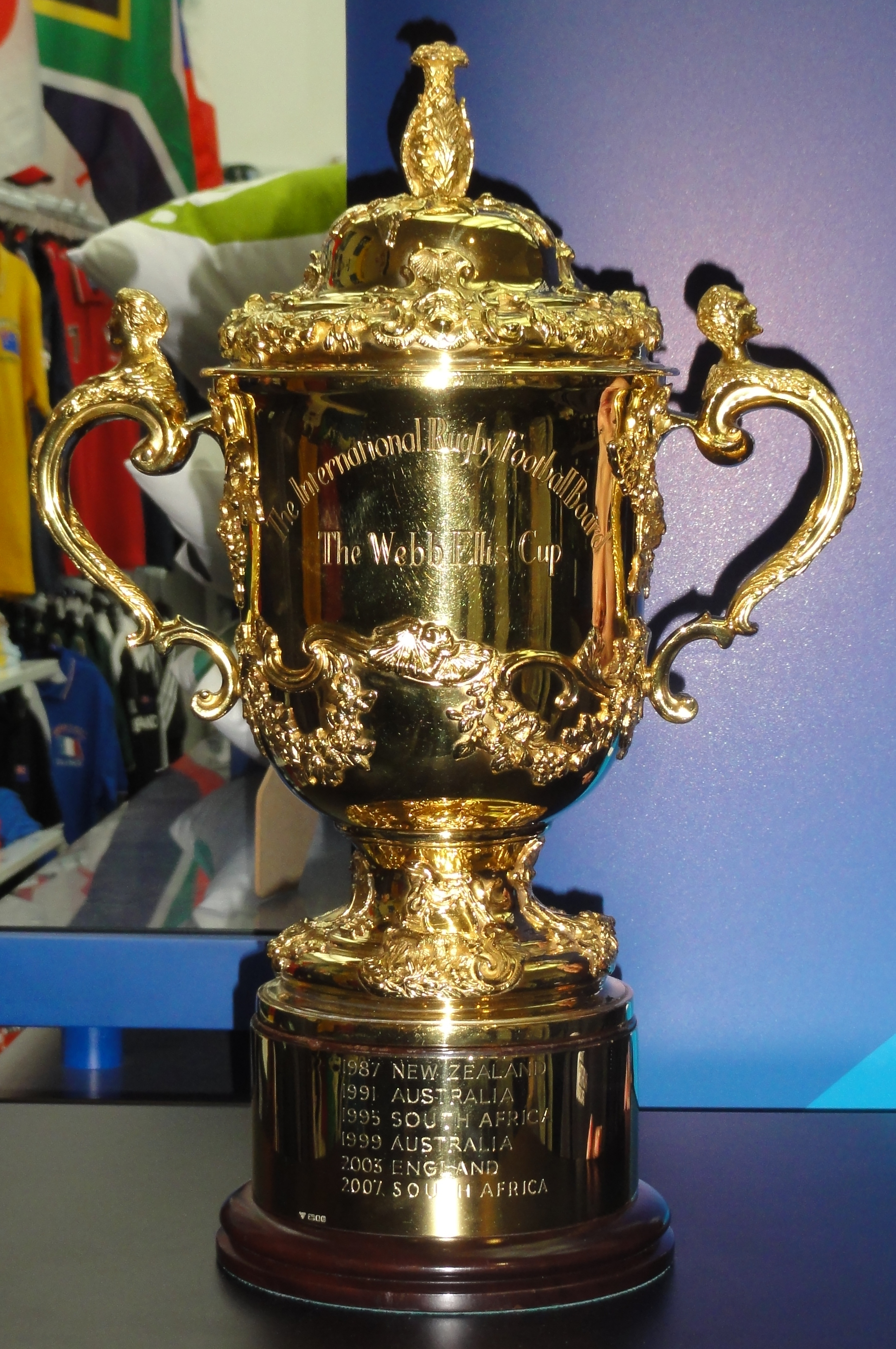
The winning team would receive the Webb Ellis Cup

New Zealand (also known as the All Blacks) began their World Cup campaign by losing to host nation France in the opening match of the tournament. They went on to win all their remaining pool matches by a considerable margin to qualify for the knockout stage. They beat Namibia by 71–3, Italy by 96–17, and Uruguay by 73–0. In the quarter-finals, New Zealand faced Ireland, who had won Pool B and were then ranked number one in the world. In a tight match, New Zealand won with a scoreline of 28–24. In the semi-final at the Stade de France, New Zealand played Argentina, whom they defeated 44–6 to reach their fifth Rugby World Cup final, a record ahead of Australia and England, who had both reached four finals. The All Blacks were also looking for a record fourth Rugby World Cup title, having won in 1987 followed by victories in 2011 and 2015.

=== South Africa ===
Defending champions South Africa (also known as the Springboks) reached their fourth Rugby World Cup final in a similar manner to New Zealand. In Pool B, the Springboks had lost to Ireland 13–8, but secured victories over Scotland, Romania, and Tonga to finish second in the pool and advance to the knockout stage. In the quarter-finals, they faced the hosts France, who had topped Pool A ahead of New Zealand. In a closely-contested match at the Stade de France, South Africa overcame their French counterparts with a 29–28 victory. In the semi-finals, South Africa played England in a repeat match-up of the 2007 and 2019 finals. In the match, played at the Stade de France, a late penalty scored by Handré Pollard gave South Africa victory by a single point (16–15) and allowed them to advance to their fourth Rugby World Cup final.

== Match ==
=== Summary ===
==== First half ====
In the second minute, New Zealand's Shannon Frizell received a yellow card for falling on top of the leg of Bongi Mbonambi. Mbonambi was forced off for the remainder of the match with a knee injury. South Africa went on to take a 6–0 lead with two penalties converted by Handré Pollard before Richie Mo'unga scored a penalty for New Zealand after 17 minutes. Pollard scored another penalty two minutes later to make it 9–3. In the 28th minute, New Zealand's captain Sam Cane was given a yellow card for a high shoulder tackle to the head of South Africa's Jesse Kriel which was later upgraded to a red card after a bunker review. Pollard scored another penalty in the 34th minute before Mo'unga replied with his second penalty to leave the score 12–6 to South Africa at half-time.

==== Second half ====
In the 45th minute, South African captain Siya Kolisi received a yellow card for a head high tackle on Ardie Savea which was also reviewed for a potential red card. On review, it remained a yellow card. In the 54th minute, New Zealand thought that they had scored a try. Aaron Smith went over the try line in the left corner; however, the TMO review showed that the ball had been knocked on by Ardie Savea before it was released from the initial lineout. They did get a try in the 58th minute. Beauden Barrett went over the try line on the left after an offload from Mark Tele'a. Richie Mo'unga missed the conversion from the left that would have put New Zealand in front. With 7 minutes to go, South Africa's Cheslin Kolbe received a yellow card for a deliberate knock on and Jordie Barrett missed the resultant penalty from 48 metres. South Africa held on to win 12–11 and claim their fourth World Cup title.

=== Details ===
28 October 2023
21:00 CEST (UTC+2)

New Zealand	11–12	South Africa
Try: B. Barrett 58' m Pen: Mo'unga (2/2) 17', 38'; J. Barrett (0/1) 73' m	Report	Pen: Pollard (4/4) 3', 13', 19', 34'

Stade de France, Saint-Denis
Attendance: 80,065
Referee: Wayne Barnes (England)

New Zealand	South Africa

FB	15	Beauden Barrett
RW	14	Will Jordan		(substituted off) 71'
OC	13	Rieko Ioane
IC	12	Jordie Barrett
LW	11	Mark Tele'a
FH	10	Richie Mo'unga		(substituted off) 75'
SH	9	Aaron Smith		(substituted off) 66'
N8	8	Ardie Savea
OF	7	Sam Cane (c)	(red card) 27'
BF	6	Shannon Frizell	(yellow card) 2'	(substituted off) 55'
RL	5	Scott Barrett
LL	4	Brodie Retallick		(substituted off) 71'
TP	3	Tyrel Lomax		(substituted off) 66'
HK	2	Codie Taylor		(substituted off) 66'
LP	1	Ethan de Groot		(substituted off) 66'
Replacements:
HK	16	Samisoni Taukei'aho		(substituted on) 66'
PR	17	Tamaiti Williams		(substituted on) 66'
PR	18	Nepo Laulala		(substituted on) 66'
LK	19	Sam Whitelock		(substituted on) 55'
FL	20	Dalton Papalii		(substituted on) 71'
SH	21	Finlay Christie		(substituted on) 66'
FB	22	Damian McKenzie		(substituted on) 75'
CE	23	Anton Lienert-Brown		(substituted on) 71'
Coach:
(New Zealand) Ian Foster

FB	15	Damian Willemse		(substituted off) 66'
RW	14	Kurt-Lee Arendse
OC	13	Jesse Kriel
IC	12	Damian de Allende
LW	11	Cheslin Kolbe	(yellow card) 73'
FH	10	Handré Pollard
SH	9	Faf de Klerk
N8	8	Duane Vermeulen		(substituted off) 58'
BF	7	Pieter-Steph du Toit
OF	6	Siya Kolisi (c)	(yellow card) 45'	(substituted off) 73'
RL	5	Franco Mostert		(substituted off) 52'
LL	4	Eben Etzebeth		(substituted off) 58'
TP	3	Frans Malherbe		(substituted off) 66'
HK	2	Bongi Mbonambi		(substituted off) 4'
LP	1	Steven Kitshoff		(substituted off) 52'
Replacements:
HK	16	Deon Fourie		(substituted on) 4'
PR	17	Ox Nché		(substituted on) 52'
PR	18	Trevor Nyakane		(substituted on) 66'
LK	19	Jean Kleyn		(substituted on) 58'
LK	20	RG Snyman		(substituted on) 52'
FL	21	Kwagga Smith		(substituted on) 58'
N8	22	Jasper Wiese		(substituted on) 73'
FB	23	Willie le Roux		(substituted on) 66'
Coach:
(South Africa) Jacques Nienaber

Player of the Match:
Pieter-Steph du Toit (South Africa)

Assistant referees:
Karl Dickson (England)
Matthew Carley (England)
Television match official:
Tom Foley (England)
Reserve official:
Luke Pearce (England)

Notes:

- South Africa became the first men's team to win a fourth World Cup title.
- South Africa became the first men's team to win successive World Cup titles away from home.
- South Africa became the second nation (after New Zealand women in 2002, 2006, 2010 and 2021, and New Zealand men in 2015) to retain the World Cup.
- This was the third time that the World Cup final winner earned their victory without scoring a try – a feat previously achieved by South Africa in 1995 and 2007.
- Sam Cane (New Zealand) became the first men's player to receive a red card in a World Cup final.
- The four cards issued in the match (one red and three yellows) set a new record for most cards issued in a World Cup final. There had been just one card issued across the previous nine finals – a yellow card against New Zealand's Ben Smith in 2015.
- This was the first World Cup final in which both finalists had lost a match during the pool stages.
- This was the first World Cup final in which all four match officials were appointed from the same union (England).
- Brothers Beauden Barrett, Jordie Barrett and Scott Barrett all started for New Zealand – the first time that three siblings played in a World Cup final.
- Beauden Barrett (New Zealand) became the first player to score a try in 2 separate Rugby World Cup finals, having scored a try in the 2015 RWC Final and another try in the 2023 RWC Final.

=== Statistics ===
Overall
	New Zealand	South Africa
Tries	1	0
Conversions	0	0
Penalties (attempts)	2(3)	4(4)
Drop goals (attempts)	0(0)	0(4)
Match stats
Territory	53%	47%
Possession	60%	40%
Attacking
Metres made	459	360
Offloads	5	7
Carries crossed gainline	66	37
Kicks from hand	34	38
Passes	221	84
Runs	149	85
Defending
Tackles	92	209
Tackles missed	14	37
Turnovers won	2	7
Rucks won	115	56
Mauls won	3	2
Set pieces
Scrums (won/lost)	(2/0)	(10/1)
Line-outs (won/lost)	(20/2)	(6/4)
Discipline
Yellow cards	1	2
Red cards	1	0
Penalties conceded	5	10

== See also ==
- History of rugby union matches between New Zealand and South Africa
