= Mack Hansen =

British Lions & Ireland international rugby union player (born 1998)

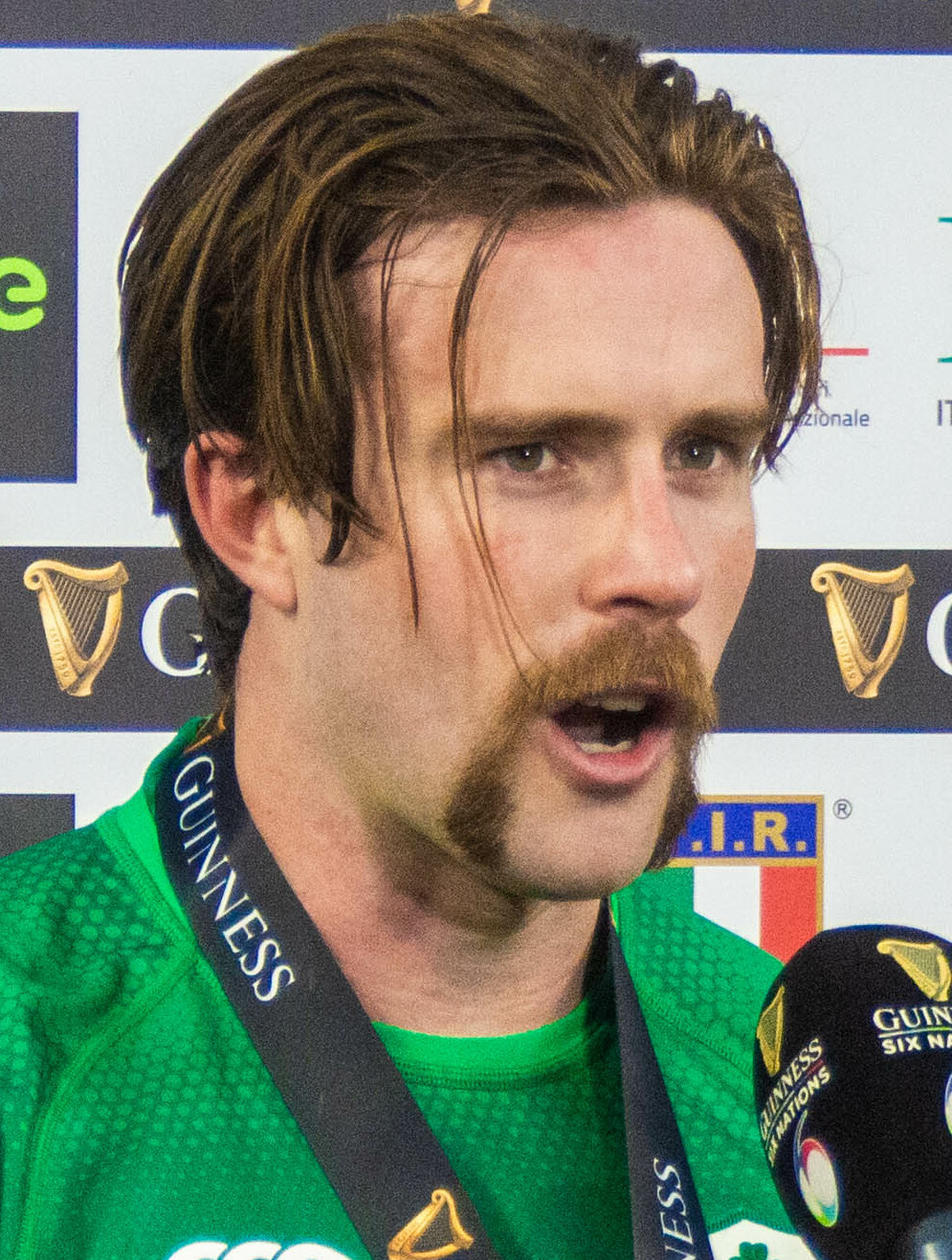
- Hansen representing Ireland during the 2023 Six Nations Championship
- Full name: Mackenzie Hansen
- Born: 27 March 1998 (age 28) Canberra, Australian Capital Territory, Australia
- Height: 1.88 m (6 ft 2 in)
- Weight: 89 kg (196 lb; 14 st 0 lb)
- School: Daramalan College

Rugby union career
- Position(s): Wing, Fullback
- Current team: Connacht
Senior career
Years	Team	Apps	(Points)
2017–2019	Canberra Vikings	16	(30)
2018–2021	Brumbies	21	(18)
2021–	Connacht	41	(65)
- Correct as of 9 July 2025
International career
Years	Team	Apps	(Points)
2018	Australia U20	5	(15)
2022–	Ireland	33	(75)
2025	British & Irish Lions	0	(0)
- Correct as of 21 November 2026

Mackenzie Hansen (born 27 March 1998) is a professional rugby union player who plays as a wing for United Rugby Championship club Connacht. Born in Australia, he represents Ireland at international level, qualifying through his Irish mother.

== Club career ==
After having played for the Brumbies in Super Rugby, he signed a two-year deal with Connacht ahead of the 2021–22 season.

In December 2024, Connacht lost 20–12 Leinster in the URC. Following the match, Hansen was critical of the officiating team suggesting referee Chris Busby and TMO Mark Patton had been inconsistent in the way they had reviewed incidents throughout the game and that this was part of a wider problem where Connacht never seemed to have any decisions go their way. In May 2025, he suffered an ankle injury and was ruled out for the rest of the season.

His injury continued into the latter part of 2025 and he underwent foot surgery in London in December 2025.

== International career ==
=== Australia U20 ===
Hansen appeared for Australia at the 2018 World Rugby Under 20 Championship.

=== Ireland ===
Hansen is eligible to represent Ireland through his Cork-born mother. Hansen was included in the Ireland squad for the 2022 Six Nations in January 2022.

He was selected in the starting XV for his debut, and impressed in Ireland's opening 29–7 victory against Wales on 5 February, earning the player of the match award. Hansen was nominated for the 2022 World Rugby Breakthrough Player of the Year. He was called up to the Ireland squad again for the 2023 Six Nations, helping secure a 34–20 victory over Italy with two tries in a player of the match performance in round 3. He scored another try and secured his third player-of-the-match performance in eight Six Nations matches in Ireland's 7–22 win over Scotland in round 4 of the 2023 Championship. He was once again awarded man of the match in Ireland's 29–10 win over England in their 2023 World Cup warm up match. In August 2023, he was selected to be part of Ireland's World Cup squad ahead of the 2023 World Cup in France. Hansen had to be taken off in Ireland's last Pool stage match against Scotland, after concerns that he was not going to play the quarterfinal against New Zealand, it was announced that he was in the Irish squad ahead of the game on 14 October. Ireland exited the World Cup in the Quarter Finals against the All-Blacks.

In November 2025, in his first game back from injury, he scored a hat-trick against Australia in 46–19 victory during the 2025 Autumn Nations Series. He underwent foot surgery in London in December 2025, missing the 2026 Six Nations.

=== British and Irish Lions ===
In May 2025, despite sustaining an ankle injury not long prior which would rule him for the rest of the league season, he was selected for the 2025 British & Irish Lions tour to Australia. In July 2025, he was selected for the matchday 23 against his former club the Brumbies. He went on to replace James Lowe in the second half, receiving a mixed reception from the crowd as the Lions went on to win 36–24. Unfortunately the winger sustained a foot injury playing in the tours final warm-up match against an AUNZ Invitational side, ruling him out of all three tests.

== Career statistics ==
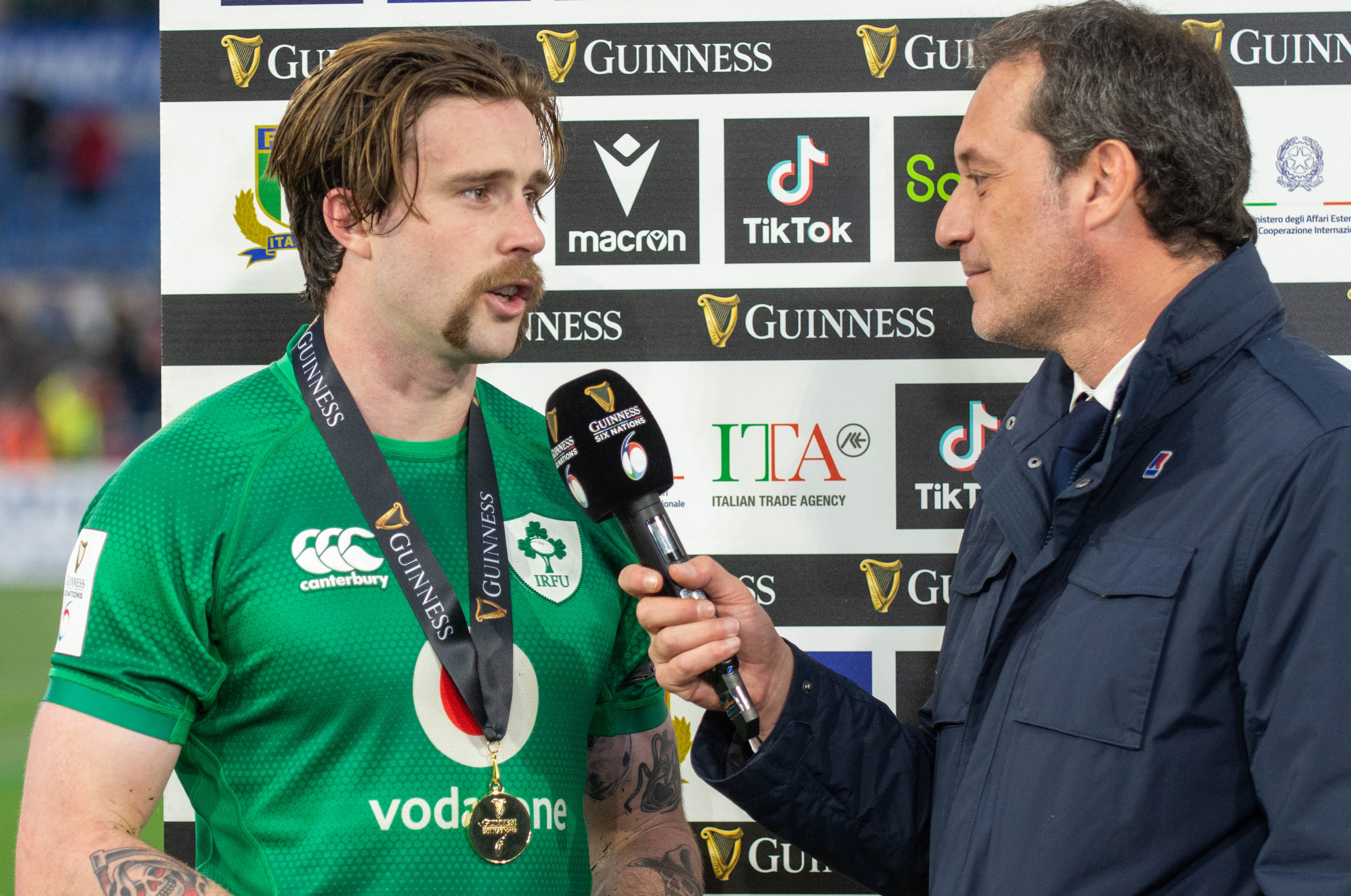
Hansen during player of the match interview following Ireland's win over Italy in the 2023 Six Nations.

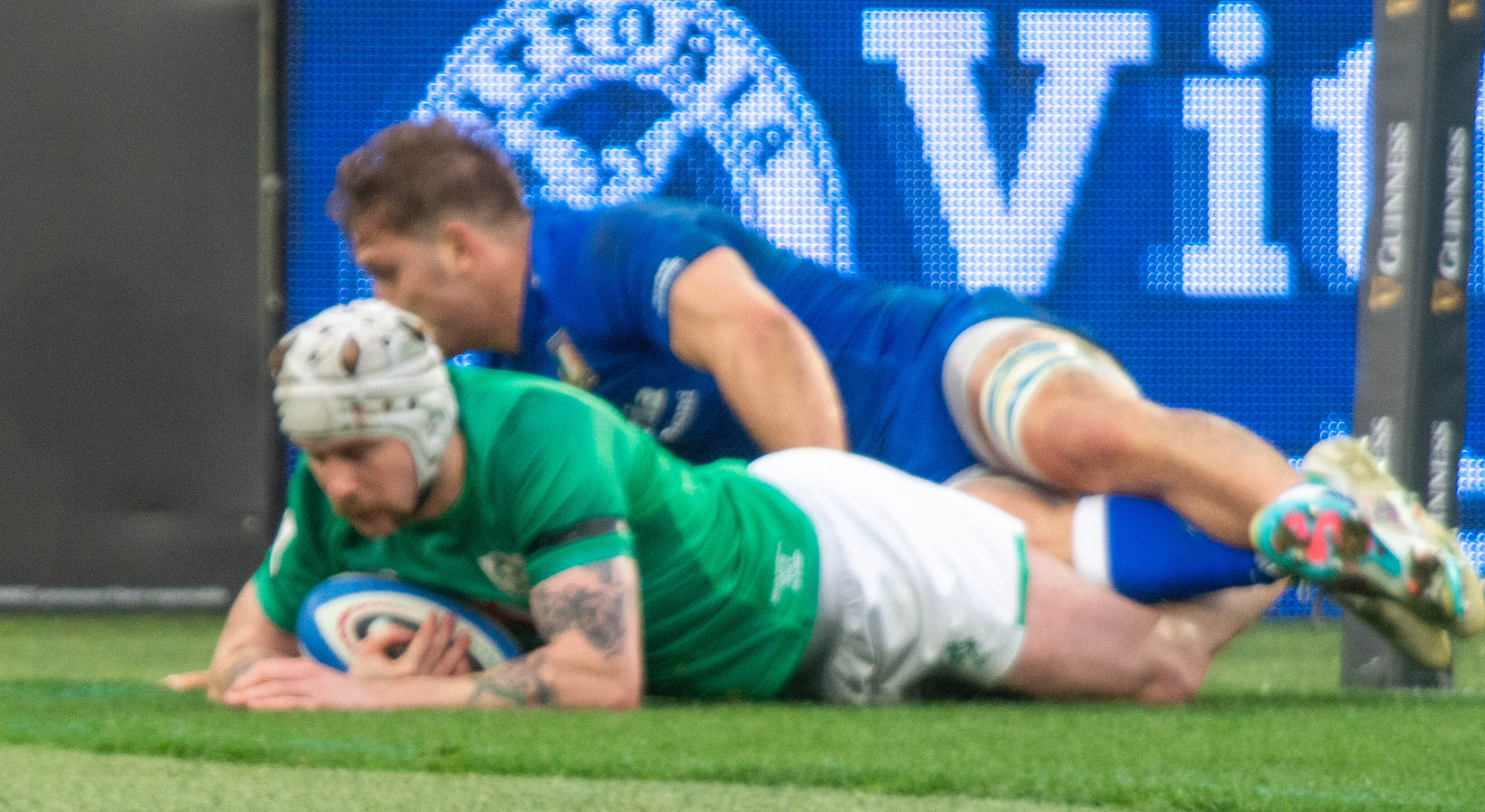
Hansen scores a try during the 2023 Six Nations.

=== List of international tries ===
Number	Position	Points	Tries	Result	Score	Opposition	Venue	Date	Ref.
1	Wing	5	1	Lost	24–30	France	Stade de France	12 February 2022	
2	Wing	5	1	Won	19–16	South Africa	Aviva Stadium	5 November 2022	
3	Wing	5	1	Won	35–17	Fiji	Aviva Stadium	12 November 2022	
4–5	Wing	10	2	Won	34–20	Italy	Stadio Olimpico	25 February 2023	
6	Wing	5	1	Won	22–7	Scotland	Murrayfield Stadium	12 March 2023	
7	Wing	5	1	Won	29–10	England	Aviva Stadium	19 August 2023	
8	Wing	5	1	Won	59–16	Tonga	Stade de la Beaujoire	17 September 2023	
9	Wing	5	1	Won	13–8	South Africa	Stade de France	23 September 2023	
10	Wing	5	1	Won	22–19	Argentina	Aviva Stadium	15 November 2024	
11–12	Wing	10	2	Won	52–17	Fiji	Aviva Stadium	23 November 2024	
13–15	Fullback	15	3	Won	46–19	Australia	Aviva Stadium	15 November 2025	

as of 15 November 2025

== Honours ==
Ireland

- 3× Triple Crown: 2022, 2023, 2025
- 2× Six Nations Championship: 2023, 2024
- 1× Grand Slam: 2023
