= Deon Fourie =

South African rugby union player

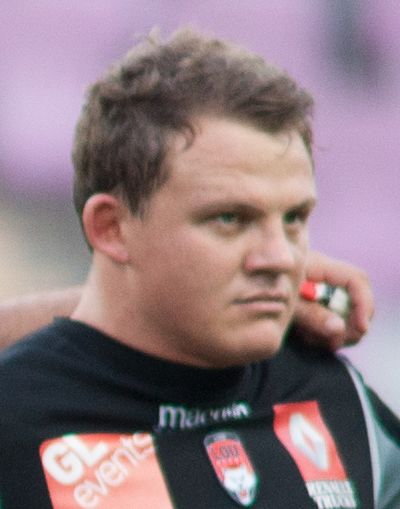
- Fourie in 2014
- Full name: Deon André Fourie
- Born: 25 September 1986 (age 40) Pretoria, South Africa
- Height: 1.76 m (5 ft 9 1/2 in)
- Weight: 96 kg (15 st 2 lb; 212 lb)
- School: Pietersburg High School

Rugby union career
- Position: Hooker / Loose forward
- Current team: Stormers / Western Province
Youth career
- 2004: Limpopo Blue Bulls
- 2005–2007: Western Province
Senior career
Years	Team	Apps	(Points)
2006–2014	Western Province	90	(110)
2008–2014	Stormers	84	(65)
2014–2019	Lyon	93	(70)
2019–2021	Grenoble	43	(55)
2021–	Western Province	10	(5)
2021–	Stormers	32	(40)
- Correct as of 1 November 2023
International career
Years	Team	Apps	(Points)
2007	South Africa Sevens	3	
2022–	South Africa	16	(10)
- Correct as of 27 September 2026
Medal record
Men's Rugby union
Representing South Africa
Rugby World Cup
Gold medal – first place	2023 France	Squad

Deon André Fourie (born 25 September 1986) is a South African professional rugby union player who plays for Western Province in the South African Provincial Currie Cup competition and for the Stormers in the United Rugby Championship. His regular playing positions are Hooker and Loose forward. He is known for his work rate and power at the rucks. He made history as the oldest Springbok debutant and became part of the squad that won the 2023 Rugby World Cup in France, playing 76 minutes in the final, which South Africa won.

Fourie previously played for the Western Province provincial team and the Stormers Super Rugby team. Fourie captained Western Province to Currie Cup champions in 2012. He represented South Africa at 7s level internationally in 2007.

Fourie’s natural athletic ability was evident from a young age where he won two South African gymnastics titles while under the tutelage of his mother, Jeanette Fourie. He has attributed this early gymnastics training as one of the reasons he has been so successful as a fetcher in rugby union.

In April 2013, Fourie signed a deal that would have kept him in Cape Town until 2015. However, he gained an early release from the contract to join French Top 14 side Lyon prior to the 2014–15 Top 14 season.

== Honours ==
- 2012 Currie Cup - Winner
- 2022 United Rugby Championship - Winner
- 2023 Rugby World Cup - Winner

== Statistics ==
=== Test match record ===
As of 13 September 2026

Opponent	P	W	D	L	Try	Pts	%Won
Argentina	2	2	0	0	0	0	100
Australia	2	2	0	0	0	0	100
England	1	1	0	0	0	0	100
France	2	1	0	1	0	0	50
Ireland	2	0	0	2	0	0	0
New Zealand	4	4	0	0	0	0	100
Romania	1	1	0	0	1	5	100
Tonga	1	1	0	0	1	5	100
Wales	1	0	0	1	0	0	0
Total	16	12	0	4	2	10	75

=== International tries ===
As of 24 May 2025

Try	Opposing team	Location	Venue	Competition	Date	Result	Score
1	Romania	Bordeaux, France	Nouveau Stade de Bordeaux	2023 Rugby World Cup	17 September 2023	Win	76–0
2	Tonga	Marseille, France	Stade Vélodrome	2023 Rugby World Cup	1 October 2023	Win	49–18
