= Damian Willemse =

South African rugby union player (born 1998)

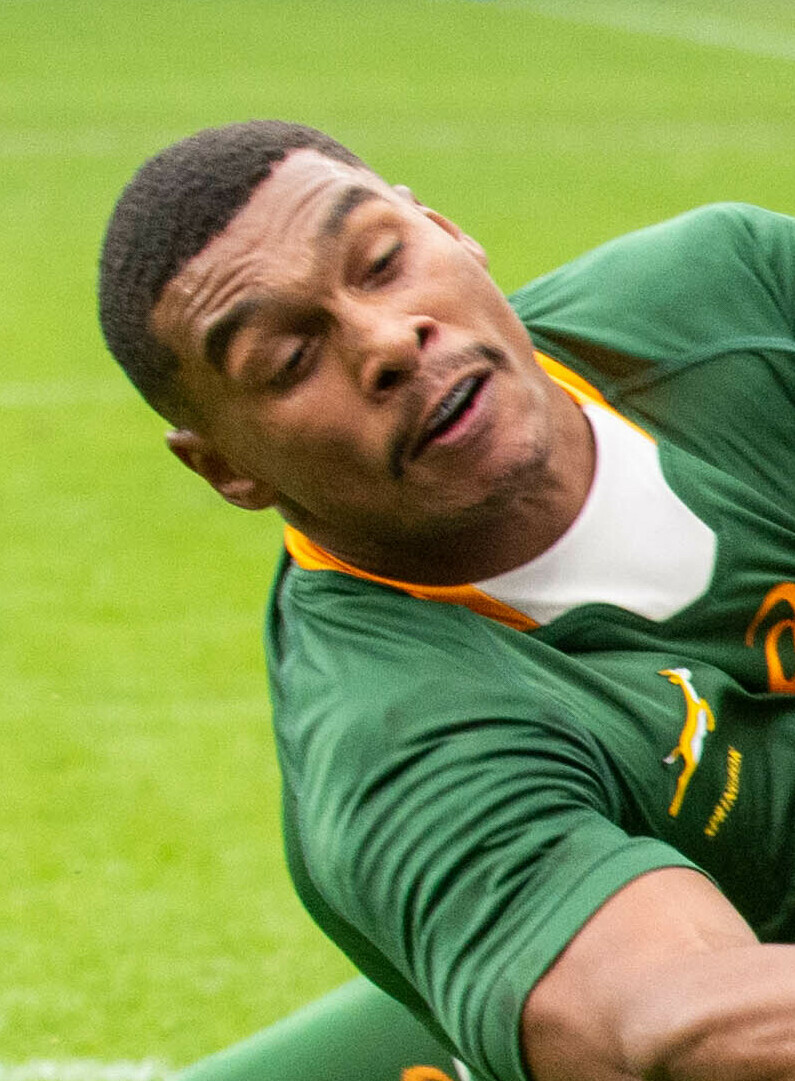
- Willemse playing for South Africa in 2022
- Born: 7 May 1998 (age 28) Strand, Western Cape, South Africa
- Height: 1.85 m (6 ft 1 in)
- Weight: 94 kg (207 lb; 14 st 11 lb)
- School: Paul Roos Gymnasium, Stellenbosch
- Notable relative: Ramone Samuels (brother)
- Occupation: Professional rugby player

Rugby union career
- Position: Fly-half / Fullback / Inside Centre
- Current team: Stormers / Western Province
Youth career
- 2014–2019: Western Province
Senior career
Years	Team	Apps	(Points)
2017–	Stormers	121	(339)
2017–	Western Province	25	(54)
2019	→ Saracens (loan)	3	(5)
- Correct as of 31 October 2026
International career
Years	Team	Apps	(Points)
2015–2016	South Africa Schools	5	(5)
2017–2018	South Africa U20	7	(15)
2018–present	South Africa	54	(78)
- Correct as of 12 September 2026
Medal record
Men's Rugby union
Representing South Africa
Rugby World Cup
Gold medal – first place	2019 Japan	Squad
Gold medal – first place	2023 France	Squad
Boy's rugby sevens
Commonwealth Youth Games
Gold medal – first place	2015 Apia	Team competition

Damian Willemse (born 7 May 1998) is a South African professional rugby union player who represents the South Africa internationally and plays domestically for the Stormers in the United Rugby Championship and Western Province in the Currie Cup. Primarily a fullback, he is noted for his versatility and has also regularly featured at fly-half and inside centre. Willemse was a member of South Africa's 2019 Rugby World Cup and 2023 Rugby World Cup winning squads, becoming the youngest player to win the tournament twice.

== Early life ==
Willemse was born in Strand to Francois (“Fanie”) Willemse and Charlotte Willemse (née Samuels). He grew up alongside his brother Ramone Samuels, who took their mother’s surname.

Willemse attended Somerset West Methodist Primary School, where his rugby union talent was identified and nurtured by his influential teacher and coach, Winston Baard. He later enrolled at Paul Roos Gymnasium in Stellenbosch, one of South Africa’s leading rugby union schools, where he continued his development.

=== Schoolboy rugby ===
In 2014, Willemse was selected to represent Western Province at the Under-16 Grant Khomo Week in Pretoria. He started all three matches, helping his side achieve an unbeaten tournament, including scoring a try in Western Province's 26–11 victory over hosts the Blue Bulls in the final match.

Willemse progressed to the Western Province Under-18 squad for the 2015 Craven Week, South Africa's premier schoolboy rugby union tournament. He again started all three matches, scoring tries in a 65–5 win over the Griffons and in the unofficial final, a dominant 95–0 victory over Eastern Province. His performances earned him selection for the South Africa Schools side for the 2015 Under-18 International Series. He featured in victories over Wales and France, and was an unused replacement against England as South Africa completed a series clean sweep.

In 2016, Willemse was again selected for Western Province for the Craven Week tournament in Durban, starting all three matches and scoring two tries in their opening game against Boland. He helped Western Province to a 27–20 victory over the Golden Lions in the final match of the week. Willemse earned a second call-up to the South Africa Schools team, starting all three matches at fly-half. South Africa again finished the series unbeaten, including wins over Wales, France Under-19—where Willemse scored a try—and England.

== Club career ==
Willemse signed with the DHL Stormers while completing his matric year at Paul Roos Gymnasium, with Business Day describing him as “the undisputed schoolboy star of 2016” ahead of his rapid elevation to Super Rugby. He joined the senior squad for pre-season training immediately after writing his matric exams.

While still at school, Willemse also appeared for the Western Province U19 team in the 2016 Under-19 Provincial Championship. He featured as a replacement in three of their final four regular-season matches, scoring a try on debut at this level against the Sharks U19s, and kicking conversions in matches against the Leopards U19s and the Blue Bulls U19s. His contributions helped Western Province finish top of the log heading into the play-offs.

He was promoted to the starting line-up for their 30–15 semi-final victory over Free State U19, and also started the final, where Western Province lost 19–60 to the Golden Lions U19s.

=== 2017-19: Stormers and Western Province ===
Only months after finishing school, Willemse was included in the Stormers squad for the 2017 Super Rugby season.

He was included in a matchday squad for their Round Three match against the Southern Kings on 4 March, and he made his Super Rugby debut – aged just 18 years, 301 days – by coming on in the 78th minute of the match. By July of that year, Willemse was already being described as a "top talent" with his acceleration, evasive ability and confidence in taking on the defensive line being praised.

Willemse made his Currie Cup debut for Western Province during the 2017 Currie Cup Premier Division, quickly establishing himself as a key member of the squad. On 1 October 2017, he kicked a decisive late penalty to secure a 46–45 victory over the Blue Bulls at Loftus Versfeld. Later that month, he started at fullback in the Currie Cup Final, contributing an off-load in the lead-up to a try as Western Province defeated the Sharks 33–21 to claim the title.

During the 2018 Super Rugby season, Willemse produced several notable performances. In Round One he contributed to a 28–20 Stormers win, successfully adding points from the tee and playing a central role in the backline. He later recorded four conversions and two penalties in a 37–20 victory over the Blues on 17 March 2018.

In the 2018 Currie Cup, Willemse continued to feature prominently for Western Province – starting matches at both fullback and inside centre. He was selected at fullback for a key fixture in September as part of his positional development and preparation for higher honours. Ahead of the 2018 Currie Cup Final, he was shifted to inside centre as Western Province sought to maximise his attacking influence. Western Province went on to lose the final 12–17 to the Sharks at Newlands.

In the 2019 Super Rugby season, Willemse continued to feature regularly for the franchise, operating at both fly-half and fullback. He played prominently in the Stormers’ fixture against the Blues in Auckland on 30 March 2019, contributing on attack and defence in a close contest. Willemse's 2019 Super Rugby season was cut short after he suffered a knee injury in a match against the Lions in June, forcing him out of action for approximately two months. The injury ruled him out of the closing stages of the Stormers’ campaign and delayed his return to domestic rugby until the latter rounds of the 2019 Currie Cup.

After recovering, Willemse returned to Currie Cup action with Western Province preparing to use him as a central figure in their backline for the remainder of the competition. His return was seen as an important late-season boost, and he was selected in Western Province's final two games of the season against Griquas and the Cheetahs.

=== 2019: Saracens ===
In September 2019, Willemse signed for Premiership club Saracens on a three-month deal to provide injury cover for Alex Goode and Max Malins. He made his debut for the club in the Premiership Cup against Wasps, providing a try assist in the second half.

During his loan spell, he made two Premiership Cup appearances, playing against Wasps and the Sale Sharks, before being called into South Africa's squad for the 2019 Rugby World Cup. After the tournament he featured once more for Saracens, appearing in the European Rugby Champions Cup against Racing 92, before his loan ended and he returned to the Stormers.

=== 2019-2021: Return to the Stormers and Western Province ===
Willemse began the 2020 Super Rugby season strongly, starting at fly-half for the Stormers. In the opening round on 2 February 2020, he scored an intercept try in a 27–0 victory over the Hurricanes at Newlands, contributing to a dominant defensive and attacking performance by the side. Willemse continued as the Stormers’ first-choice fly-half through the early rounds of the competition. His campaign was cut short in Round 7, when he sustained an injury while at fullback during the Stormers’ loss to the Sharks on 14 March 2020—the final match played before the season was suspended and later cancelled due to the COVID-19 pandemic.

When domestic rugby resumed later in the year under the Super Rugby Unlocked competition, Willemse returned to the Stormers’ starting lineup and shifted primarily between fly-half and fullback. He delivered a composed display in the Stormers’ 23–17 win over the Lions at Newlands, earning praise for his improved game management in directing the backline. One of his strongest performances came in a 30–13 victory over the Free State Cheetahs, where he contributed 15 points through two penalties, three conversions and a drop-goal, along with an off-load in the build-up to a try.

During the 2020-21 Currie Cup, Willemse featured regularly for Western Province, splitting his time between fly-half and fullback. Early-season analysis noted his assured performances in the backfield, highlighting his improved positional play, counter-attacking carries and reliability under the high ball as Province built momentum through the opening rounds of the competition. His form strengthened further after he committed his long-term future to the union, producing one of his most composed outings of the campaign in a match against the Bulls, where he contributed several well-judged kicks from hand and carried strongly on attack as Province pushed for territory and continuity.

During the 2021 Rainbow Cup SA, as South African teams began their transition toward joining the northern hemisphere's Pro14 structure, Willemse featured regularly for the Stormers at fullback. He played in the side's 25–22 victory over the Sharks in Durban on 22 May 2021, where he helped create one of the Stormers’ tries during a strong counter-attacking performance. The Stormers struggled in the tournament, winning only 2 games.

=== 2021-2023: URC success ===
During the inaugural 2021–22 United Rugby Championship season, Willemse featured prominently in the Stormers’ title-winning campaign.

In April 2022, he played a decisive role in a key late-season derby victory over the Bulls in Cape Town. Willemse landed a 70th-minute drop goal that stretched the Stormers’ lead during a tight contest, with the official match report describing it as “a vital drop goal ... to push their lead to nine points” in a 19–17 win.

Willemse returned from injury for the semi-final on 11 June 2022 against Ulster, where he delivered one of his standout displays of the season. Despite carrying a heavily strapped arm, he produced an “outstanding” all-round performance with “serious metres” made on attack, earning the Man of the Match award. Head coach John Dobson highlighted Willemse's influence and commitment, noting that “if anybody oozes blue and white in their veins, bleeds blue and white, it's Damian Willemse,” after Willemse returned to play despite initial assessments following his quarter-final injury against Edinburgh suggesting he would miss the remainder of the season.

A week later, in June 2022, Willemse helped the Stormers defeat the Bulls 18–13 in the URC final in Cape Town, securing the franchise's first title of the competition. Post-match analysis praised Willemse’s maturity and impact in the decider, noting that the 24-year-old had “come of age” and was a “key figure” in the Stormers’ championship performance.

In October 2022, Willemse signed a new five-year contract with the Stormers, extending his stay at the franchise until at least 2027. As part of the broader agreement, he also entered into a commercial partnership with Ardagh Africa (formerly Consol Glass), undertaking public brand ambassador duties in support of the company’s social sustainability programmes. Media estimates placed the combined value of the Stormers contract and associated commercial arrangements at approximately R10 million per year.

During the 2022-23 URC campaign, Willemse again featured consistently for the Stormers as the team built on their inaugural United Rugby Championship success. He played in 11 games and alternated between inside centre and fullback throughout the season. He was described by the coaching staff as an important squad figure, with reports in early 2023 noting that he was “raring to go” ahead of the season's decisive stages following a short injury lay-off.

Willemse delivered several notable performances in the Champions Cup. On 1 April 2023, he scored an acrobatic try from fullback in the Stormers’ round-of-16 victory over Harlequins, with commentators describing the finish as “mind-blowing” as the Stormers progressed to the quarter-finals. He scored again a week later in the quarter-final against Exeter Chiefs, although the Stormers were defeated and eliminated from the competition.

In the URC, Willemse began to feature more regularly at fullback as the season concluded. His performances across the season contributed to the Stormers qualifying for a second consecutive URC final. Willemse started the 2023 URC final at fullback, although the Stormers were defeated 19–14 by Munster in Cape Town.

=== 2023-Present ===
Willemse made his first appearance of the 2023–24 United Rugby Championship season in December 2023, starting at inside centre in the Stormers’ 31–7 victory over Zebre Parma in Stellenbosch. He also started later that month in the Stormers’ derby win over the Sharks, contributing in midfield as the team closed out their 2023 calendar year with a 16–15 victory.

Willemse also featured for the Stormers in the Champions Cup, making four appearances as the team reached the Round of 16 before being eliminated by La Rochelle at DHL Stadium. His URC campaign ultimately consisted of 11 games and was cut short in May 2024 when he sustained a serious finger injury in the final round of the regular season against Connacht. The injury ruled him out for approximately four months and ended his participation in the remainder of the Stormers’ campaign. The Stormers were eliminated in the URC quarter-finals by eventual champions Glasgow Warriors.

Willemse did not feature in the Stormers’ Champions Cup campaign during the 2024–25 season, with his appearances limited to the United Rugby Championship. He produced one of his strongest early-season showings in October 2024 against Munster, contributing 14 points — including a late drop goal — in a 34–19 victory that ended the Stormers’ long winless run against the Irish club.

Later that month, Willemse sustained a groin injury after scoring a try in the first half of the Stormers’ URC fixture against Glasgow Warriors, an issue described by head coach John Dobson as a “massive blow” to the team's early-season plans. The injury sidelined him for several months. He returned only in March 2025 for an away win over the Scarlets, marking his first appearance since the injury lay-off. During this period he also received a yellow card in the Stormers’ league match against Benetton.

Willemse's final appearance of the season came against Cardiff Rugby in May 2025. His subsequent suspension for a red card in that game ruled him out of the knockout rounds, and he missed the Stormers’ URC quarter-final, where the team were again eliminated by Glasgow Warriors.

== International career ==
Damian Willemse made his international debut for South Africa in the 2018 Rugby Championship against Argentina at Kings Park Stadium in a 34–21 victory, coming off the bench to replace André Esterhuizen.

Willemse was not initially named in South Africa's squad for the 2019 Rugby World Cup. However, he was called up to replace the injured Jesse Kriel during the pool stage. He scored his first Test try against Canada, and South Africa went on to win the tournament, defeating England in the final.

Willemse featured in all three Tests of the 2021 British & Irish Lions series for South Africa, appearing off the bench in the 66th, 67th and 68th minutes respectively. South Africa won the series 2–1.

In July 2022, Willemse kicked a match-winning penalty after the hooter to seal a 32–29 victory over Wales at Loftus Versfeld, a moment widely noted for his composure under pressure. Later in the year he started at fly-half against England at Twickenham during the Springboks’ end-of-year tour, contributing two drop-goals in a 27–13 victory.

Willemse was a key member of South Africa's squad at the 2023 Rugby World Cup, playing primarily at fullback throughout the tournament. He featured in several pool and knockout matches, including the final, as South Africa secured a record fourth world title, and he became the youngest double Rugby World Cup winner.

In September 2025, Willemse produced one of the standout performances of his Test career in South Africa's 43–10 victory over New Zealand in Wellington, scoring a try and receiving a 10/10 player rating from several analysts.

He also starred in the November internationals of that year, delivering a man-of-the-match performance in the 32–14 win over Italy in Turin. He additionally featured in South Africa's Test against France earlier in the same tour, which they won.

=== Test Match record ===
As of 15 November 2026

Against	P	W	D	L	Tri	Pts	%Won
Argentina	9	8	0	1	0	5	88.89
Australia	6	2	0	4	0	2	33.33
British & Irish Lions	3	2	0	1	0	0	66.67
Canada	1	1	0	0	1	5	100
England	4	3	0	1	0	6	66.67
France	4	2	0	2	0	3	50
Georgia	2	2	0	0	1	5	100
Ireland	3	1	0	2	1	8	33.33
Italy	4	4	0	0	2	10	100
New Zealand	10	6	0	4	1	5	60
Romania	1	1	0	0	1	15	100
Scotland	2	2	0	0	1	5	100
Wales	8	6	0	2	1	12	75
Total	57	40	0	17	9	81	70.18

Pld = Games Played, W = Games Won, D = Games Drawn, L = Games Lost, Tri = Tries Scored, Pts = Points Scored

=== Test tries (9) ===
Try	Opposition	Location	Venue	Competition	Date	Result	Score
1	Canada	Kobe, Japan	Kobe Misaki Stadium	2019 Rugby World Cup	8 October 2019	Win	66–7
2	Italy	Genoa, Italy	Stadio Luigi Ferraris	2022 end-of-year test	19 November 2022	Win	21–63
3	Wales	Cardiff, Wales	Millennium Stadium	2023 Rugby World Cup warm-up match	19 August 2023	Win	16–52
4	Romania	Bordeaux, France	Nouveau Stade de Bordeaux	2023 Rugby World Cup Pool B match	17 September 2023	Win	76–0
5	Georgia	Mbombela, South Africa	Mbombela Stadium	2025 mid-year tests	19 July 2025	Win	55–10
6	New Zealand	Wellington, New Zealand	Wellington Regional Stadium	2025 Rugby Championship	13 September 2025	Win	10–43
7	Ireland	Dublin, Ireland	Aviva Stadium	2025 end-of-year test	22 November 2025	Win	13–24
8	Scotland	Pretoria, South Africa	Loftus Versfeld Stadium	2026 Nations Championship	11 July 2026	Win	42–28
9	Italy	Turin, Italy	Juventus Stadium	2026 Nations Championship	7 November 2026	Win	7–66

== Personal life, philanthropy and activism ==
Willemse grew up in Strand, Western Cape, a coastal town on the outskirts of Cape Town. The area was significantly shaped by apartheid-era spatial planning policies, which displaced Black and Coloured communities and contributed to longstanding socio-economic challenges, including high unemployment and increased exposure to crime and gangsterism. Willemse has spoken about these conditions as part of his motivation for community involvement, and he has participated in local environmental and social initiatives in Strand. These have included beach clean-up campaigns and projects to plant trees in the area, with reports indicating that more than 500 trees were planted as part of these efforts.

Through partnerships with organisations such as One Tree Planted and sponsors including Vida e Caffè and Adidas, Willemse has contributed to reforestation and environmental awareness initiatives in South Africa. He has also supported global climate-focused campaigns, and alongside teammate Siya Kolisi serves as an ambassador for Adidas’ Run for the Oceans programme.

Willemse is the younger brother of Ramone Samuels, also a professional rugby union player. Both brothers were members of the Western Province squad that won the 2017 Currie Cup Premier Division.

== Honours ==
South Africa

- Rugby World Cup:
  - Winner: 2019, 2023
- British & Irish Lions series:
  - Winner: 2021
- The Rugby Championship:
  - Winner: 2025

Stormers

- United Rugby Championship:
  - Winner: 2021–22
  - Runner-up: 2022–23

Western Province

- Currie Cup:
  - Winner: 2017
