= Niall Bailey =

Irish rugby union player

- Full name: Niall Patrick Joseph Bailey
- Born: 20 March 1929 Dublin, Ireland
- Died: 17 August 2019 (aged 90) Warwick, England

Rugby union career
- Position: Wing three-quarter
International career
Years	Team	Apps	(Points)
1952	Ireland	1	(0)

Niall Patrick Joseph Bailey (20 March 1929 — 17 August 2019) was an Irish international rugby union player.

Born in Dublin, Bailey was a nephew of Ireland centre Aidan Bailey and attended Presentation College, Bray.

Bailey, a wing three-quarter, played his rugby in England, where he moved aged 18. He first competed with Northampton, scoring 74 tries from 156 appearances, then for Warwickshire clubs Coventry and Kenilworth. In 1952, Bailey was capped for Ireland in a Five Nations match against England at Twickenham, used on the right wing.

Bailey ran a building company in Warwickshire, acquired by Grafton Group in 1999 for £13.5 million.

== See also ==
- List of Ireland national rugby union players
