= Willie le Roux =

South African rugby union player

- Le Roux with the Bulls in 2026
- Full name: Willem Jacobus le Roux
- Born: 18 August 1989 (age 37) Stellenbosch, Cape Province, South Africa
- Height: 1.85 m (6 ft 1 in)
- Weight: 90 kg (198 lb; 14 st 2 lb)
- School: Paul Roos Gymnasium

Rugby union career
- Position(s): Fullback, Wing, Fly-half
- Current team: Bulls
Youth career
- 2007: Western Province
- 2008-2009: Boland Cavaliers
Senior career
Years	Team	Apps	(Points)
2010–2011	Boland Cavaliers	39	(87)
2012–2015	Cheetahs	58	(90)
2012–2013	Griquas	11	(5)
2015–2017	Yokohama Canon Eagles	18	(35)
2016	Sharks	13	(15)
2017–2019	Wasps	57	(65)
2019–2023	Toyota Verblitz	38	(44)
2023–	Bulls	65	(78)
- Correct as of 31 October 2026
International career
Years	Team	Apps	(Points)
2013–	South Africa	101	(75)
2014–2015	Springbok XV (Note: In 2014 and 2015, the South African national team played non-test internationals against a World XV in Cape Town.)	2	(20)
- Correct as of 6 September 2025
Medal record
Men's rugby union
Representing South Africa
Rugby World Cup
Bronze medal – third place	2015 England	Squad
Gold medal – first place	2019 Japan	Squad
Gold medal – first place	2023 France	Squad

Willem Jacobus le Roux (born 18 August 1989) is a South African professional rugby union player. He is a versatile back-line player who generally plays as a fullback or wing, though earlier in his career he played mostly as a fly-half. He currently plays for the for the Bulls in the United Rugby Championship (URC). He renowned for his vision, try assisting and ability under the high ball, and is widely regarded as one of the best fullbacks of his generation.

== Career ==
Le Roux was born and raised in the Western Cape and he started his professional career with Boland Cavaliers. He spent 2 years with the Cavaliers, helping them to lift the 2011 Currie Cup First Division title in his final appearance. He moved north to join the Griquas along with several of his Boland team-mates in 2012 and started 9 of the Peacock Blues 10 games during his debut season in Kimberley. After a rocky start in which he was sin-binned for a dangerous tackle on Blue Bulls full-back Jurgen Visser and subsequently suspended for Griquas' second match of the season, Le Roux established himself as one of the top players in South African domestic rugby.

Upon moving to the Griquas in 2012, Le Roux was instantly called up to the Cheetahs Super Rugby squad. He made his debut in Week 1 of the 2012 Super Rugby season as a half-time substitute for Dusty Noble as the Cheetahs narrowly lost 25–27 to the Lions in Johannesburg. Despite this early setback Le Roux went on to have an excellent first season in Super Rugby, playing mostly on the wing where he scored 7 tries in 16 appearances. His second season proved even more successful as he helped the Cheetahs reach the play-offs with a further 6 tries in 17 matches.

In July 2013, it was announced that Le Roux had signed a new contract with the Cheetahs until the end of 2015, which also meant that he would play for the Free State Cheetahs domestically from 2014 onwards.

He left the Cheetahs after the 2015 Super Rugby season to spend some time playing in Japan with Canon Eagles before joining the Sharks for 2016.

In August 2016, English Premiership side Wasps announced Le Roux would join them in January 2017 after finishing his commitments with the Canon Eagles. He left Wasps in 2019 having played 57 games and scoring 65 points.

On 5 May 2019, Le Roux returned to Japan to sign for Toyota Verblitz in the Top League from the 2019–20 season.

On 4 July 2023, Le Roux returned to South Africa to join the Blue Bulls, where he began playing after the Springboks' World Cup campaign. He made his debut on 25 November 2023 against Connacht in the United Rugby Championship scoring one try in their 53-27 win.

== International career ==
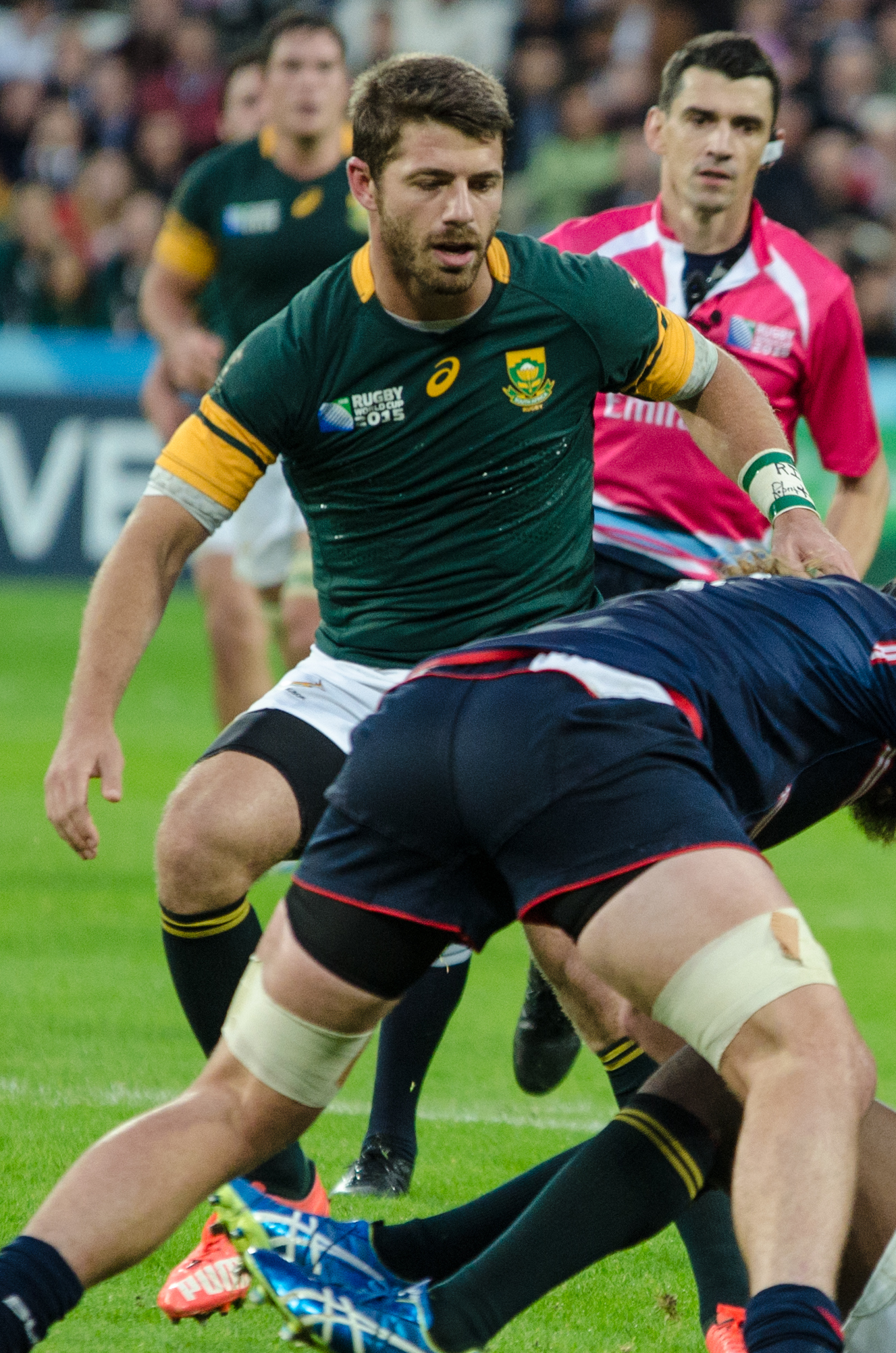
le Roux with South Africa at the 2015 Rugby World Cup

Le Roux was selected to represent the Springboks for the first time during the South African Quadrangular tournament of 2013 against Italy, Scotland and Samoa. He played the full 80 minutes of all three test matches against these teams with distinction, hardly faltering any time at full-back, and contributed to the try-making by joining the Springbok backline in sprints for the opponents' tryline.

He also played an integral part in South Africa's 2013 Rugby Championship campaign, featuring in all six matches. He scored tries in both home and away tests against Australia and in the deciding game at home to New Zealand.

Le Roux started the 2013 end-of-year tests on the bench for the match against Wales, however an injury to starting fly-half Morne Steyn saw him enter to the fray as an early substitute in the full-back position. It was a position he was to retain for the remaining two tour matches. He turned in a particularly impressive display in the 28-0 destruction of Scotland scoring one intercept try and setting up another immediately from the restart for team-mate JP Pietersen.

On 14 June 2014, Le Roux produced a man-of-the-match performance to help South Africa beat Wales during the 2014 incoming tours, scoring a try and providing three assists.

In 2014, he was one of five nominees for the IRB Player of the Year award.

Le Roux was named in South Africa's squad for the 2019 Rugby World Cup. South Africa went on to win the tournament, defeating England in the final.

Le Roux was named in South Africa's 33 man squad for the 2023 Rugby World Cup. South Africa went on to win the tournament, defeating New Zealand in the final. He is one of 43 players who have won the Rugby World Cup on multiple occasions, 25 of whom are South Africans.

== Career statistics ==
=== Test record ===
As of 13 September 2025.

Against	P	W	D	L	T	Pts	W%
Argentina	13	11	0	2	1	5	84.62
Australia	16	10	0	6	2	10	62.5
British & Irish Lions	3	2	0	1	0	0	66.67
England	7	5	0	2	2	10	71.43
France	3	3	0	0	0	0	100
Georgia	1	1	0	0	0	0	100
Ireland	6	3	0	3	0	0	50
Italy	7	6	0	1	0	0	85.71
Japan	2	2	0	0	0	0	100
New Zealand	21	6	1	14	4	20	28.57
Romania	1	1	0	0	1	5	100
Samoa	3	3	0	0	0	0	100
Scotland	8	8	0	0	2	10	100
Tonga	1	1	0	0	1	5	100
United States	1	1	0	0	0	0	100
Wales	8	6	0	2	2	10	75
Total	101	69	1	31	15	75	68.32

=== International tries ===
Try	Opposing team	Location	Venue	Competition	Date	Result	Score
1	Australia	Brisbane, Australia	Suncorp Stadium	Rugby Championship	7 September 2013	Won	12 – 38
2	Australia	Cape Town, South Africa	Newlands	Rugby Championship	28 September 2013	Won	28 – 8
3	New Zealand	Johannesburg, South Africa	Ellis Park	Rugby Championship	5 October 2013	Lost	27 – 38
4	Scotland	Edinburgh, Scotland	Murrayfield	End-of-year rugby test series	17 November 2013	Won	0 – 28
5	Wales	Durban, South Africa	Kings Park	Mid-year rugby test series	14 June 2014	Won	38 – 16
6	Wales	Nelspruit, South Africa	Mbombela Stadium	Mid-year rugby test series	21 June 2014	Won	31 – 30
7	Scotland	Port Elizabeth, South Africa	Nelson Mandela Bay Stadium	Mid-year rugby test series	28 June 2014	Won	55 – 6
8	New Zealand	Johannesburg, South Africa	Ellis Park	Rugby Championship	25 July 2015	Lost	20 – 27
9	Argentina	Durban, South Africa	Kings Park	Rugby Championship	8 August 2015	Lost	25 – 37
10	England	London, England	Twickenham	End-of-year rugby test series	12 November 2016	Lost	37 – 21
11	England	Johannesburg, South Africa	Ellis Park	Test match	9 June 2018	Won	42 – 39
12	New Zealand	Wellington, New Zealand	Westpac Stadium	Rugby Championship	15 September 2018	Won	34 – 36
13	New Zealand	Mbombela, South Africa	Mbombela Stadium	Rugby Championship	7 August 2022	Won	26 – 10
14	Romania	Bordeaux, France	Nouveau Stade de Bordeaux	2023 Rugby World Cup Pool B	17 November 2023	Won	76 – 0
15	Tonga	Marseille, France	Stade Vélodrome	2023 Rugby World Cup Pool B	1 October 2023	Won	49 – 18

== Honours ==
South Africa

- Rugby World Cup: 2019, 2023
- The Rugby Championship: 2025
