= List of Ireland national rugby union team records =

The Ireland national rugby union team represents the island of Ireland in international rugby union and plays in the Six Nations Championship and Rugby World Cup.

Thomas Gisborne Gordon, who played for Ireland between 1877–78, is the only one handed player to have competed in international rugby of either code.

== Career ==
=== Most caps ===
Ten current or retired members of the Ireland team have earned 100 or more test caps. Ireland's all-time cap leader is Cian Healy with 137 followed by Brian O'Driscoll with 133. The active player with the most caps are Tadhg Furlong and Iain Henderson with 86 caps, followed by Robbie Henshaw with 84 caps.

These figures do not include caps for the Lions. When those are included, O'Driscoll has 141 international caps, Murray has 133 caps, O'Gara has 130 caps and Sexton has 124 caps.

| # | Player | Career span | Caps | Tries | Pts |
|---|---|---|---|---|---|
| 1 | Cian Healy | 2009–2025 | 137 | 13 | 65 |
| 2 | Brian O'Driscoll | 1999–2014 | 133 | 46 | 245 |
| 3 | Ronan O'Gara | 2000–2013 | 128 | 16 | 1083 |
| 4 | Conor Murray | 2011–2025 | 125 | 18 | 115 |
| 5 | Rory Best | 2005–2019 | 124 | 12 | 60 |
| 6 | Johnny Sexton | 2009–2023 | 118 | 18 | 1108 |
| 7 | Peter O'Mahony | 2012–2025 | 114 | 5 | 25 |
| 8 | Paul O'Connell | 2002–2015 | 108 | 8 | 40 |
| 9 | John Hayes | 2000–2011 | 105 | 2 | 10 |
| 10 | Keith Earls | 2008–2023 | 101 | 36 | 180 |

Last updated: Italy vs Ireland, 15 March 2025. Statistics include officially capped matches only.

=== Most tries ===
Ireland's record try scorer is Brian O'Driscoll, who notched 46 career tries, which ranks him tenth in international tries.

| # | Player | Career span | Tries | Caps | Ave. |
|---|---|---|---|---|---|
| 1 | Brian O'Driscoll | 1999–2014 | 46 | 133 | 0.35 |
| 2 | Keith Earls | 2008–2023 | 36 | 101 | 0.36 |
| 3 | Tommy Bowe | 2004–2017 | 30 | 69 | 0.43 |
| 4 | Denis Hickie | 1997–2007 | 29 | 62 | 0.47 |
| 5 | Shane Horgan | 2000–2009 | 21 | 65 | 0.32 |
| 6 | Jacob Stockdale | 2017– | 20 | 43 | 0.47 |
| 7 | Girvan Dempsey | 1998–2008 | 19 | 82 | 0.23 |
| 7 | Dan Sheehan | 2021– | 19 | 44 | 0.43 |
| 9 | Bundee Aki | 2017– | 18 | 75 | 0.24 |
| 9 | Geordan Murphy | 2000–2011 | 18 | 72 | 0.25 |
| 9 | Conor Murray | 2011–2025 | 18 | 125 | 0.14 |
| 9 | Johnny Sexton | 2009–2023 | 18 | 118 | 0.15 |
| 9 | Hugo Keenan | 2020– | 18 | 51 | 0.35 |

Last updated: Ireland vs South Africa, 21 November 2026. Statistics include officially capped matches only.

=== Most points ===
Johnny Sexton holds the Ireland record for test points with 1,108, placing him fourth all-time in international rugby union. Johnny Sexton is the highest points scorers in the Six Nations with 566 points, followed by Ronan O'Gara with 557.

| # | Player | Career span | Points | Caps | Tries | Con. | Pen. | DG | Ave. |
|---|---|---|---|---|---|---|---|---|---|
| 1 | Johnny Sexton | 2009–2023 | 1,108 | 118 | 18 | 182 | 214 | 4 | 9.39 |
| 2 | Ronan O'Gara | 2000–2013 | 1,083 | 128 | 16 | 176 | 202 | 15 | 8.46 |
| 3 | David Humphreys | 1996–2005 | 560 | 72 | 6 | 88 | 110 | 8 | 7.78 |
| 4 | Michael Kiernan | 1982–1991 | 308 | 43 | 6 | 40 | 62 | 6 | 7.16 |
| 5 | Eric Elwood | 1993–1999 | 296 | 35 | 0 | 43 | 68 | 2 | 8.46 |
| 6 | Brian O'Driscoll | 1999–2014 | 245 | 133 | 46 | 0 | 0 | 5 | 1.84 |
| 7 | Jack Crowley | 2022– | 231 | 35 | 4 | 65 | 26 | 1 | 6.79 |
| 8 | Ollie Campbell | 1976–1984 | 217 | 22 | 1 | 15 | 54 | 7 | 9.86 |
| 9 | Paddy Jackson | 2013–2017 | 195 | 25 | 2 | 46 | 30 | 1 | 7.8 |
| 10 | Keith Earls | 2008–2023 | 180 | 101 | 36 | 0 | 0 | 0 | 1.78 |

Last updated: Ireland vs Scotland, 14 March 2026. Statistics include officially capped matches only.

=== Most matches as captain ===
Brian O'Driscoll is third on the all-time list for test matches as captain. He has captained Ireland 83 times and the Lions once.

| # | Player | Span | Captaincies | Caps | Wins | Win % |
|---|---|---|---|---|---|---|
| 1 | Brian O'Driscoll | 2002–2012 | 83 | 133 | 52 | 62.65% |
| 2 | Rory Best | 2009–2019 | 38 | 124 | 24 | 63.16% |
| 3 | Keith Wood | 1996–2003 | 36 | 58 | 15 | 41.67% |
| 4 | Johnny Sexton | 2019–2023 | 30 | 118 | 25 | 83.33% |
| 5 | Paul O'Connell | 2004–2015 | 28 | 108 | 18 | 64.29% |
| 6 | Tom Kiernan | 1963–1973 | 24 | 54 | 16 | 66.67% |
| 7 | Ciarán Fitzgerald | 1982–1986 | 19 | 25 | 9 | 47.37% |
| 8 | Dónal Lenihan | 1986–1990 | 17 | 52 | 8 | 47.06% |
| 8 | Fergus Slattery | 1979–1981 | 17 | 61 | 5 | 29.41% |
| 10 | Michael Bradley | 1992–1995 | 15 | 40 | 5 | 33.33% |
| 10 | Ernie Crawford | 1924–1927 | 15 | 30 | 11 | 73.33% |
| 10 | Karl Mullen | 1947–1952 | 15 | 25 | 10 | 66.67% |

Last updated: Italy vs Ireland, 15 March 2025. Statistics include officially capped matches only.

== Single match ==
=== Most points in a match ===
| # | Player | Pos | Pts | Tries | Con | Pen | DG | Result | Opposition | Date |
|---|---|---|---|---|---|---|---|---|---|---|
| 1 | Ronan O'Gara | Fly-half | 32 | 2 | 2 | 5 | 1 | 40–14 | Samoa | 20 June 2003 |
| 2 | Ronan O'Gara | Fly-half | 30 | 0 | 6 | 6 | 0 | 60–13 | Italy | 4 March 2000 |
| 3 | David Humphreys | Fly-half | 26 | 1 | 3 | 5 | 0 | 36–6 | Scotland | 16 February 2003 |
| 3 | David Humphreys | Fly-half | 26 | 1 | 6 | 3 | 0 | 61–6 | Italy | 30 August 2003 |
| 3 | Paddy Wallace | Fly-half | 26 | 1 | 6 | 3 | 0 | 61–17 | Pacific Islanders | 26 November 2006 |
| 6 | Paul Burke | Fly-half | 24 | 0 | 0 | 8 | 0 | 29–37 | Italy | 4 January 1997 |
| 6 | David Humphreys | Fly-half | 24 | 0 | 0 | 7 | 1 | 24–28 | Argentina | 20 October 1999 |
| 6 | Jack Crowley | Fly-half | 24 | 0 | 12 | 0 | 0 | 106–7 | Portugal | 12 July 2025 |
| 6 | Johnny Sexton | Fly-half | 24 | 2 | 7 | 0 | 0 | 82–8 | Romania | 9 September 2023 |

Last updated: Portugal vs Ireland, 12 July 2025. Statistics include officially capped matches only.

=== Most tries in a match ===
| Tries | Player | Position | Result | Opposition | Date |
|---|---|---|---|---|---|
| 4 | Brian Robinson | Number 8 | 55–11 | Zimbabwe | 6 October 1991 |
| 4 | Keith Wood | Hooker | 53–8 | United States | 2 October 1999 |
| 4 | Denis Hickie | Wing | 61–6 | Italy | 30 August 2003 |
| 4 | Rónan Kelleher | Hooker | 71–10 | United States | 10 July 2021 |
| 3 | (Several players tied) | | | | |

Last updated: Italy vs Ireland, 15 March 2025. Statistics include officially capped matches only.

== Player age ==
=== Youngest players ===
| # | Player | Age | DOB | Debut | Opposition |
|---|---|---|---|---|---|
| 1 | Frank Hewitt | 17 years 157 days | 3 October 1906 | 8 March 1924 | Wales |
| 2 | John Quirke | 17 years 229 days | 26 June 1944 | 10 February 1962 | England |
| 3 | George McAllan | 18 years 13 days | 2 February 1878 | 15 February 1896 | Scotland |
| 4 | Edmund Forrest | 18 years 57 days | 5 October 1870 | 1 December 1888 | (New Zealand) N.Z. Natives |
| 5 | Aidan Bailey | 18 years 68 days | 1 January 1916 | 10 March 1934 | Wales |
| 6 | George Stephenson | 18 years 103 days | 22 December 1901 | 3 April 1920 | France |
| 7 | David Hewitt | 18 years 131 days | 9 September 1939 | 18 January 1958 | Australia |
| 8 | Frederick Harvey | 18 years 189 days | 1 September 1888 | 9 March 1907 | Wales |
| 9 | Dickie Lloyd | 18 years 192 days | 4 August 1891 | 12 February 1910 | England |
| 10 | Jasper Brett | 18 years 218 days | 8 August 1895 | 14 March 1914 | Wales |

Last updated: Ireland vs Argentina, 15 November 2024. Statistics include officially capped matches only.

=== Oldest players ===
| # | Player | Age | DOB | Last match | Opposition |
|---|---|---|---|---|---|
| 1 | Johnny Sexton | 38 years 92 days | 11 July 1985 | 14 October 2023 | New Zealand |
| 2 | John Hayes | 37 years 277 days | 2 November 1973 | 6 August 2011 | Scotland |
| 3 | Cian Healy | 37 years 161 days | 7 October 1987 | 8 March 2025 | France |
| 4 | Rory Best | 37 years 65 days | 15 August 1982 | 19 October 2019 | New Zealand |
| 5 | Bundee Aki | 36 years 228 days | 7 April 1990 | 21 November 2026 | South Africa |
| 6 | Mike Gibson | 36 years 195 days | 3 December 1942 | 16 June 1979 | Australia |
| 7 | Mike Ross | 36 years 187 days | 21 December 1979 | 25 June 2016 | South Africa |
| 8 | Phil Orr | 36 years 175 days | 14 December 1950 | 7 June 1987 | Australia |
| 9 | Peter Clohessy | 36 years 15 days | 22 March 1966 | 6 April 2002 | France |
| 10 | Paul O'Connell | 35 years 356 days | 20 October 1979 | 12 October 2015 | France |

Last updated: Ireland vs South Africa, 21 November 2026. Statistics include officially capped matches only.

== Team margins ==
=== Biggest winning margin ===
| Margin | Date | Game | Ground |
|---|---|---|---|
| 99 | 12 July 2025 | Portugal 7–106 Ireland | Estadio Nacional do Jamor, Algés Portugal |
| 80 | 10 June 2000 | United States 3–83 Ireland | Singer Family Park, Manchester, New Hampshire, US |
| 74 | 9 September 2023 | Ireland 82–8 Romania | Stade de Bordeaux, Bordeaux, France |
| 70 | 14 November 1998 | Ireland 70–0 Georgia | Lansdowne Road, Dublin, Ireland |
| 69 | 11 November 2000 | Ireland 78–9 Japan | Lansdowne Road, Dublin, Ireland |
| 61 | 10 July 2021 | Ireland 71–10 United States | Aviva Stadium, Dublin, Ireland |
| 60 | 1 November 1986 | Ireland 60–0 Romania | Lansdowne Road, Dublin, Ireland |
| 57 | 19 October 2003 | Ireland 64–7 Namibia | Sydney Football Stadium, Sydney, Australia |
| 55 | 6 November 2021 | Ireland 60–5 Japan | Aviva Stadium, Dublin, Ireland |
| 55 | 8 November 2008 | Ireland 55–0 Canada | Thomond Park, Limerick, Ireland |
| 55 | 30 August 2003 | Ireland 61–6 Italy | Thomond Park, Limerick, Ireland |

Last updated: Portugal vs Ireland, 12 July 2025. Statistics include officially capped matches only.

=== Biggest losing margin ===
| Margin | Date | Game | Ground |
|---|---|---|---|
| 60 | 23 June 2012 | New Zealand 60–0 Ireland | Waikato Stadium, Hamilton, New Zealand |
| 53 | 6 June 1992 | New Zealand 59–6 Ireland | Athletic Park, Wellington, New Zealand |
| 48 | 15 November 1997 | Ireland 15–63 New Zealand | Lansdowne Road, Dublin, Ireland |
| 42 | 24 August 2019 | England 57–15 Ireland | Twickenham, London, England |
| 40 | 15 February 1997 | Ireland 6–46 England | Lansdowne Road, Dublin, Ireland |
| 39 | 6 April 2002 | France 44–5 Ireland | Stade de France, Paris, France |
| 38 | 12 June 2010 | New Zealand 66–28 Ireland | Yarrow Stadium, New Plymouth, New Zealand |
| 38 | 12 November 2005 | Ireland 7–45 New Zealand | Lansdowne Road, Dublin, Ireland |
| 38 | 30 November 1912 | Ireland 0–38 South Africa | Lansdowne Road, Dublin, Ireland |
| 36 | 30 March 2003 | Ireland 6–42 England | Lansdowne Road, Dublin, Ireland |

Last updated: Ireland vs Argentina, 15 November 2024. Statistics include officially capped matches only.
