= Jasper Brett =

Irish rugby union player

- Born: Jasper Thomas Brett; 8 August 1895 Kingstown (now Dún Laoghaire), Ireland
- Died: 4 February 1917 (aged 21) Dalkey, Dublin, Ireland

Rugby union career
- Position: Wing
Senior career
Years	Team	Apps	(Points)
- Monkstown
International career
Years	Team	Apps	(Points)
1914	Ireland	1	

Jasper Thomas Brett (8 August 1895 – 4 February 1917) was an Irish rugby international and a solicitor's apprentice. He won one cap against Wales in 1914 and is currently the 10th youngest international rugby player for Ireland.

He served during the First World War in the British Army as Second Lieutenant in the 10th Company of the 7th Battalion of the Royal Dublin Fusiliers. He was one of the few survivors of that company's gruesome slaughter at Gallipoli, followed by posting to the horrors of Salonika. He there developed shell shock, suffering gastritis, monomania, melancholia and confusional insanity and was transferred to a military psychiatric hospital. He took his own life at Dalkey, Dublin, on 4 February 1917, aged 22, two days before he was due to return to the frontline, by placing his head on the railway line in the Dalkey tunnel and being decapitated by a train. He was buried at Dean's Grange Cemetery.

== See also ==
- List of international rugby union players killed in action during the First World War
