= Afusipa Taumoepeau =

Tonga international rugby union player

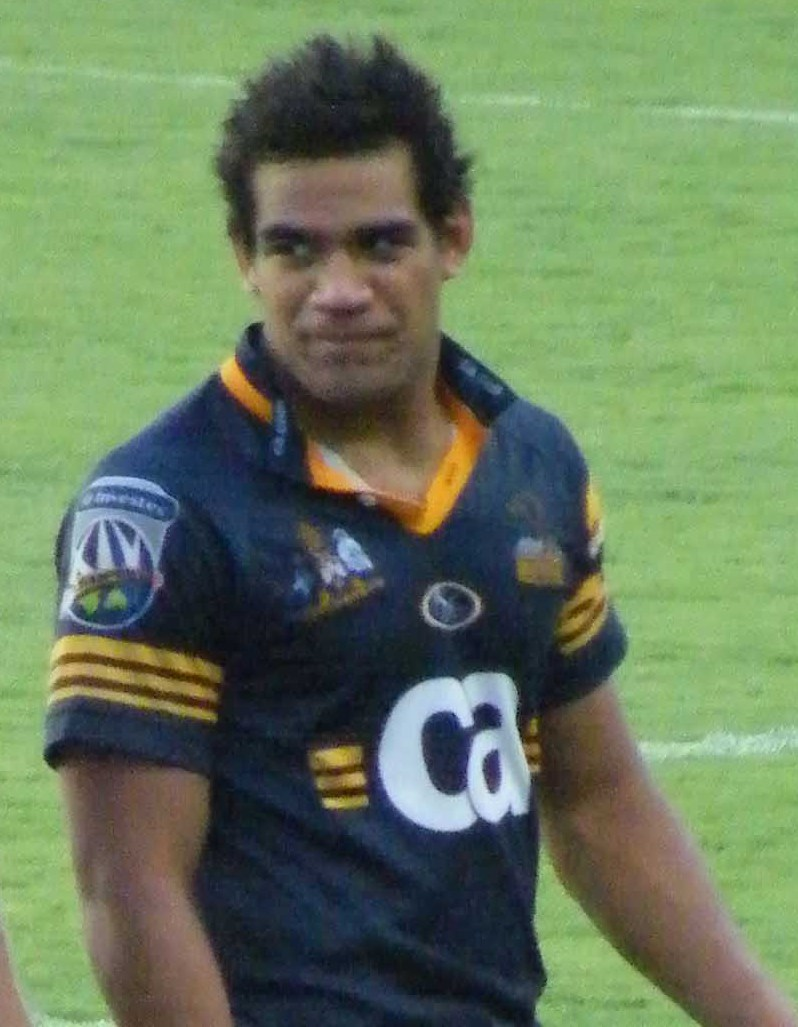
- Taumoepeau representing the Brumbies during the Super 14
- Full name: Afusipa Faha Ivalu Taumoepeau
- Born: 26 January 1990 (age 36) Sydney, New South Wales, Australia
- Height: 1.84 m (6 ft 0 in)
- Weight: 95 kg (209 lb; 14 st 13 lb)
- School: St. Joseph's College

Rugby union career
- Position(s): Centre, Wing
- Current team: Perpignan
Senior career
Years	Team	Apps	(Points)
2008–2010	Brumbies	10	(0)
2011	Rebels	11	(10)
2011–2014	Pau	55	(35)
2014–2016	Albi	51	(60)
2016–2018	Castres	50	(20)
2018–	Perpignan	105	(90)
- Correct as of 28 August 2023
International career
Years	Team	Apps	(Points)
2009	Australia U20	5	(5)
2021–	Tonga	13	(5)
- Correct as of 28 August 2023
National sevens team
Years	Team		Comps
2021	Tonga		1
- Correct as of 28 August 2023

Afusipa Faha Ivalu Taumoepeau (born 26 January 1990) is a professional rugby union player who plays as a centre for Top 14 club Perpignan. Born in Australia, he represents Tonga at international level after qualifying on ancestry grounds

== Early life and junior rugby career ==
Afusipa Taumoepeau's rugby journey began with remarkable achievements at the Oatley Junior Rugby Union Football Club. In 2003, he distinguished himself by earning the prestigious **Junior Player of the Year** award, underscoring his exceptional talent. During that season, Taumoepeau played 14 matches, amassing an impressive 35 tries and 7 goals, a feat that highlighted his dominance on the field. His performance also earned him **Southern Districts Representative Honours** for the Under 13's category, marking him as a standout player in his age group. These early accolades foreshadowed his successful professional career, showcasing his early potential and dedication to the sport.

== Club career ==
Taumoepeau was schooled at St Joseph's College, Hunters Hill and represented Australia at under 20 level, and as part of the Australian Sevens.

He made his debut for the Brumbies in the 2008 Super 14 season, at aged 18. He spent three seasons with the Brumbies. In October 2010 he signed to the Melbourne Rebels and became the Rebels 32nd squad member. Playing in a trial, in preparation for the 2011 Super Rugby season in a pre-season match against Tonga at Olympic Park, Taumoepeau scored a try and earned the honour of scoring the Rebels' first ever pre-season points.

In 2011 he joined French team Pau in the French second division (Pro D2) where he stayed 3 years. He then signed for Albi in the same division for 2 years. In 2016 he joined Castres, in the French Top 14 league. On 2 June 2018 he became a Top 14 champion, Castres beating Montpellier in the final. On 5 June he joined Perpignan, still in the Top 14, for a 3 year contract.

He is not the only one involved with rugby in his family. He has an older brother, Pauliasi Taumoepeau who captained both the St Joseph's College 1st XV and Australian Schoolboys in 2004 and who later played for Eastern Suburbs Rugby Union in Sydney.

Taumoepeau made his test debut for Tonga on 7 November 2021 as part of a 69-3 loss to England during the 2021 Autumn Nations Series

== Honours ==
Castres

- 1× Top 14: 2017–18
