= Aidan Bailey =

Irish rugby union player

- Full name: Aidan Hilary Bailey
- Born: 1916 or 1917 Dublin, Ireland
- Died: 6 June 1976 Bray, Ireland
- Notable relative: Niall Bailey (nephew)

Rugby union career
- Position: Centre
International career
Years	Team	Apps	(Points)
1934–38	Ireland	13	(22)

Aidan Hilary Bailey (1 January 1916 — 6 June 1976) was an Irish international rugby union player.

Born in Dublin, Bailey attended Presentation College, Bray, and helped their rugby XV claim the Leinster Schools Senior Cup in 1932. He was still a schoolboy when he made his debut for Ireland in 1934, against Wales at Swansea. Primarily used as a centre, Bailey was capped 13 times for Ireland, making his last appearance in 1938.

== See also ==
- List of Ireland national rugby union players
