= Taliaʻuli Sikuea =

Romanian rugby union player

- Full name: Taliaʻuli Sikuea Malohi Niutakeifanga Falekaono
- Born: 14 July 1995 (age 31) Tonga
- Height: 1.89 m (6 ft 2 1/2 in)
- Weight: 98 kg (15 st 6 lb; 216 lb)

Rugby union career
- Position(s): Centre; Wing
Amateur team(s)
Years	Team	Apps	(Points)
–2016	Toloa Old Boys		
Senior career
Years	Team	Apps	(Points)
2016–present	CSM Știința Baia Mare	56	(180)
- Correct as of 8 September 2023
International career
Years	Team	Apps	(Points)
2015	Tonga U-20	3	(10)
2023–present	Romania	1	(5)
- Correct as of 8 September 2023
National sevens teams
Years	Team		Comps
2016	Tonga		2
2023	Romania		1

Taliaʻuli Sikuea (born 14 July 1995) is a Romanian rugby union player who plays for CSM Știința Baia Mare in the Liga Națională de Rugby.

== Club career ==
Sikuea began his senior career at Toloa Old Boys in Tonga before joining Romanian outfit CSM Știința Baia Mare in 2016. Ever since his transfer to Baia Mare, Sikuea has become a prominent try scorer for his side. Currently, Sikuea has won four straight league titles for the team since he first joined.

== International career ==
Sikuea represented Tonga at the 2015 World Rugby Under 20 Trophy, as well as the sevens team national in the 2016 men's rugby sevens final Olympic qualification tournament. In 2023, Sikuea represented the Romanian national sevens team during the 2023 European Games and he also made his debut for the Oaks against the United States during the 2023 Rugby World Cup warm-up matches, scoring a try on his debut.

== Honours ==
=== CSM Știința Baia Mare ===
- Liga Națională de Rugby: 2018–19, 2019-20, 2021, 2022
- Cupa României: 2020
- Cupa Regelui: 2016, 2017
