= Trevor Nyakane =

South Africa international rugby union player

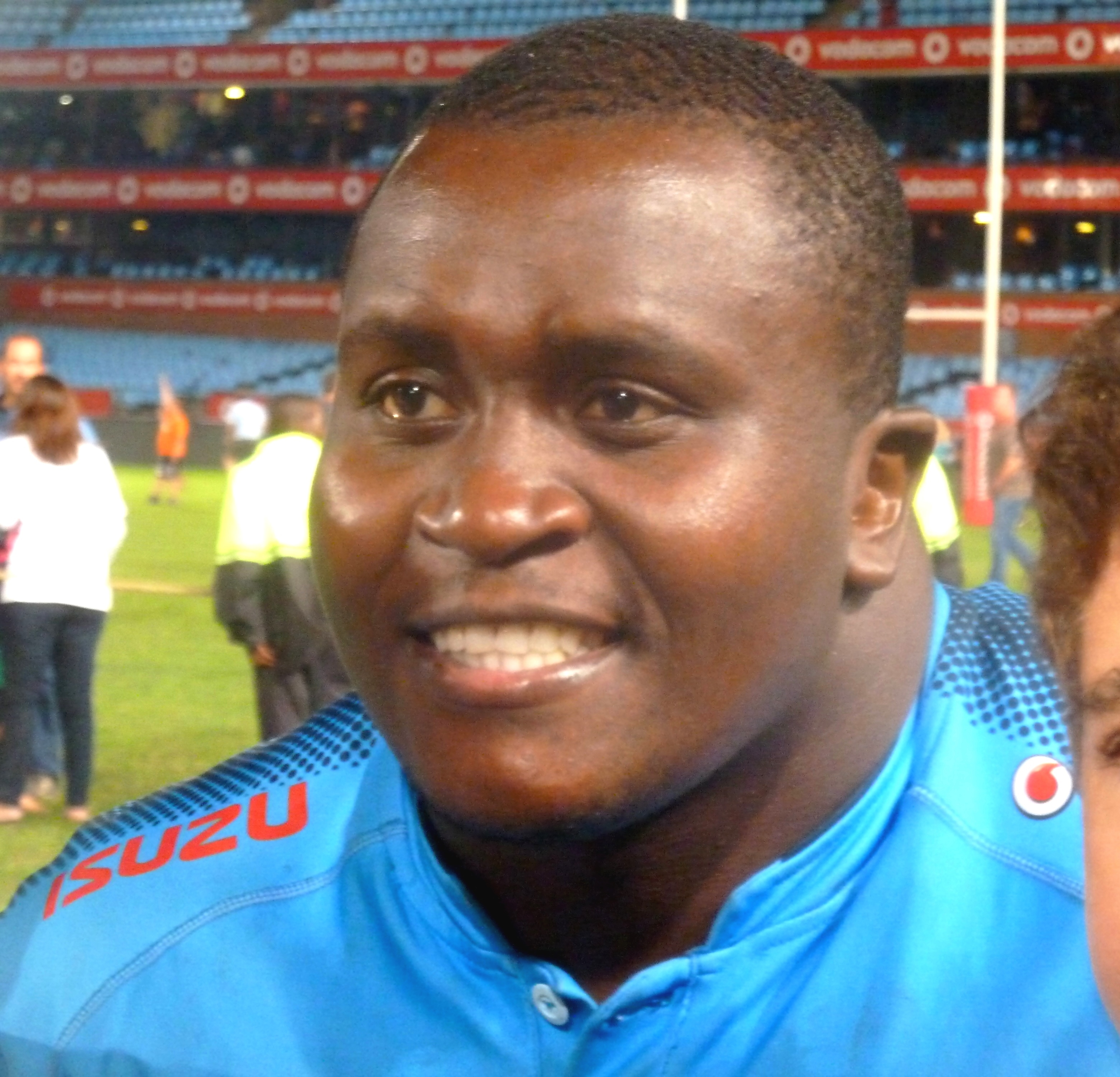
- Nyakane in 2017
- Full name: Trevor Ntando Nyakane
- Born: 4 May 1989 (age 37) Bushbuckridge, South Africa
- Height: 1.78 m (5 ft 10 in)
- Weight: 121 kg (267 lb; 19 st 1 lb)
- School: Hoërskool Ben Vorster

Rugby union career
- Position: Prop
- Current team: Sharks
Youth career
- 2005–2007: Limpopo Blue Bulls
- 2008–2010: Free State Cheetahs
Amateur team(s)
Years	Team	Apps	(Points)
2011–2012	CUT Ixias		
Senior career
Years	Team	Apps	(Points)
2010–2014	Free State Cheetahs	38	(10)
2011	Emerging Cheetahs	1	(0)
2011	→ Griffons	1	(0)
2012–2014	Cheetahs	42	(15)
2015–2021	Bulls	82	(0)
2018–2021	Blue Bulls	10	(0)
2022-2024	Racing 92	57	(10)
2024-	Sharks	13	(0)
- Correct as of 23 July 2026
International career
Years	Team	Apps	(Points)
2007	S.A. Schools Academy		
2013–	South Africa	66	(5)
2016	Springbok XV	1	(0)
2017	South Africa A	2	(0)
- Correct as of 9 August 2024
Medal record
Men's Rugby 15's
Representing South Africa
Rugby World Cup
Bronze medal – third place	2015 England	Squad
Gold medal – first place	2019 Japan	Squad
Gold medal – first place	2023 France	Squad

Trevor Ntando Nyakane (born 4 May 1989) is a South African professional rugby union player who currently plays for the Sharks in the United Rugby Championship and also the South Africa national rugby team, His regular playing position is prop and he has the ability to play at both loosehead and tighthead.

== Early career ==
Nyakane attended school in Limpopo top rugby school Ben Vorster where he played for the first team for two years. He was chosen to represent Limpopo at the Grant Khomo, and Craven Weeks tournaments in 2006 and 2007.

== Professional career ==
Nyakane currently represents the Sharks, he has amassed more than 200 senior appearances across several clubs in South Africa and France.

He attended his primary school in laerskool Gravelotte in Limpopo.

== International career ==
Nyakane was first named in the Springbok squad ahead of the 2013 mid-year rugby union tests.

He made his international debut on 8 June as a 73rd minute replacement for Tendai Mtawarira in South Africa's 44-10 victory over Italy in Durban. On 22 June 2013 he scored his first test try, against Samoa, in Pretoria. With South Africa already leading 49-23, Nyakane's 80th minute score completed a comprehensive victory.

Nyakane was named in South Africa's squad for the 2019 Rugby World Cup. However he had to withdraw through injury in the pool stage and was replaced by Thomas du Toit. South Africa went on to win the tournament, defeating England in the final.

Nyakane was included in the South Africa A team to face the British and Irish Lions as a warm up match. The Team was Captained by Lukhanyo Am and had other members of the 2019 World Cup winning side. The match was an exhibition match that didn't count towards a Test cap, but was won by the South African A side.

Nyakane started at tighthead prop for the opening test of the 2021 British & Irish Lions tour to South Africa. Injury to Ox Nché in that first test led Nyakane to switch roles to become the replacement loosehead prop for the subsequent two tests of the series. Despite not having played at loosehead prop for the Springboks since 2016, Nyakane's scrummaging earned the Springboks a number of crucial scrum penalties in the later half of the remaining games which saw the South Africans winning the series.

Nyakane was also part of the Bomb Squad in the 2019 World Cup based on the 6/2 split of the bench and in 2023 was also an inaugural member of the Nuke Squad based on a 7/1 split of the bench when the Springboks gave the All Blacks their worst loss in modern day rugby history 35-7 at Twickenham, just before the 2023 World Cup in France. The test was billed as Qatar Airways Cup

Trevor played a number of matches in the 2023 Rugby World Cup as well as the final.

In 2025, Nyakane underwent surgery to repair a ruptured achilles tendon.

== Honours ==
- Currie Cup 2020–21 - Winner
- 2015 Rugby World Cup - third place bronze medalist
- 2019 Rugby Championship - Winner
- 2019 Rugby World Cup Japan - Winner
- 2021 South Africa A vs British and Irish Lions (warm up match) - Winner
- 2021 British and Irish Lions Series Tour - Winner
- 2023 Qatar Airways Cup at Twickenham vs New Zealand - Winner
- 2023 Rugby World Cup - Winner
- Currie Cup 2024 - Winner

== Springbok statistics ==
=== Test Match Record ===
As of 9 August 2024

Against	P	W	D	L	Tri	Pts	%Won
Argentina	11	10	0	1	0	0	90.91
Australia	8	3	2	3	0	0	37.5
British & Irish Lions	3	2	0	1	0	0	66.67
England	2	1	0	1	0	0	50
France	1	1	0	0	0	0	100
Georgia	1	1	0	0	0	0	100
Ireland	4	1	0	3	0	0	25
Italy	4	3	0	1	0	0	75
Japan	2	1	0	1	0	0	50
New Zealand	13	5	1	7	0	0	38.46
Portugal	1	1	0	0	0	0	100
Romania	1	1	0	0	0	0	100
Samoa	2	2	0	0	1	5	100
Scotland	5	5	0	0	0	0	100
Tonga	1	1	0	0	0	0	100
United States	1	1	0	0	0	0	100
Wales	6	3	0	3	0	0	50
Total	66	42	3	21	1	5	64.62

Pld = Games Played, W = Games Won, D = Games Drawn, L = Games Lost, Tri = Tries Scored, Pts = Points Scored

=== International Tries ===
Try	Opposing team	Location	Venue	Competition	Date	Result
1	Samoa	Pretoria, South Africa	Loftus Versfeld	Mid-year rugby test series	22 June 2013	Won 56–23
