= Steven Kitshoff =

South African rugby union player

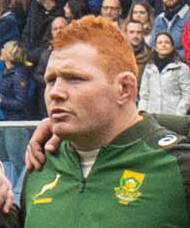
- Kitshoff in 2022
- Born: 10 February 1992 (age 34) Somerset West, South Africa
- Height: 1.83 m (6 ft 0 in)
- Weight: 120 kg (18 st 13 lb; 265 lb)
- School: Paul Roos Gymnasium

Rugby union career
- Position: Loosehead Prop
Youth career
- 2005–2012: Western Province
Senior career
Years	Team	Apps	(Points)
2011–2015	Western Province	39	(5)
2011–2015	Stormers	60	(0)
2015–2017	Bordeaux	34	(10)
2017–2023	Stormers	64	(15)
2017–2023	Western Province	5	(5)
2023–2024	Ulster	14	(0)
2024–2025	Stormers	10	(0)
2024–2025	Western Province	2	(5)
- Correct as of 3 January 2026
International career
Years	Team	Apps	(Points)
2012	South Africa U20	5	(5)
2016–2023	South Africa	83	(10)
- Correct as of 29 October 2023
Medal record
Men's Rugby union
Representing South Africa
Rugby World Cup
Gold medal – first place	2019 Japan	Squad
Gold medal – first place	2023 France	Squad

Steven Kitshoff (born 10 February 1992) is a South African former rugby union player who last played for the Stormers. His playing position was loosehead prop. He represented the South Africa national team and has previously played for Bordeaux in the French Top 14 and Western Province in the Currie Cup. He joined Ulster for the 2023–24 season.

Kitshoff was a member of the South Africa Under 20 team that won the 2012 IRB Junior World Championship. In addition, Kitshoff was part of the Western Province team that won the 2012 Currie Cup. He retired from professional rugby in 2025 due to complications sustained in a serious neck injury in 2024.

== Early life and education ==
Kitshoff attended Hendrik Louw Primary School and Paul Roos Gymnasium.

== Career ==
Kitshoff first broke through during the 2011 season, making 5 substitute appearances for the Stormers and then 5 Currie Cup appearances for Western Province while still only a teenager. He became more of a regular during 2012, nailing down the number 1 jersey for both the Stormers and Western Province and also winning the Currie Cup title with Province in an impressive win over the Sharks in Durban. His 2013 Super Rugby campaign was solid and he carried that form into the Currie Cup later in the year where he was an ever-present as Province reached a second consecutive Currie Cup final this time going down at home to the Sharks. 2014 was a year of frustration as he succumbed to a season-ending injury towards the back-end of the Super Rugby season and this ruled him out of Western Province's successful Currie Cup campaign in which they lifted the title for the second time in three years with a narrow win over the Golden Lions at Newlands.

In February 2015, it was revealed that Kitshoff would join French Top 14 side Bordeaux at the conclusion of the 2015 Currie Cup Premier Division season. He spent two seasons in France before returning to Cape Town in 2017. In his second stint with the Stormers, he was named captain of the team in 2021, and led the team as they won the inaugural United Rugby Championship in 2022. He signed for Ulster ahead of the 2023–24 season, and returned to the Stormers at the end of the season.

Following his return from Ulster, Steven Kitshoff suffered a serious neck injury during the Currie Cup match against Griquas. Following medical advice, he underwent neck fusion surgery on 20 November to aid in his recovery. He later said the injury was near-fatal, citing his doctors who said that the affected vertebra, which shifted, was located near his central canal at a distance of two millimetres. On 25 February 2025, Kitshoff announced his retirement from professional rugby, citing his injury.

=== International rugby ===
On 28 May 2016, Kitshoff was included in a 31-man South Africa squad for their three-test match series against a touring Ireland team.

Kitshoff was named in South Africa's squad for the 2019 Rugby World Cup and the 2023 Rugby World Cup. South Africa went on to win both tournaments, defeating England in the 2019 final and New Zealand in the 2023 final.

== Honours ==
Western Province

- 2012 Currie Cup winner

Stormers

- 2022 United Rugby Championship winner

South Africa

- 2012 IRB Junior World Championship
- 2019 Rugby Championship
- 2019 Rugby World Cup
- 2021 British & Irish Lions tour to South Africa series winner
- 2023 Rugby World Cup

== Springbok statistics ==
=== Test Match Record ===
Against	P	W	D	L	Tri	Pts	%Won
Argentina	11	9	0	2	0	0	81.82
Australia	11	4	2	5	0	0	36.36
British & Irish Lions	3	2	0	1	0	0	66.67
Canada	1	1	0	0	0	0	100
England	9	5	0	4	0	0	55.56
France	7	6	0	1	0	0	85.71
Georgia	1	1	0	0	0	0	100
Ireland	4	1	0	3	0	0	25
Italy	4	3	0	1	2	10	75
Japan	2	2	0	0	0	0	100
Namibia	1	1	0	0	0	0	100
New Zealand	15	5	1	9	0	0	33.33
Romania	1	1	0	0	0	0	100
Scotland	3	3	0	0	0	0	100
Tonga	1	1	0	0	0	0	100
Wales	9	5	0	4	0	0	55.56
Total	83	50	3	30	2	10	60.24

Pld = Games Played, W = Games Won, D = Games Drawn, L = Games Lost, Tri = Tries Scored, Pts = Points Scored

=== International tries ===
Try	Opposing team	Location	Venue	Competition	Date	Result	Score
1	Italy	Padua, Italy	Stadio Euganeo	2017 end-of-year rugby union internationals	25 November 2017	Win	6–35
2	Italy	Genoa, Italy	Stadio Luigi Ferraris	2022 end-of-year rugby union internationals	19 November 2022	Win	21–63

== Super Rugby statistics ==
As of 9 June 2020

Season	Team	Games	Starts	Sub	Mins	Tries	Points	Yellow card	Red card
2011	Stormers	5	0	5	126	0	0	0	0
2012	Stormers	15	15	0	1145	0	0	0	0
2013	Stormers	15	15	0	1158	0	0	0	0
2014	Stormers	11	10	1	673	0	0	0	0
2015	Stormers	15	15	0	993	0	0	1	0
2016	In Europe with Union Bordeaux Bègles								
2017	Stormers	3	0	3	102	0	0	0	0
2018	Stormers	15	11	4	827	2	10	0	0
2019	Stormers	13	12	1	773	0	0	0	0
2020	Stormers	6	6	0	387	1	5	0	0
Total		98	84	14	6184	3	15	1	0
