= 2021 Rugby Europe Championship squads =

This is a list of the complete squads for the rugby union 2021 Rugby Europe Championship contested annually by the national rugby teams of Georgia, Netherlands, Portugal, Romania, Russia and Spain. Georgia are the defending champions.

Note: Number of caps and players' ages are indicated as of 6 March 2021 – the tournament's opening day (except for the Netherlands who played their first match in July). For players added to a squad during the tournament, their caps and age are indicated as of the date of their call-up.

== Netherlands ==
Head Coach: (New Zealand) Zane Gardiner

Note: Flags indicate national union for the club/province as defined by World Rugby.

Player	Position	Date of birth (age)	Caps	Club/province
Ross Bennie-Coulson	Hooker		9	(Netherlands) Delta
Mark Darlington	Hooker	23 May 1985 (age 41)	21	(England) Maidenhead
Mike Mbaud	Hooker		0	(England) Ealing Trailfinders
David Anderson	Prop	4 August 1995 (age 31)	0	(Netherlands) Haagsche
Lodi Buijs	Prop	19 October 2000 (age 25)	1	(Netherlands) Delta
Andrew Darlington	Prop	6 January 1989 (age 37)	21	(France) Beaune
Delano Jansen van de Sligte	Prop		0	(Netherlands) Eemland
Hugo Langelaan	Prop	27 March 1990 (age 36)	26	(Netherlands) Delta
Robin Moenen	Prop	28 November 1995 (age 30)	8	(Netherlands) Delta
Koen Bloemen	Lock	13 May 1998 (age 28)	4	(France) Bourg-en-Bresse
Jim Boelrijk	Lock	6 February 1994 (age 32)	8	(Netherlands) Delta
Louis Bruinsma	Lock	15 July 2000 (age 26)	0	(France) Stade Montois
Dennis van Dijken	Lock	25 August 1999 (age 26)	1	(France) Graulhet
Marijn Huis	Lock		1	(England) The Hookers
Christopher van Leeuwen	Lock	26 April 1995 (age 31)	1	(France) Suresnes
Rikkert Verhofstad	Lock		3	(Netherlands) Haarlem
Mark Wokke	Lock			(Netherlands) Castricum
Dirk Danen	Back row	21 April 1989 (age 37)	27	(Netherlands) Delta
Wolf van Dijk	Back row	2 December 1999 (age 26)	6	(Netherlands) DIOK
Guy van den Dries	Back row	28 September 1993 (age 32)	0	(England) Belsize Park
Dave Koelman	Back row	16 January 2001 (age 25)	0	(France) Brive
Blake Nightingale	Back row	2 May 1992 (age 34)	7	(Netherlands) Delta
Christopher Raymond	Back row		0	(Netherlands) Delta
Niels van de Ven	Back row	20 April 1992 (age 34)	1	(Spain) Alcobendas
Maxou Zerdoun	Back row	13 October 2000 (age 25)	0	(Netherlands) Delta
Mark Coebergh	Scrum-half	27 March 1998 (age 28)	0	(Netherlands) Delta
Amir Rademaker	Scrum-half			(Scotland) DIOK
Hugo Schöller	Scrum-half	11 March 1999 (age 27)	2	(France) Coq Léguevinois
Storm Carroll	Fly-half	13 November 1984 (age 41)	27	(Netherlands) Hilversum
Marc Mistou	Fly-half	28 September 1998 (age 27)	1	(Netherlands) Delta
Mees van Oord	Fly-half	27 April 1999 (age 27)	4	(Netherlands) Delta
Daily Limmen	Centre	22 June 2001 (age 25)	1	(Netherlands) Delta
Oliva Sialau	Centre	1 March 1994 (age 32)	0	(Netherlands) Delta
David Weersma	Centre	9 April 1996 (age 30)	12	(Spain) Aparejadores
Bart Wierenga	Centre	26 August 1999 (age 26)	4	(France) Valence Romans
Daan van der Avoird	Wing		2	(Netherlands) Delta
Jort Doornenbal	Wing	3 August 2000 (age 26)	0	(Netherlands) Delta
Jordy Hop	Wing		4	(Netherlands) Eemland
Siem Noorman	Wing			(Netherlands) Haagsche
Te Hauora Campbell	Fullback		1	(Netherlands) Delta

== Georgia ==
On the 26th of February 2021, Maisahvili named a 32-man squad for the Rugby Europe Championship.

Head coach: (Georgia (country)) Levan Maisashvili

Player	Position	Date of birth (age)	Caps	Club/province
Jaba Bregvadze	Hooker	23 April 1987 (aged 33)	62	(France) Agen
Giorgi Chkoidze	Hooker	17 May 1991 (aged 29)	14	(Russia) Lokomotiv Penza
Shalva Mamukashvili	Hooker	2 October 1990 (aged 30)	79	Unattached
Nika Abuladze	Prop	29 October 1995 (aged 25)	0	(Georgia (country)) Qochebi
Beka Gigashvili	Prop	17 February 1992 (aged 29)	19	(France) Toulon
Guram Gogichashvili	Prop	4 September 1998 (aged 22)	18	(France) Racing 92
Giorgi Kharaishvili	Prop	13 February 1999 (aged 22)	0	(France) Racing 92
Giorgi Melikidze	Prop	24 June 1996 (aged 24)	23	(France) Stade Français
Davit Gigauri	Lock	3 April 1994 (aged 26)	7	(France) Tarbes
Lasha Jaiani	Lock	21 April 1998 (aged 22)	7	(England) Wasps
Giorgi Javakhia	Lock	24 September 1996 (aged 24)	5	(France) Aurillac
Nodar Tcheishvili	Lock	13 November 1990 (aged 30)	27	(Georgia (country)) AIA Kutaisi
Mikheil Gachechiladze	Back row	24 December 1990 (aged 30)	13	(Russia) Enisei-STM
Tornike Jalaghonia	Back row	12 December 1998 (aged 22)	5	(France) Biarritz
Beka Saghinadze	Back row	29 October 1998 (aged 22)	19	(France) Aurillac
Giorgi Tkhilaishvili	Back row	8 April 1991 (aged 29)	60	(Georgia (country)) Batumi
Irakli Tskhadadze	Back row	1 August 1996 (aged 24)	0	(France) Brive
Mikheil Alania	Scrum-half	19 November 2000 (aged 20)	1	(France) Aurillac
Gela Aprasidze	Scrum-half	14 January 1998 (aged 23)	30	(France) Montpellier
Vasil Lobzhanidze	Scrum-half	14 October 1996 (aged 24)	57	(France) Brive
Tedo Abzhandadze	Fly-half	13 June 1999 (aged 21)	21	(France) Brive
Giorgi Babunashvili	Fly-half	15 November 1995 (aged 25)	0	(Georgia (country)) AIA Kutaisi
Lasha Khmaladze	Fly-half	20 January 1988 (aged 33)	85	(Georgia (country)) Batumi
Giorgi Kveseladze	Centre	11 November 1997 (aged 23)	29	(England) Gloucester
Merab Sharikadze (c)	Centre	17 May 1993 (aged 27)	72	Unattached
Sandro Svanidze	Centre	27 October 1998 (aged 22)	1	(Georgia (country)) Armazi
Demur Tapladze	Centre	18 March 2000 (aged 20)	6	(Georgia (country)) Lelo Saracens
Mirian Modebadze	Wing	27 October 1997 (aged 23)	14	(Georgia (country)) AIA Kutaisi
Aka Tabutsadze	Wing	18 August 1997 (aged 23)	8	(Georgia (country)) Lelo Saracens
Alexander Todua	Wing	2 November 1987 (aged 33)	89	(Georgia (country)) Batumi
Soso Matiashvili	Fullback	27 January 1993 (aged 28)	30	(Georgia (country)) Akademia
Davit Niniashvili	Fullback	14 July 2002 (aged 18)	3	(Georgia (country)) Khvamli

== Portugal ==
On the 1st of March 2021, Lagisquet named a 30-man squad for the Rugby Europe Championship.

Head Coach: (France) Patrice Lagisquet

Note: Flags indicate national union for the club/province as defined by World Rugby.

Player	Position	Date of birth (age)	Caps	Club/province
Nuno Mascarenhas	Hooker	18 May 1998 (aged 22)	19	(Portugal) Cascais
Mike Tadjer	Hooker	10 March 1989 (aged 31)	17	(France) Montauban
David Costa	Prop	5 July 1999 (aged 21)	6	(Portugal) Direito
Diogo Hasse Ferreira	Prop	17 October 1996 (aged 24)	14	(France) Dijon
Geoffrey Moïse	Prop	20 August 1991 (aged 29)	1	(France) Pau
Thibault Nardi	Prop	1 August 1997 (aged 23)	0	(France) Blagnac
José Madeira	Lock	19 March 2001 (aged 19)	9	(France) Grenoble
José Rebelo de Andrade	Lock	24 November 1997 (aged 23)	9	(Portugal) Agronomia
Eric dos Santos	Lock	6 May 1993 (aged 27)	15	(France) Anglet
Rafael Simões	Lock	20 June 1991 (aged 29)	8	(Portugal) CDUL
Frederico Couto	Back row	24 April 1993 (aged 27)	2	(Portugal) Benfica
Luigi Dias	Back row	24 February 1998 (aged 23)	0	(France) Dax
João Granate	Back row	21 February 1997 (aged 24)	12	(Portugal) Direito
Manuel Picão	Back row	10 April 1997 (aged 23)	12	(Portugal) Direito
Francisco Sousa	Back row	3 March 1990 (aged 31)	20	(Portugal) Cascais
João Belo	Scrum-half	2 August 1995 (aged 25)	17	(Portugal) CDUL
Théo Entraygues	Scrum-half	16 October 1993 (aged 27)	0	(France) Rumilly
Samuel Marques	Scrum-half	8 December 1988 (aged 32)	8	(France) Pau
Jorge Abecasis	Fly-half	25 May 1997 (aged 23)	10	(Portugal) CDUL
João Lima	Fly-half	28 August 1998 (aged 22)	8	(Portugal) Agronomia
Jerónimo Portela	Fly-half	2 November 2000 (aged 20)	4	(Portugal) Direito
Tomás Appleton (c)	Centre	29 July 1993 (aged 27)	42	(Portugal) CDUL
José Lima	Centre	24 April 1992 (aged 28)	34	(France) Carcassonne
Vasco Ribeiro	Centre	13 October 1997 (aged 23)	13	(Portugal) Agronomia
Antonio Vidinha	Centre	29 December 1997 (aged 23)	15	(Portugal) Cascais
Dany Antunes	Wing	15 September 1997 (aged 23)	7	(France) Massy
Rodrigo Marta	Wing	18 November 1999 (aged 21)	11	(Portugal) Belenenses
Raffaele Storti	Wing	19 December 2000 (aged 20)	4	(Portugal) Técnico
Simão Bento	Fullback	21 June 2001 (aged 19)	2	(Portugal) Agronomia
Nuno Sousa Guedes	Fullback	21 November 1994 (aged 26)	18	(Portugal) CDUP

=== Call-ups ===
On the 8th of March, Duarte Diniz, Anthony Alves, Francisco Fernandes, Duarte Torgal and José Roque were called up to the squad, while Thibault Nardi returned to their club.

On the 19th of March, Loïc Bournonville was called up to the squad, while Nuno Mascarenhas and Luigi Dias returned to their club.

On the 6th of July, João Mateus, Bruno Rocha, Jean Sousa, Thibault de Freitas, Boaventura Almeida, Pedro Rosa, Pedro Lucas, João Freudenthal and Manuel Cardoso Pinto were called up to the squad for the first time this season, while Loïc Bournonville, Geoffrey Moïse, Eric dos Santos, Frederico Couto, José Roque, Francisco Sousa, Vasco Ribeiro, Antonio Vidinha and Simão Bento were not re-called to the national team.

Player	Position	Date of birth (age)	Caps	Club/province
Loïc Bournonville	Hooker	8 August 1993 (aged 27)	1	(France) Rumilly
Duarte Diniz	Hooker	8 November 1995 (aged 25)	20	(Portugal) Direito
Anthony Alves	Prop	23 June 1989 (aged 31)	19	(France) Grenoble
Francisco Fernandes	Prop	6 September 1985 (aged 35)	26	(France) Béziers
João Mateus	Prop	15 July 1990 (aged 30)	3	(Portugal) Coimbra
Bruno Rocha	Prop	28 September 1992 (aged 28)	27	(Portugal) Técnico
Jean Sousa	Lock	7 November 1990 (aged 30)	4	(France) Montauban
Duarte Torgal	Lock	23 December 1997 (aged 23)	8	(Portugal) Direito
Boaventura Almeida	Back row	18 April 2001 (aged 20)	0	(Portugal) Cascais
Thibault de Freitas	Back row	8 January 1992 (aged 29)	12	(Portugal) Benfica
José Roque	Back row	23 November 1999 (aged 21)	4	(Portugal) CDUL
Pedro Rosa	Back row	25 December 1995 (aged 25)	1	(Portugal) Direito
Pedro Lucas	Scrum-half	16 October 2000 (aged 20)	5	(Portugal) Direito
Pedro Bettencourt	Centre	18 November 1994 (aged 26)	20	(France) Oyonnax
Manuel Cardoso Pinto	Fullback	7 April 1998 (aged 23)	14	(France) Narbonne
João Freudenthal	Fullback	28 December 1995 (aged 25)	7	(Portugal) Belenenses

== Romania ==
On the 2nd of March 2021, Robinson named a 36-man squad for the Rugby Europe Championship.

Head Coach: (England) Andy Robinson

Note: Flags indicate national union for the club/province as defined by World Rugby.

Player	Position	Date of birth (age)	Caps	Club/province
Tudor Butnariu	Hooker	12 March 1995 (aged 25)	0	(Romania) Steaua București
Eugen Căpățână	Hooker	18 June 1986 (aged 34)	48	(Romania) Timișoara
Ovidiu Cojocaru	Hooker	19 November 1996 (aged 24)	12	(Romania) Baia Mare
Ionel Badiu	Prop	29 July 1989 (aged 31)	23	(France) Valence Romans
Vasile Bălan	Prop	7 February 1992 (aged 29)	1	(Romania) Steaua București
Costel Burțilă	Prop	14 July 1991 (aged 29)	3	(France) Hyères
Alex Gordaș	Prop	11 May 1994 (aged 26)	22	(France) Stade Niçois
Constantin Pristăviță	Prop	23 May 1993 (aged 27)	44	(Romania) Baia Mare
Alexandru Savin	Prop	12 February 1995 (aged 26)	7	(Romania) Steaua București
Alexandru Țăruș	Prop	9 May 1989 (aged 31)	35	(Italy) Zebre
Marius Antonescu	Lock	9 August 1992 (aged 28)	36	(France) Bourg en Bresse
Marius Iftimiciuc	Lock	13 August 1997 (aged 23)	0	(France) Périgueux
Ionuț Mureșan	Lock	6 October 1994 (aged 26)	9	(Romania) Timișoara
Adrian Moțoc	Lock	11 July 1996 (aged 24)	10	(France) Aurillac
Johannes van Heerden	Lock	9 December 1986 (aged 34)	44	(Romania) Dinamo București
Cristi Boboc	Back row	9 October 1995 (aged 25)	0	(Romania) Tomitanii Constanța
Cristi Chirică	Back row	9 April 1997 (aged 23)	14	(France) Appaméen
André Gorin	Back row	30 November 1987 (aged 33)	30	(France) Bayonne
Mihai Macovei (c)	Back row	29 October 1986 (aged 34)	87	(France) Colomiers
Vlad Neculau	Back row	1 July 1998 (aged 22)	2	(Romania) Timișoara
Dragoș Ser	Back row	4 March 1999 (aged 22)	4	(Romania) Steaua București
Damian Strătilă	Back row	20 July 1996 (aged 24)	0	(Romania) Steaua București
Julien Bartoli	Scrum-half	21 September 1999 (aged 21)	0	(Romania) Steaua București
Gabriel Rupanu	Scrum-half	28 September 1997 (aged 23)	1	(Romania) Timișoara
Florin Surugiu	Scrum-half	10 December 1984 (aged 36)	84	(Romania) Steaua București
Tudor Boldor	Fly-half	29 November 1997 (aged 23)	5	(Romania) Steaua București
Daniel Plai	Fly-half	5 September 1994 (aged 26)	12	(Romania) Steaua București
Alexandru Bucur	Centre	24 April 1994 (aged 26)	4	(Romania) Baia Mare
Cătălin Fercu	Centre	5 September 1986 (aged 34)	109	(Romania) Timișoara
Vlăduț Popa	Centre	27 March 1996 (aged 24)	13	(Romania) Steaua București
Florin Vlaicu	Centre	26 July 1986 (aged 34)	124	(Romania) Steaua București
Ionuț Dumitru	Wing	6 November 1992 (aged 28)	42	(Romania) Steaua București
Nicolas Onuțu	Wing	27 December 1995 (aged 25)	10	(France) Vienne
Stephen Shennan	Wing	7 January 1991 (aged 30)	17	(Romania) Timișoara
Ionel Melinte	Fullback	31 January 1996 (aged 25)	10	(Romania) Timișoara
Paul Popoaia	Fullback	29 May 2000 (aged 20)	0	(Romania) Baia Mare

=== Call-ups ===
On the 9th of March, Alexandru Țiglă was called up to the squad, while Alexandru Țăruș and Marius Antonescu temporarily returned to their club, yet Julien Bartoli permanently returned to their club.

On the 15th of March, Kamil Sobota was called up to the squad to replace Mihai Macovei who will temporarily return to their club while Ionel Badiu, Cristi Chirică and Dragoș Ser returned to their clubs due to injuries.

On the 22nd of March, Florian Roșu and Cosmin Iliuță were called up to the squad along with Cristi Chirică who re-joined the squad while Alex Gordaș, Ionuț Mureșan, Damian Strătilă and Cătălin Fercu returned to their clubs.

On the 18th of October, Florin Bărdașu, Dorin Tică, Bogdan Doroftei, Andrei Toader, Alexandru Alexe, Moa Mua Maliepo, Jason Tomane, Hinckley Vaovasa, Sioeli Lama and Marius Simionescu were called up to the squad for the first time this season while Cristi Chirică was re-called to the national team, whereas Eugen Căpățână, Johannes van Heerden, Kamil Sobota, Alexandru Țiglă and Stephen Shennan were not re-called to the national team.

On the 9th of November, Robert Neagu was called up to the squad while Alex Gordaș, Dorin Tică, Bogdan Doroftei, Alexandru Alexe, Vlad Neculau, Moa Mua Maliepo, Vlăduț Popa and Sioeli Lama returned to their clubs.

Player	Position	Date of birth (age)	Caps	Club/province
Florin Bârdașu	Hooker	23 September 1991 (aged 30)	5	(Romania) Steaua București
Dorin Tică	Prop	6 March 2001 (aged 20)	0	(Italy) Colorno
Bogdan Doroftei	Lock	13 November 1995 (aged 25)	0	(Romania) Steaua București
Florian Roșu	Lock	20 April 1993 (aged 27)	0	(Romania) Baia Mare
Andrei Toader	Lock	17 November 1996 (aged 24)	0	(Romania) Dinamo București
Alexandru Alexe	Back row	26 August 1997 (aged 24)	0	(Romania) Baia Mare
Kamil Sobota	Back row	31 March 1992 (aged 28)	2	(Romania) Steaua București
Alexandru Țiglă	Scrum-half	19 February 1993 (aged 28)	4	(Romania) Baia Mare
Moa Mua Maliepo	Centre	12 May 1996 (aged 25)	2	(New Zealand) College Rifles
Jason Tomane	Centre	4 March 1995 (aged 26)	0	(Romania) Baia Mare
Hinckley Vaovasa	Centre	24 September 1998 (aged 23)	0	(Romania) Steaua București
Sioeli Lama	Wing	21 October 1995 (aged 25)	0	(Romania) Steaua București
Cosmin Iliuță	Wing	2 March 1998 (aged 23)	0	(Romania) Steaua București
Robert Neagu	Wing	20 July 1991 (aged 30)	7	(Romania) Steaua București
Marius Simionescu	Wing	5 September 1997 (aged 24)	14	(Romania) Dinamo București

== Russia ==
On the 17th of February 2021, Jones named a 32-man squad for the Rugby Europe Championship.

Head Coach: (Wales) Lyn Jones

Note: Flags indicate national union for the club/province as defined by World Rugby.

Player	Position	Date of birth (age)	Caps	Club/province
Shamil Magomedov	Hooker	17 April 1987 (aged 33)	5	(Russia) Enisey-STM
Stanislav Sel'skiy	Hooker	2 September 1991 (aged 29)	41	(Russia) Enisey-STM
Magomed Davudov	Prop	22 January 1991 (aged 30)	7	(Russia) Strela Kazan
Kirill Gotovtsev	Prop	17 July 1987 (aged 33)	10	(Russia) Krasny Yar
Evgeny Mishechkin	Prop	27 June 1997 (aged 23)	16	(Russia) Slava Moscow
Valery Morozov	Prop	21 September 1994 (aged 26)	24	(England) Sale Sharks
Vladimir Podrezov	Prop	27 January 1994 (aged 27)	32	(Russia) VVA Podmoskovye
Alexei Skobiola	Prop	8 August 1991 (aged 29)	1	(Russia) Slava Moscow
Stepan Seryakov	Prop	26 September 1997 (aged 23)	0	(Russia) Enisey-STM
Bogdan Fedotko	Lock	22 September 1994 (aged 26)	25	(Russia) Krasny Yar
Alexander Ilin	Lock	7 November 1987 (aged 33)	12	(Russia) Krasny Yar
Andrei Ostrikov	Lock	2 July 1987 (aged 33)	38	(France) Grenoble
German Silenko	Lock	9 August 1995 (aged 25)	1	(Russia) Lokomotiv Penza
Victor Gresev (c)	Back row	31 March 1986 (aged 34)	104	(Russia) Lokomotiv Penza
Roman Khodin	Back row	6 September 1994 (aged 26)	6	(Russia) Strela Kazan
Vladislav Perestyak	Back row	17 October 1995 (aged 25)	1	(Russia) Lokomotiv Penza
Anton Sychev	Back row	5 February 1994 (aged 27)	20	(Russia) Metallurg
Nikita Vavilin	Back row	13 May 1994 (aged 26)	16	(Russia) Slava Moscow
Denis Barabantsev	Scrum-half	25 June 1993 (aged 27)	0	(Russia) Strela Kazan
Alexandr Belosludtsev	Scrum-half	7 February 2001 (aged 20)	1	(Russia) Enisey-STM
Konstantin Uzunov	Scrum-half	19 April 1994 (aged 26)	17	(Russia) Enisey-STM
Ramil Gaisin	Fly-half	26 July 1991 (aged 29)	53	(Russia) Enisey-STM
Alexei Golov	Fly-half	24 January 1992 (aged 29)	0	(Russia) Strela Kazan
Yuri Kushnarev	Fly-half	6 June 1985 (aged 35)	115	(Russia) Krasny Yar
Luc Brocas	Centre	23 September 2001 (aged 19)	1	(France) Narbonne
German Davydov	Centre	10 March 1994 (aged 26)	25	(Russia) VVA Podmoskovye
Kirill Golosnitsky	Centre	30 May 1994 (aged 26)	17	(Russia) VVA Podmoskovye
Vasily Artemyev	Wing	24 July 1987 (aged 33)	94	(Russia) CSKA Moscow
Khetag Dzobelov	Wing	5 July 1998 (aged 22)	2	(Russia) Strela Kazan
Andrei Karzanov	Wing	25 November 1990 (aged 30)	1	(Russia) Lokomotiv Penza
Daniil Potikhanov	Wing	30 November 1999 (aged 21)	4	(Russia) VVA Podmoskovye
Alexandr Budychenko	Fullback	9 September 1997 (aged 23)	11	(Russia) Enisey-STM

=== Call-ups ===
On the 14th of June, Shamil Davudov, Denis Mashkin, Nikita Bekov, Evgeny Elgin, Vadim Zharkov, Artémy Gallo, Stepan Khokhlov, Maxime Féougier, Dmitry Gerasimov, Denis Simplikevich and Nikita Churashov were called up to the squad for the first time this season, while Stanislav Sel'skiy, Kirill Gotovtsev, Stepan Seryakov, Bogdan Fedotko, German Silenko, Roman Khodin, Alexandr Belosludtsev, Khetag Dzobelov, Daniil Potikhanov and Alexey Golov were not re-called to the national team.

On the 6th of July, Viktor Kononov was called up to the squad while German Silenko was re-called to the national team, whereas Andrei Ostrikov, Artémy Gallo and Alexandr Budychenko returned to their clubs.

On the 20th of October, Anton Drozdov, Dmitry Parkhomenko, Alishan Umarov, Ivan Chepraga, Dmitry Gritsenko, Egor Zykov Alexander Ivanov, Pavel Kirillov, Vitaly Klimov, Vitaly Zhivatov, Efim Ryabishchuk and Gleb Farkov were called up to the squad for the first time this season while Artémy Gallo and Roman Khodin were re-called to the national team, whereas Nikita Bekov and Maxime Féougier returned to their clubs, along with Shamil Magomedov, Denis Mashkin, Stepan Seryakov, Evgeny Elgin, German Silenko, Vadim Zharkov, Victor Gresev, Konstantin Uzunov, Ramil Gaisin, Dmitry Gerasimov, Andrei Karzanov, Victor Kononov, Denis Simplikevich and Nikita Churashov, all of who returned to their clubs for the Rugby Europe Super Cup matches.

On the 1st of November, Kirill Gotovtsev, German Silenko Konstantin Uzunov, Ramil Gaisin, Khetag Dzobelov, Andrei Karzanov, Victor Kononov and Daniil Potikhanov were re-called to the squad while Shamil Davudov, Efim Ryabishchuk and Gleb Farkov returned to their clubs.

Player	Position	Date of birth (age)	Caps	Club/province
Shamil Davudov	Hooker	25 April 1995 (aged 26)	0	(Russia) Strela Kazan
Alexander Ivanov	Hooker	4 November 1990 (aged 30)	0	(Russia) VVA Podmoskovye
Denis Mashkin	Hooker	19 February 1997 (aged 24)	0	(Russia) Enisey-STM
Dmitry Parkhomenko	Hooker	2 November 1995 (aged 25)	0	(Russia) VVA Podmoskovye
Alishan Umarov	Hooker	10 November 1999 (aged 21)	0	(Russia) CSKA Moscow
Anton Drozdov	Prop	8 October 1996 (aged 25)	3	(Russia) CSKA Moscow
Evgeny Elgin	Lock	10 March 1987 (aged 34)	31	(Russia) Enisey-STM
Vitaly Klimov	Lock	12 January 1995 (aged 26)	0	(Russia) Enisey-STM
Vadim Zharkov	Lock	2 August 1995 (aged 25)	0	(Russia) Lokomotiv Penza
Igor Zykov	Lock	11 January 1993 (aged 28)	3	(Russia) CSKA Moscow
Nikita Bekov	Back row	4 March 1996 (aged 25)	1	(France) Massy
Ivan Chepraga	Back row	26 June 2000 (aged 21)	0	(Russia) CSKA Moscow
Artémy Gallo	Back row	12 October 2000 (aged 20)	0	(France) Racing 92
Dmitry Gritsenko	Back row	10 June 1992 (aged 29)	0	(Russia) Strela Kazan
Pavel Kirillov	Back row	9 May 1993 (aged 28)	0	(Russia) Slava Moscow
Vitaly Zhivatov	Back row	16 February 1992 (aged 29)	15	(Russia) VVA Podmoskovye
Stepan Khokhlov	Scrum-half	9 May 1998 (aged 23)	0	(Russia) Slava Moscow
Efim Ryabishchuk	Scrum-half	16 March 1999 (aged 22)	0	(Russia) Enisey-STM
Gleb Farkov	Fly-half	15 May 1997 (aged 24)	0	(Russia) Dinamo Moscow
Maxime Féougier	Fly-half	1 January 2001 (aged 20)	0	(France) Nantes
Dmitry Gerasimov	Centre	16 April 1988 (aged 33)	71	(Russia) Enisey-STM
Victor Kononov	Centre	26 May 1996 (aged 25)	3	(Russia) Enisey-STM
Denis Simplikevich	Centre	11 March 1991 (aged 30)	29	(Russia) Enisey-STM
Nikita Churashov	Wing	11 February 1996 (aged 25)	3	(Russia) Enisey-STM
Daniil Potikhanov	Wing	30 November 1999 (aged 21)	4	(Russia) Lokomotiv Penza

== Spain ==
On the 8th of March 2021, Santos named a 32-man squad for the Rugby Europe Championship.

Head Coach: (Spain) Santiago Santos

Note: Flags indicate national union for the club/province as defined by World Rugby.

Player	Position	Date of birth (age)	Caps	Club/province
Marco Pinto Ferrer	Hooker	11 November 1987 (aged 33)	23	(France) Béziers
Vicente del Hoyo	Hooker	15 February 1996 (aged 25)	13	(Spain) El Salvador
Bittor Aboitiz	Prop	5 October 1988 (aged 32)	1	(France) Bédarrides
Andrés Alvarado	Prop	12 October 1989 (aged 31)	2	(Spain) El Salvador
Thierry Futeu	Prop	23 June 1995 (aged 25)	8	(France) Carcassonne
Fernando López (c)	Prop	14 March 1986 (aged 34)	49	(France) Tarbes
Jon Zabala	Prop	26 November 1996 (aged 24)	14	(France) Tarbes
Aníbal Bonan	Lock	10 June 1984 (aged 36)	28	(France) Bagnérais
Kalokalo Gavidi	Lock	29 November 1981 (aged 39)	13	(Spain) VRAC
Manuel Mora	Lock	8 March 1985 (aged 35)	24	(France) Agathois
Victor Sánchez	Lock	20 June 1987 (aged 33)	25	(Spain) El Salvador
David Barrera	Back row	5 July 1989 (aged 31)	39	(France) ASVEL Rugby
Pierre Barthere	Back row	3 June 1989 (aged 31)	16	(France) Castelsarrasin
Brice Ferrer	Back row	12 April 1994 (aged 26)	0	(France) Dax
Matthew Foulds	Back row	27 April 1991 (aged 29)	10	(Spain) Alcobendas
Oier Goia	Back row	16 August 1996 (aged 24)	9	(Spain) Ordizia
Lucas Guillaume	Back row	15 April 1991 (aged 29)	20	(France) Albi
Fréderic Quercy	Back row	6 July 1991 (aged 29)	10	Unattached
Kerman Aurrekoetxea	Scrum-half	4 May 2000 (aged 20)	4	(France) Biarritz
Facundo Munilla	Scrum-half	16 May 1995 (aged 25)	24	(France) Marcquois Rugby
Tomás Munilla	Scrum-half	3 August 1998 (aged 22)	8	(France) Béziers
Bautista Güemes	Fly-half	12 May 1990 (aged 30)	2	(Spain) Barcelona
Gonzalo Vinuesa	Fly-half	13 January 2001 (aged 20)	3	(Spain) Cisneros
Alejandro Alonso	Centre	21 July 1998 (aged 22)	0	(Spain) VRAC
Daniel Barranco	Centre	21 January 1999 (aged 22)	0	(Spain) Barcelona
Álvar Gimeno	Centre	15 December 1997 (aged 23)	20	(France) Béziers
Andrea Rabago	Centre	13 May 1996 (aged 24)	14	(France) Dijon
Jordi Jorba	Wing	8 May 1997 (aged 23)	23	(Spain) Barcelona
Brad Linklater	Wing	16 May 1985 (aged 35)	32	(Spain) Getxo
Pablo Ortiz	Wing	14 August 2000 (aged 20)	0	(Spain) Barcelona
Federico Casteglioni	Fullback	10 August 1990 (aged 30)	27	(Spain) Aparejadores
Charly Malié	Fullback	5 November 1991 (aged 29)	13	(France) Pau

=== Call-ups ===
On the 15th of March, Josh Peters, Gautier Gibbouin, Guillaume Rouet, Manuel Ordas, Fabien Perrin and Richard Stewart were called up to the squad, while Victor Sánchez, David Barrera, Pierre Barthere, Facundo Munilla, Daniel Barranco and Pablo Ortiz returned to their clubs.

On the 22nd of March, Victor Sánchez was re-called up to the squad while Andrea Rabago and Fréderic Quercy returned to their clubs, the latter due to a match suspension.

On the 24th of June, Juan Pablo Guido, Afaese Tauli, Facundo Domínguez, Gabriel Vélez, Facundo Munilla, David Barrios, Diego Periel, Julen Goia Sergio Molinero, J. W. Bell and Guillermo Domínguez were called up to the squad for the first time this season while Fréderic Quercy, Facundo Munilla and Pablo Ortiz were re-called to the national team, whereas Kalokalo Gavidi, Josh Peters, Brice Ferrer, Oier Goia, Gautier Gibouin, Kerman Aurrekoetxea, Guillaume Rouet, Manuel Ordas, Alejandro Alonso, Jordi Jorba, Brad Linklater and Charly Malié were not re-called to the national team.

On the 12th of July, Kalokalo Gavidi, Alejandro Alonso, Daniel Barranco and Jordi Jorba were all re-called up to the squad while Gabriel Vélez, David Barrios, Diego Periel and Julen Goia returned to their clubs.

On the 22nd of October, Pablo Miejimolle, Santiago Ovejero, Bastien Dedieu, Michael Hogg, Luciano Molina, Guillermo Moretón, Javier Carrión, Joan Losada and Gauthier Minguillon were called up to the squad for the first time this season while David Barrera and Brice Ferrer, Kerman Aurrekoetxea and Julen Goia were re-called to the national team, whereas Marco Pinto Ferrer, Vicento del Hoyo, Andrés Alvarado, Thierry Futeu, Aníbal Bonán, Lucas Guillaume, Matthew Foulds, Juan Pablo Guido, Fréderic Quercy, Gonzalo Vinuesa, Alejandro Alonso, Fabien Perrin, Sergio Molinero and Guillermo Domínguez were not re-called to the national team.

On the 26th of October, Kawa Leauma and Jerry Davoibaravi were called up to the squad while Tomas Munilla and Julen Goia returned to their clubs, the latter due to injury.

On the 2nd of November, Alberto Blanco was called up to the squad for the first time this season along with Andrés Alvarado, Thierry Futeu, Aníbal Bonán and Matthew Foulds, all of who were re-called to the squad while Bastien Dedieu, Jon Zabala, David Barrera and Luciano Molina returned to their clubs.

On the 9th of November, Marco Pinto Ferrer, Jon Zabala, Lucas Guillaume, Gautier Gibouin, Tomás Munilla, Guillaume Rouet, Manuel Ordas and Fabien Perrin were re-called to the squad while Alberto Blanco, Brice Ferrer, Kerman Aurrekoetxea, Facundo Munilla, Javier Carrión, Jerry Davoibaravi and Pablo Ortiz returned to their clubs.

On the 10th of December, Gavin van den Berg, Joaquín Domínguez, Joel Merkler and Álex Suarez were called up to the squad for the first time this season along with Facundo Munilla, Gonzalo Vinuesa, Julen Goia and Guillermo Domínguez, all of who were re-called to the squad while Pablo Miejimolle, Andrés Alvarado, Thierry Futeu, Jon Zabala, Aníbal Bonan, Victor Sánchez, Matthew Foulds, Gautier Gibouin, Guillermo Moretón, Tomás Munilla, Manuel Ordas and Fabien Perrin were not re-called to the national team.

Player	Position	Date of birth (age)	Caps	Club/province
Pablo Miejimolle	Hooker	17 January 1995 (aged 26)	2	(Spain) VRAC
Santiago Ovejero	Hooker	11 December 1997 (aged 23)	0	(Spain) Alcobendas
Gavin van den Berg	Prop	10 January 1996 (aged 25)	0	(Spain) Alcobendas
Alberto Blanco	Prop	18 October 1990 (aged 31)	22	(Spain) VRAC
Bastien Dedieu	Prop	18 July 1989 (aged 32)	1	(France) Albi
Joaquín Domínguez	Prop	13 December 1996 (aged 24)	1	(France) Chambéry
Joel Merkler	Prop	25 October 2001 (aged 20)	2	(France) Toulouse
Kawa Leauma	Lock	17 December 1989 (aged 31)	0	(Spain) Ordizia
Josh Peters	Lock	12 October 1995 (aged 25)	8	(France) Dijon
Facundo Domínguez	Back row	4 January 1997 (aged 24)	1	(Spain) Barcelona
Juan Pablo Guido	Back row	23 August 1990 (aged 30)	5	(Spain) Aparejadores
Gautier Gibouin	Back row	24 March 1989 (aged 31)	45	(France) Charente
Michael Hogg	Back row	10 July 1994 (aged 27)	7	(Spain) Barcelona
Luciano Molina	Back row	27 August 1994 (aged 27)	0	(Spain) Alcobendas
Guillermo Moretón	Back row	24 December 2000 (aged 20)	0	(Spain) Cisneros
Álex Suarez	Back row	12 December 1995 (aged 25)	0	(Spain) La Vila
Afaese Tauli	Back row	29 April 1990 (aged 31)	15	(Spain) Santboiana
Gabriel Vélez	Back row	10 July 1997 (aged 23)	0	(Spain) VRAC
Guillaume Rouet	Scrum-half	13 August 1988 (aged 32)	21	(France) Bayonne
Manuel Ordas	Fly-half	21 February 1998 (aged 23)	1	(France) Bayonne
David Barrios	Centre	2 May 1999 (aged 22)	0	(Spain) El Salvador
Javier Carrión	Centre	9 November 1990 (aged 30)	11	(Spain) La Vila
Diego Periel	Centre	18 January 2001 (aged 20)	0	(Spain) Pozuelo
Richard Stewart	Centre	4 November 1990 (aged 30)	16	(Spain) Alcobendas
Jerry Davoibaravi	Wing	12 June 1994 (aged 27)	0	(Spain) La Vila
Julen Goia	Wing	12 December 1991 (aged 29)	32	(Spain) Ordizia
Joan Losada	Wing	20 June 1992 (aged 29)	2	(Spain) Barcelona
Gauthier Minguillon	Wing	3 March 1994 (aged 27)	9	(France) Albi
Sergio Molinero	Wing	4 July 2000 (aged 20)	0	(Spain) Alcobendas
Fabien Perrin	Wing	16 June 1988 (aged 32)	14	(France) Colomiers
J. W. Bell	Fullback	18 January 1990 (aged 31)	4	(Spain) VRAC
Guillermo Domínguez	Fullback	31 January 1997 (aged 24)	4	(Spain) Alcobendas
