= 2024 Liga de Rugby Kaufland season =

Romanian rugby union competition

2024 Liga de Rugby Kaufland
- Countries: Romania
- Date: 13 April 2024 – 8 September 2024

The 2024 Liga Națională de Rugby is the 106th season of the top Romanian rugby union competition operated by the Romanian Rugby Federation. The season started on 13 April 2024 and was set to end on 8 September 2024, with its final to be disputed on the Arcul de Triumf National Stadium.

== Teams ==
Six clubs will compete in the 2024 Liga Națională de Rugby season, in three different groups.

Locations of teams in the 2024 Liga Națională de Rugby.

Team	Manager	Captain	Stadium	Capacity
Dinamo București	(New Zealand) Sosene Anesi	(Romania) Ovidiu Cojocaru	Stadionul Arcul de Triumf	8,207
Steaua București	(Romania) Stefan Acsinte	(Fiji) Eseria Vueti	Stadionul Steaua	31,254
Știința Baia Mare	(Romania) Eugen Apjok	(South Africa) Nicolaas Immelman	Arena Zimbrilor	2,300
Timișoara Rugby	(Romania) Valentin Calafeteanu	(Romania) Eugen Căpățână	Stadionul Gheorghe Rășcanu	1,000
Rapid Rugby	(Romania) Stelian Burcea	(Romania) Razvan Pasnicu	Stadionul Olimpia	1,000
Universitatea Cluj-Napoca	(Romania) Cristian Săuan	(Romania) Toma Mârzac	Stadionul Iuliu Hațieganu	500

== Fixtures & results ==
=== Finals ===
==== 5th place ====
30 August 2024
17:00

CS Rapid Bucuresti(6)	11-16	Universitatea Cluj-Napoca (5)
	Report

Olimpia
Attendance: 250
Referee: Alexandru Nitulescu

==== 3rd place ====
8 September 2024
11:00

Steaua București (4)	36-30	Dinamo (3)
	Report

Stadionul Arcul de Triumf, Bucharest

==== 1st-2nd places ====
8 September 2024
19:00

Baia Mare (2)	21–22	(1) SCM Timișoara
Try: Faka'osilea 24', Mokhoabane 42'; Con: Popoaia (1/2) 43'; Pen: Popoaia (3/3) 8', 16', 35'	Report	Try: Neculau 49' c Con: Rupanu (1/1) 50'; Pen: Rupanu (5/5) 11', 13', 19', 60', 70'

Stadionul Arcul de Triumf, Bucharest
Attendance: 1.200
Referee: Alexandru Ionescu

FB	15	(Romania) Paul Popoaia
RW	14	(Romania) Mihai Lămboiu
OC	13	(Fiji) Abele Atuinasa
IC	12	(Romania) Sione Fakaʻosilea
LW	11	(South Africa) Kefentse Mahlo
FH	10	(New Zealand) Nikau McGregor
SH	9	(Romania) Vlăduț Bocăneț
N8	8	(Georgia (country)) Beka Bitsadze
OF	7	(Romania) Nicolaas Immelman (c)
BF	6	(Romania) Alexandru Alexe
RL	5	(Romania) Ștefan Iancu
LL	4	(Georgia (country)) Mate Dardzulidze
TP	3	(Georgia (country)) Revazi Dugladze
HK	2	(Georgia (country)) Levan Papidze
LP	1	(South Africa) James Scott
Substitutions:
HK	16	(Romania) Robert Irimescu
PR	17	(Romania) Mihai Dico
PR	18	(Georgia (country)) Sandro Zubashvili
FL	19	(Georgia (country)) Nugzar Gelashvili
FH	20	(Romania) Alexandru Harasim
SH	21	(Romania) Alexandru Țiglă
CE	26	(Romania) Jason Tomane
LK	23	(Romania) Florian Roșu
Coach:
(Romania) Eugen Apjok

FB	15	(Namibia) TC Kisting
RW	14	(South Africa) Dylan Schwartz
OC	13	(Romania) Gabriel Pop
IC	12	(Romania) Mihai Graure
LW	11	(Samoa) Joe Perez
FH	10	(Romania) Tudor Boldor
SH	9	(South Africa) Jondré Williams
N8	8	(Romania) Cristi Chirică
OF	7	(South Africa) Keanan Murray
BF	6	(Romania) Kamil Sobota
RL	5	(Romania) Johan van Heerden
LL	4	(Romania) Marcel Rusu
TP	3	(South Africa) Jean Smith
HK	2	(Romania) Ovidiu Cojocaru (c)
LP	1	(Romania) Alexandru Gordaș
Substitutions:
HK	16	(Romania) Sergiu Puescu
PR	17	(Romania) Bogdan Neacșu
PR	18	(Romania) Dorin Tică
FL	19	(South Africa) Etienne Terblanche
WG	20	(South Africa) Damian Bonaparte
FL	21	(Romania) Eduard Cioroabă
LK	22	(Fiji) Sailasa Turagaluvu
FB	23	(Romania) Ovidiu Neagu
Coach:
(New Zealand) Sosene Anesi
