= Continental Club Rugby League =

Annual European rugby union competition

- Sport: Rugby union
- Inaugural season: 2020 (Planned); 2021
- Number of teams: 8
- Nations: Russia; Romania; Germany
- Related competitions: European Rugby Champions Cup; European Rugby Challenge Cup

The Continental Club Rugby League is an annual European rugby union competition organised by the Russian Rugby Federation (RRF). It is the third-tier competition for European clubs behind the European Rugby Challenge Cup and the European Rugby Champions Cup.

== History ==
This competition was created in 2019 after the European Rugby Continental Shield folded just six seasons upon its formation as the qualifying competition for the entry of tier two country teams outside the Premiership Rugby, Top 14 and the Pro14 into the European Rugby Challenge Cup.

The Continental Club Rugby League is planned to be contested between 8 teams; 4 of the best teams from Russia's Rugby Premier League, 3 of the best teams from Romania's SuperLiga and the champions of Germany's Rugby-Bundesliga.

The first and only season was cancelled due to the COVID-19 pandemic.

== Teams ==
Location of teams of the Continental Club Rugby League.
Location of the Krasnoyarsk teams of the Continental Club Rugby League.

| Rugby Premiership | SuperLiga | Rugby-Bundesliga |
| Russia | Romania | Germany |
|---|---|---|
| Enisey-STM; Krasny Yar; VVA-Podmoskovye; Slava Moscow | Baia Mare; Steaua; Dinamo | 1880 Frankfurt |

=== Team details ===
Below is the list of coaches, captains and stadiums for each team.

| Team | Coach | Captain | Stadium | Capacity | Position |
|---|---|---|---|---|---|
| (Germany) 1880 Frankfurt | (Australia) Karl Savimaki | (Germany) Chris Howells | Sportanlage an der Feldgerichtstrasse | 5,000 | Rugby-Bundesliga (1st) |
| (Romania) Baia Mare | (Romania) Eugen Apjok | (Romania) Marius Dănilă | Stadionul Lascăr Ghineţ | 1,000 | SuperLiga (1st) |
| (Romania) Dinamo | (Romania) Cosmin Rațiu | (Romania) Tudorel Bratu | Stadionul Florea Dumitrache | 1,500 | SuperLiga (6th) |
| (Russia) Enisey-STM | (Russia) Alexander Pervukhin | (Latvia) Uldis Saulite | Avangard Stadium; Central Stadium | 2,643; 15,000 | Rugby Premier League (1st) |
| (Russia) Krasny Yar | (Tonga) Josh Taumalolo | (Russia) Yuri Kushnarev | Krasny Yar Stadium; Central Stadium | 3,600; 15,000 | Rugby Premier League (2nd) |
| (Russia) Slava Moscow | (South Africa) Andre Treadou | (Russia) Nikita Medkov | Slava Stadium | 2,500 | Rugby Premier League (3rd) |
| (Romania) Steaua | (Romania) Dănuț Dumbravă | (Romania) Viorel Lucaci | Stadionul Steaua II | 3,000 | SuperLiga (2nd) |
| (Russia) VVA Podmoskovye | (Russia) Pavel Baranovsky | (Russia) Sergey Trishin | Gagarin Air Force Academy stadium | 5,000 | Rugby Premier League (4th) |

== Format ==
=== Competition ===
==== Knock-out stage ====
The eight participant teams from the countries Russia, Romania and Germany will be drawn into a single match to play against one another in a quarter-final format where the winners of their respective matches will advance to the semi-finals of the Continental Club Rugby League while the losers will be eliminated immediately.

Then, the winners of the semi-finals will be placed in a final to contest against each other for the title whereas the losers of the two semi-finals will be competing for the 3rd place final instead.

== See also ==
- European Rugby Champions Cup
- European Rugby Challenge Cup
- Rugby Premier League
- SuperLiga
- Rugby-Bundesliga
