= 2017–18 SuperLiga season =

2017–18 CEC Bank SuperLiga
- Countries: Romania
- Date: 26 August 2017 – 26 May 2018
- Champions: Timișoara Saracens (6th title)
- Runners-up: Știința Baia Mare
- Relegated: Politehnica Iași
- Top point scorer: (Fiji) Taniela Rawaqa (CSM Baia Mare); 105 points
- Top try scorer: (Romania) Răzvan Ailenei (CSM Baia Mare); 10 tries

Official website
- www.super-liga.ro

The 2017–18 SuperLiga (also known as the CEC Bank SuperLiga for sponsorship reasons) is the 104th season of premier club rugby in Romania. The current champions are Timișoara Saracens who managed to defend their title by defeating Știința Baia Mare. Since Politehnica Iași have faced financial issues, they will relegate to Divizia Națională de Seniori which means that both Tomitanii Constanța and Gloria Buzău will replace them next season. Also Timișoara Saracens, the winners of the CEC Bank SuperLiga will participate in the European Rugby Continental Shield.

== Teams ==
Locations of teams in the 2017-2018 SuperLiga.

| Club | City/County | Stadium | Capacity | Head Coach | Captain |
|---|---|---|---|---|---|
| Timișoara Saracens | Timișoara, Timiș | Dan Păltinișanu | 32,972 | (New Zealand) Sosene Anesi | (Romania) Vasile Sorin Rus |
| Universitatea Cluj-Napoca | Cluj-Napoca, Cluj | Cluj Arena | 31,479 | (Romania) Horea Hîmpea | (Romania) Rotar Vlad Bogdan |
| Steaua București | București | Ghencea II | 3,000 | (Romania) Dănuț Dumbravă | (Romania) Viorel Lucaci |
| Dinamo București | București | Florea Dumitrache | 1,500 | (Romania) Cristian Hîldan | (Romania) Laurențiu Melinte |
| Știința Baia Mare | Baia Mare, Maramureș | Lascăr Ghineț (Arena Zimbrilor) | 1,000 | (Argentina) Mario Alejandro Canale | (Georgia (country)) Bidzina Samkharadze |
| CSM București | București | Stadionul Olimpia | 1,000 | (Romania) Eugen Apjok | (Romania) Adrian Ion |
| Politehnica Iași | Iași, Iași | Tepro-Tineretului (Veneția) | 1,000 | (Romania) Cosmin Rațiu | (Romania) Daniel Plai |

== Table ==
This is the regular season league table:

Key to colours
| Advances to Semi-Finals. |
| Relegates to Divizia Naţională de Seniori. |

| | Club | Played | Won | Drawn | Lost | Points for | Points against | Points difference | Bonus points | Points |
|---|---|---|---|---|---|---|---|---|---|---|
| 1 | CSA Steaua București | 12 | 9 | 1 | 2 | 313 | 203 | 110 | 6 | 44 |
| 2 | CSM București | 12 | 8 | 1 | 3 | 373 | 185 | 188 | 8 | 42 |
| 3 | Timișoara Saracens | 12 | 8 | 2 | 2 | 318 | 193 | 125 | 6 | 42 |
| 4 | CSM Știința Baia Mare | 12 | 8 | 0 | 4 | 386 | 194 | 192 | 7 | 39 |
| 5 | CS Dinamo București | 12 | 4 | 1 | 7 | 272 | 322 | –50 | 5 | 23 |
| 6 | CS U Cluj | 12 | 2 | 0 | 10 | 169 | 483 | –314 | 2 | 10 |
| 7 | CS Politehnica Iași | 12 | 0 | 1 | 11 | 95 | 346 | –251 | 0 | –3 |

Semifinals

The semi-finals were held on 19 May 2018.

| 1 | CSA Steaua București | 19 | 20 | CSM Știința Baia Mare |
| 2 | CSM București | 13 | 26 | Timișoara Saracens |

== Knock-out Stage ==
Third place final

Both finals were held on 26 May 2018, one week after the semi-finals.

| 1 | CSA Steaua București | 23 | 22 | CSM București |

First place final

| 1 | CSM Știința Baia Mare | 15 | 21 | Timișoara Saracens |
