= Paul Rousseau =

Paul Rousseau may refer to:

- Paul Emile Rousseau (1929–2001), political figure in Saskatchewan, Canada
- Paul Marc Rousseau (born 1989), Canadian musician

== See also ==
- Paul Rousso (born 1958), American contemporary artist
- Paul Russo (1914–1976), American racecar driver
- Paul A. Russo (born 1943), American diplomat
- Paul Rusu (born 1984), Romanian rugby union player
