= 2021 Cupa României =

107th season of Romania's national rugby union cup

- Countries: Romania
- Date: 3 April 2021 – 27 November 2021

Official website
- rugbyromania.ro

The 2021 Cupa României is the 107th season of Romania's national rugby union cup competition since it inauguration in 1914. In this edition of the Romanian Cup, the number of participating teams has decreased from six teams to five, because of the financial troubles that ACS Tomitanii Constanța have succumbed to, meaning they will not participate in this year`s competition.

== Teams ==
Locations of 2021 Cupa României teams Romania.

Note: Flags indicate national union as has been defined under WR eligibility rules. Players may hold more than one non-WR nationality

Team	Manager	Captain	Stadium	Capacity
Dinamo București	(New Zealand) Sosene Anesi	(Romania) Alexandru Mitu	Stadionul Florea Dumitrache	1,500
Steaua București	(Romania) Dănuț Dumbravă	(Fiji) Eseria Vueti	Stadionul Ghencea II	2,000
Știința Baia Mare	(Romania) Eugen Apjok	(Romania) Marius Dănilă	Stadionul Lascăr Ghineț	1,000
Timișoara Rugby	(Romania) Valentin Calafeteanu	(Romania) Eugen Căpățână	Stadionul Gheorghe Rășcanu	1,000
Universitatea Cluj-Napoca	(Romania) Cristian Săuan	(Romania) Damian Dragoș	Stadionul Iuliu Hațieganu	1,000

== Tables ==
=== Group A ===
Key to colours
Advances to semifinals

Regular Table
	Club	Played	Won	Drawn	Lost	Points for	Points against	Points difference	Bonus points	Points
1	Știința Baia Mare	4	3	0	1	95	38	+57	3	15
2	Rugby Timișoara	4	3	0	1	128	72	+56	2	14
3	Universitatea Cluj	4	0	0	4	32	145	-113	0	0

=== Fixtures & Results ===
==== Round 1 ====
3 April 2021
11:00 EET (UTC+2)

Rugby Timișoara (TBP)	52–15	Universitatea Cluj

Stadionul Gheorghe Rășcanu

==== Round 2 ====
10 April 2021
11:00 EET (UTC+2)

Știința Baia Mare (TBP)	40-10	Rugby Timișoara

Stadionul Lascăr Ghineț

==== Round 3 ====
17 April 2021
14:00 EET (UTC+2)

Universitatea Cluj	10-40	Știința Baia Mare (TBP)

Stadionul Iuliu Hațieganu

==== Round 4 ====
7 August 2021
11:00 EET (UTC+2)

Universitatea Cluj	7-48	Rugby Timișoara (TBP)

Stadionul Iuliu Hațieganu

==== Round 5 ====
14 August 2021
11:00 EET (UTC+2)

Rugby Timișoara	18-10	Știința Baia Mare

Stadionul Gheorghe Rășcanu

==== Round 6 ====
21 August 2021
11:00 EET (UTC+2)

Știința Baia Mare	Cancelled; 5–0	Universitatea Cluj

Stadionul Lascăr Ghineț

=== Group B ===
Key to colours
Advances to semifinals.

Regular Table
	Club	Played	Won	Drawn	Lost	Points for	Points against	Points difference	Bonus points	Points
1	Steaua București	2	2	0	0	43	20	+23	2	10
2	Dinamo București	2	0	0	2	20	43	-23	0	0

=== Fixtures & Results ===
==== Round 1 ====
10 April 2021
11:30 EET (UTC+2)

Steaua București (TBP)	38-20	Dinamo București

Stadionul Ghencea II

==== Round 2 ====
14 August 2021
11:00 EET (UTC+2)

Dinamo București	Cancelled; 0–5	Steaua București

Stadionul Florea Dumitrache

== Semifinals ==
27 August 2021
17:00 EET (UTC+2)

Știința Baia Mare	31-25	Dinamo București

Stadionul Lascăr Ghineţ

28 August 2021
12:00 EET (UTC+2)

Steaua București	16-18	Rugby Timișoara

Stadionul Ghencea II

== 1st Place Final ==
27 November 2021
TBC

TBC	v	TBC

TBC
