= Strătilă =

Strătilă is a Romanian surname. Notable people with the surname include:

- Damian Strătilă (born 1996), Romanian rugby union player
- Sabin Strătilă (born 1995), Romanian rugby union player
- Sorin Strătilă (born 1986), Romanian footballer
