= Doroftei =

Doroftei is a Romanian surname. Notable people with the surname include:

- Bogdan Doroftei (born 1995), Romanian rugby union footballer
- Leonard Doroftei (born 1970), Romanian-Canadian boxer
