= Jack B. Farris =

American military officer (1935–2019)

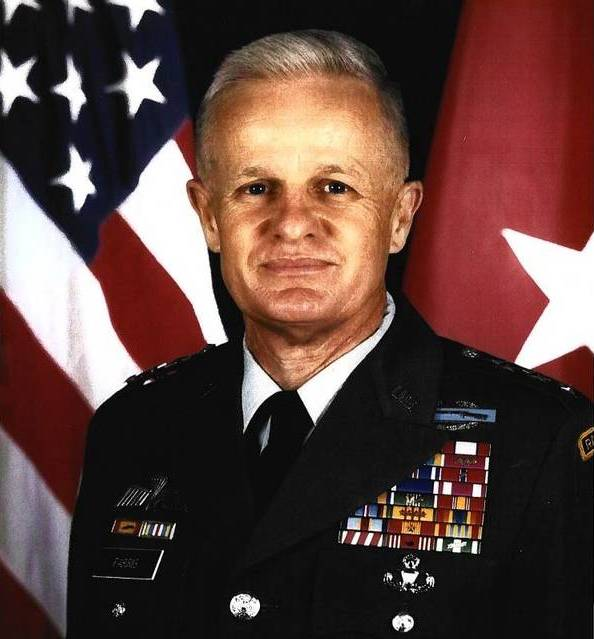
- LtGen Jack B. Farris U.S. Army
- Born: December 5, 1935; Charlotte, North Carolina, U.S.
- Died: December 14, 2019 (aged 84); Charlotte, North Carolina, U.S.
- Military career
- Allegiance: United States
- Branch: United States Army
- Service years: 1958–1991
- Rank: Lieutenant general
- Commands: 2nd Infantry Division; U.S. Army Infantry Training Center; 1st Battalion, 173rd Airborne Brigade
- Conflicts: Vietnam War; United States invasion of Grenada; United States invasion of Panama
- Awards: Distinguished Service Medal; Distinguished Flying Cross; Bronze Star Medal; Purple Heart; Legion of Merit

Jack Brodie Farris (December 5, 1935 – December 14, 2019) was a United States Army lieutenant general who commanded the military ground forces during Operation Urgent Fury, the United States invasion of Grenada in 1983; at the time of his retirement in 1991 he was deputy commander of the United States Pacific Command in Hawaii.

== Life and career ==
A native of Charlotte, North Carolina, he graduated from Myers Park High School. He then went on to receive a bachelor's degree in political science from The Citadel in 1958 and was commissioned as an infantry officer through the school's Army ROTC unit. His early career included assignments as a company commander in the 82nd Airborne Division at Fort Bragg, North Carolina, and combat service in the Vietnam War as a battalion commander and the executive officer of the 173rd Airborne Brigade. He was senior aide-de-camp to the Commanding General of Allied Land Forces Southeastern Europe at İzmir, Turkey, and an instructor and department director at the United States Army Command and General Staff College at Fort Leavenworth, Kansas. He served in the office of the Army Chief of Staff at the Pentagon and was commander of the Infantry Training Center at Fort Benning, Georgia, where he helped stand up the Army's first Advanced Individual Training Brigade.

As a colonel he was chief of staff for the 4th Infantry Division at Fort Carson, Colorado, and after promotion to brigadier general in 1980 moved up to assistant division commander; he next served as deputy director of the Joint Deployment Agency at MacDill Air Force Base, Florida. Upon advancement to major general in 1982 he became deputy commander of the XVIII Airborne Corps; in this capacity he was the senior ground commander of the U.S. military forces who invaded the Caribbean nation of Grenada in October, 1983 in response to a worsening political situation, the presence of Cuban troops and fears over the safety of numerous American citizens which included students at the St. George’s University School of Medicine.

In 1985, he transferred to South Korea as deputy commander for operations of the ROK-US Combined Forces Command, then took over as commanding general of the 2nd Infantry Division. After a tour as chief of staff for the United States Army Training and Doctrine Command at Fort Monroe, Virginia, he was advanced to the rank of lieutenant general and served his final assignment as deputy commander of the United States Pacific Command at Camp H.M. Smith, Hawaii; he retired in 1991 after 33 years of service.

General Farris earned a master's degree in international affairs from Florida State University in 1972 and was a graduate of the United States Army War College, the United States Army Ranger School and the U.S. Marine Corps Amphibious Warfare School; he also attended the John F. Kennedy program on International Security at Harvard University. He earned the Combat Infantryman Badge and Master Parachutist Badge, his military awards include the Distinguished Service Medal, Distinguished Flying Cross, Bronze Star Medal with Oak Leaf Cluster, 3 awards of the Legion of Merit and Purple Heart. He died on December 14, 2019, at the age of 84.
