= Călin Matei =

Romanian politician

Călin-Vasile-Andrei Matei (born April 7, 1966) is a Romanian politician.

In 1990, Matei graduated from Baia Mare's North University, where he studied mining. He served on the Maramureș County Council from 1990 to 2012. He was vice president of the council from 1994 to 1995 and again from 2008 to 2012, serving as president from 1995 to 1996. In 2012, as a candidate of the Social Democratic Party (PSD), he was elected to a Maramureș seat in the Chamber of Deputies. There, he sits on the anti-corruption committee and, from early 2016, on the culture and arts committee.

Matei is married and has two children. He is vice president of the Maramureș County PSD chapter. In 2007, he became president of CSM Baia Mare rugby union club, and since 2013 has been vice president of the Romanian Rugby Federation.
