= Mike Richey =

American football player (born 1947)

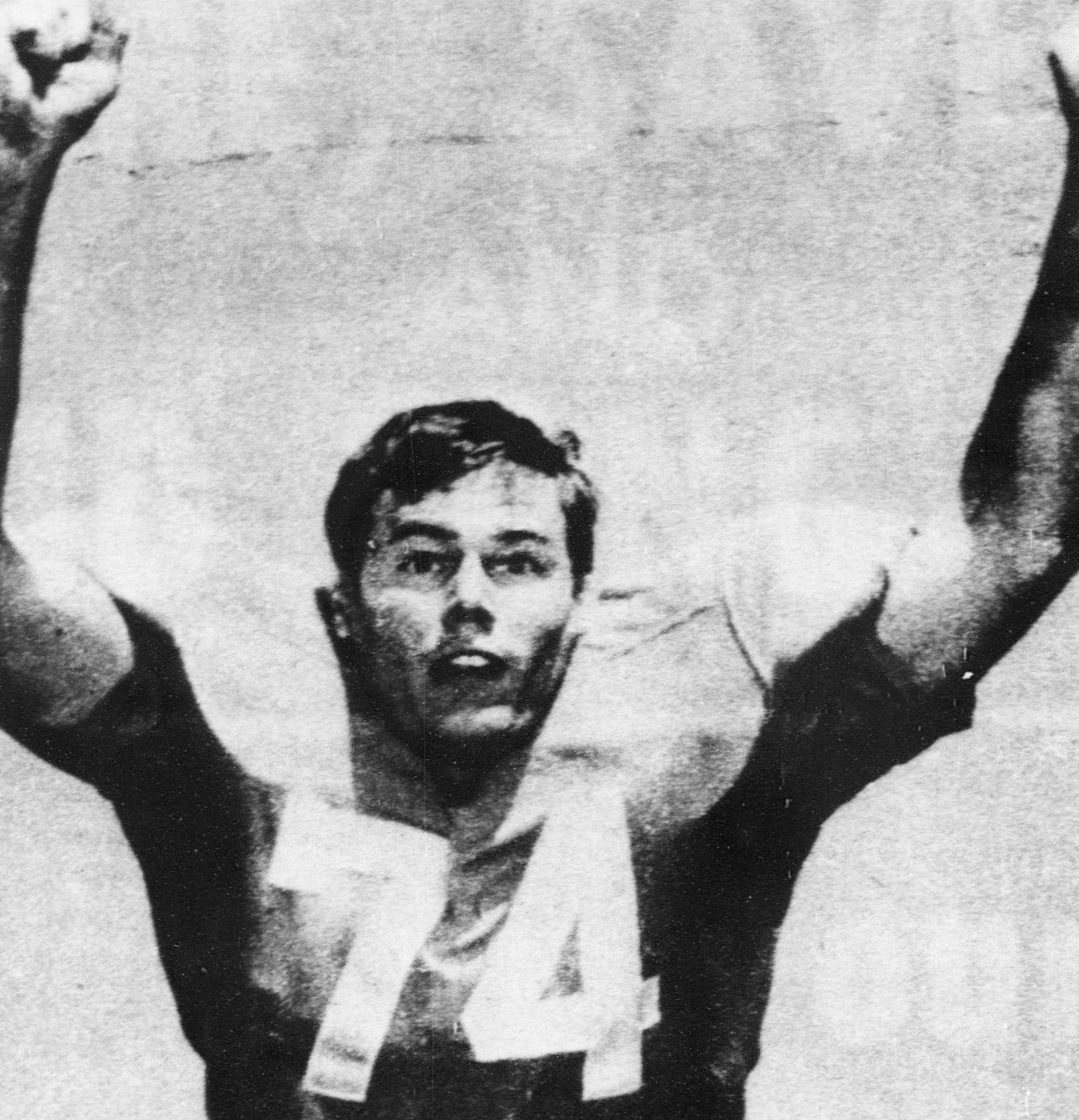
- Richey, circa 1969

Profile
- Position: Offensive tackle

Personal information
- Born: January 30, 1947; Washington, D.C., U.S.
- Died: July 28, 2012 (aged 65); Charlotte, North Carolina, U.S.
- Listed height: 6 ft 4 in (1.93 m)
- Listed weight: 263 lb (119 kg)

Career information
- High school: Myers Park (Charlotte, North Carolina)
- College: North Carolina
- NFL draft: 1969: 4th round, 79th overall pick

Career history
- Buffalo Bills (1969); New Orleans Saints (1970)

Career NFL statistics
- Games played: 19
- Games started: 5
- Stats at Pro Football Reference

James Michael Richey (January 30, 1947 – July 28, 2012) was an American professional football offensive tackle. He played college football for North Carolina from 1966 to 1968 and professional football for the Buffalo Bills in 1969 and the New Orleans Saints in 1970.

== Early life ==
Richey was born in Washington, D.C. in 1947. He attended Myers Park High School in Charlotte, North Carolina, graduating in 1964. He then attended the Hargrave Military Academy in Chatham, Virginia. He played college football for the University of North Carolina Tar Heels football teams from 1966 to 1968.

== Professional football ==
Richey was selected by the Buffalo Bills in the fourth round (79th overall pick) of the 1969 NFL/AFL draft. He became a blocker for O. J. Simpson who the Bills had selected with the No. 1 pick in the 1969 draft. Richey appeared in 14 games for the Bills in 1970 and five games in 1971.

In 1970, Richey was cut by the Bills. He was signed by the New Orleans Saints in November 1970. Richey was cut by the Saints after failing to report for training camp in July 1971

He appeared in a total of 19 games for the Bills and Saints.

== Later life ==
After his football career, Richey was employed in the bond department at First Union National Bank, selling bonds to banks in North Carolina and the southeastern United States. By 1980, at age 34, he was a vice president for First Union. He remained at First Union until 2004 when he joined FTN Financial.

Richey and his wife of 36 years, Pam, had a son Garrett and a daughter Rachel. Richey died in 2012 at age 65.
