= Myers Park High School =

American public school in North Carolina

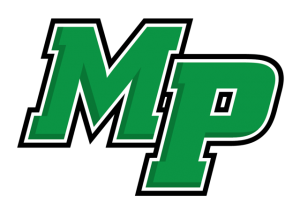

Location
- 2400 Colony Road; Charlotte, North Carolina 28209; United States; 35°10′21″N 80°49′54″W

Information
- Type: Public
- Motto: Make The Park Your Own
- Established: 1951 (75 years ago)
- School district: Charlotte-Mecklenburg Schools
- CEEB code: 340680
- Principal: Robert Folk
- Teaching staff: 154.09 (on an FTE basis)
- Grades: 9–12
- Enrollment: 3,225 (2024–2025)
- Student to teacher ratio: 20.93
- Campus type: Large campus
- Colors: Kelly green, White, and Black
- Athletics: NCHSAA 8A
- Athletics conference: Greater Charlotte 7A/8A
- Nickname: Mustangs
- Rival: South Mecklenburg High School
- Newspaper: The Hoofprint myersparkhoofprint.com
- Website: www.cmsk12.org/myersparkHS

Myers Park High School is a public high school in Charlotte, North Carolina. It serves grades 9–12, and is a part of the Charlotte-Mecklenburg Schools district.

== History ==
Myers Park High School opened in 1951. The school has a 62-acre campus with 13 buildings.

== Athletics ==
Myers Park High is a member of the North Carolina High School Athletic Association (NCHSAA) and is classified as a 8A school in the Greater Charlotte 7A/8A conference. The team name is the "Mustangs" and the school colors are kelly green, white, and black.

== Notable alumni ==
- Graham T. Allison Jr., American political scientist and professor at the John F. Kennedy School of Government at Harvard University
- Rick Arrington, NFL quarterback
- Seth Avett, musician and founding member of the American folk-rock band The Avett Brothers
- Jordan Bly, professional football player
- Ben Browder, actor, writer, and film director
- Heather Childers, television news anchor
- Jim Crockett Jr., professional wrestling promoter; ran Jim Crockett Promotions from 1973 to 1988
- Jack B. Farris, United States Army Lieutenant general
- Omar Gaither, NFL linebacker
- Phillip Goodrum, professional soccer player
- Lauren Holt, actress and comedian, former Saturday Night Live cast member
- Richard Hudson, United States Representative for North Carolina's 9th congressional district
- Anna Kooiman, news anchor and television panelist
- Drake Maye, NFL quarterback for the New England Patriots
- Dan McCready, American entrepreneur and political candidate
- Ravi Patel, actor
- Mike Richey, former NFL offensive lineman
- Jake Robbins, MLB pitcher
- Paul Rousso, contemporary artist
- John Sadri, professional tennis player
- Tony Suarez, professional soccer player
- Robert Woodard, college baseball head coach
- Haywoode Workman, former NBA player, current NBA referee
- Rodney Dunham, Notre Dame defensive end
