= Răzvan Ailenei =

Romania international rugby union player

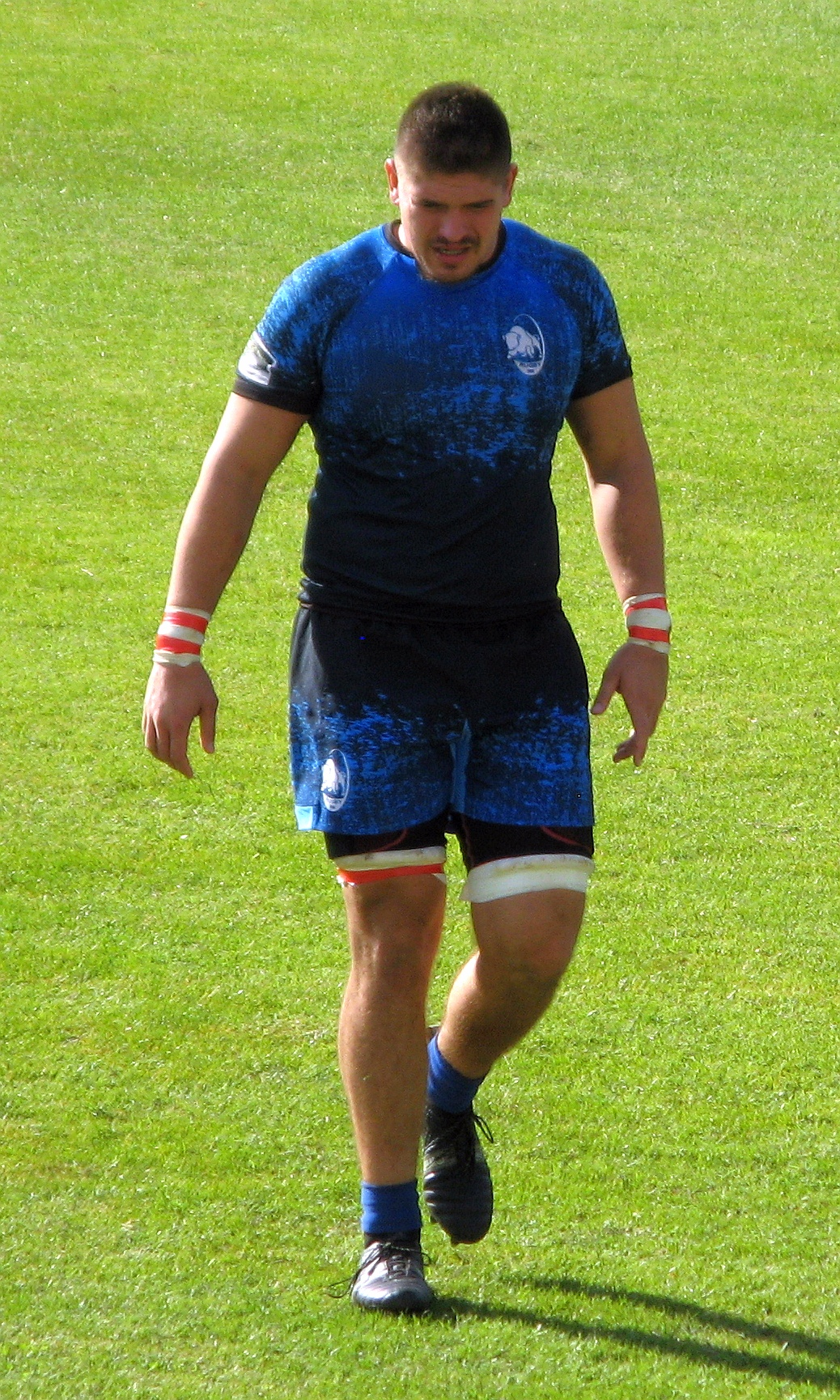
- Răzvan Ailenei playing for CSM Baia Mare in 2017
- Full name: Răzvan Marcel Ailenei
- Born: 4 February 1992 (age 34) Romania
- Height: 1.90 m (6 ft 3 in)
- Weight: 110 kg (17 st 5 lb; 240 lb)

Rugby union career
- Position: Number 8
- Current team: CSM Baia Mare
Senior career
Years	Team	Apps	(Points)
2012–2013	Universitatea Cluj	3	(5)
2013	CSM Baia Mare	3	(0)
2013–2014	Universitatea Cluj	6	(10)
2014–	CSM Baia Mare	21	(35)
- Correct as of 7 October 2017
Provincial / State sides
Years	Team	Apps	(Points)
2013–15	București Wolves	5	(0)
- Correct as of 7 October 2017
International career
Years	Team	Apps	(Points)
2016–	Romania	3	(0)
- Correct as of 7 October 2017

Răzvan Marcel Ailenei (born 4 February 1992) is a Romanian rugby union football player. He plays as a Number 8 for professional SuperLiga club CSM Baia Mare.

== Club career ==
Before joining CSM Baia Mare, Răzvan Ailenei played for Universitatea Cluj.

== International career ==
Ailenei also plays for Romania's national team, the Oaks, making his international debut at the 2016 World Rugby Nations Cup in a match against the Welwitschias.
