= Mihai Lămboiu =

Romania international rugby union player

- Full name: Mihai Lămboiu
- Born: 25 July 1997 (age 29) Mangalia, Romania
- Height: 1.79 m (5 ft 10 1/2 in)
- Weight: 85 kg (13 st 5 lb; 187 lb)

Rugby union career
- Position(s): Wing, centre
- Current team: Știința Baia Mare
Youth career
- 2010–12: A.C.S. Litoral
Senior career
| Years | Team | Apps | (Points) |
| 2012–16 | Tomitanii Constanța | | |
| 2016–Present | Știința Baia Mare | 15 | (5) |
- Correct as of 11 March 2020
International career
| Years | Team | Apps | (Points) |
| 2019–Present | Romania | 2 | (0) |
- Correct as of 11 March 2020

Mihai Lămboiu (born 25 July 1997) is a Romanian rugby union player. He plays as a wing for professional SuperLiga club Știința Baia Mare. He can also play as a centre.

== Club career ==
Mihai Lămboiu started playing rugby as a youth for a local Romanian club based in Mangalia, A.C.S. Litoral. After just one year and a half he was signed by Divizia Națională side, ACS Tomitanii Constanța. In 2016 he was signed by SuperLiga side, Știința Baia Mare, where he still plays.

== International career ==
Lămboiu is also selected for Romania's national team, the Oaks, making his international debut in a test match against the Los Cóndores on 8 June 2019.
