= Nicolaas Immelman =

Romania international rugby union player

- Full name: Jacob Nicolaas Olivier Immelman
- Born: 18 June 1993 (age 33) Upington, South Africa
- Height: 1.93 m (6 ft 4 in)
- Weight: 114 kg (251 lb; 17 st 13 lb)
- School: Grey College, Bloemfontein
- University: University of Pretoria

Rugby union career
- Position: Flank
- Current team: CSM Baia Mare
Youth career
- 2009: Griquas
- 2010–2011: Free State Cheetahs
- 2012–2014: Blue Bulls
Senior career
Years	Team	Apps	(Points)
2014–2017	Free State XV	3	(0)
2017	Free State Cheetahs	5	(0)
2018	SWD Eagles	16	(10)
2019–present	CSM Baia Mare	0	(0)
- Correct as of 3 November 2018

Jacob Nicolaas Olivier Immelman (born 18 June 1993) is a South African rugby union player for Romanian SuperLiga side CSM Baia Mare. His regular position is flank.
