= Sabin Strătilă =

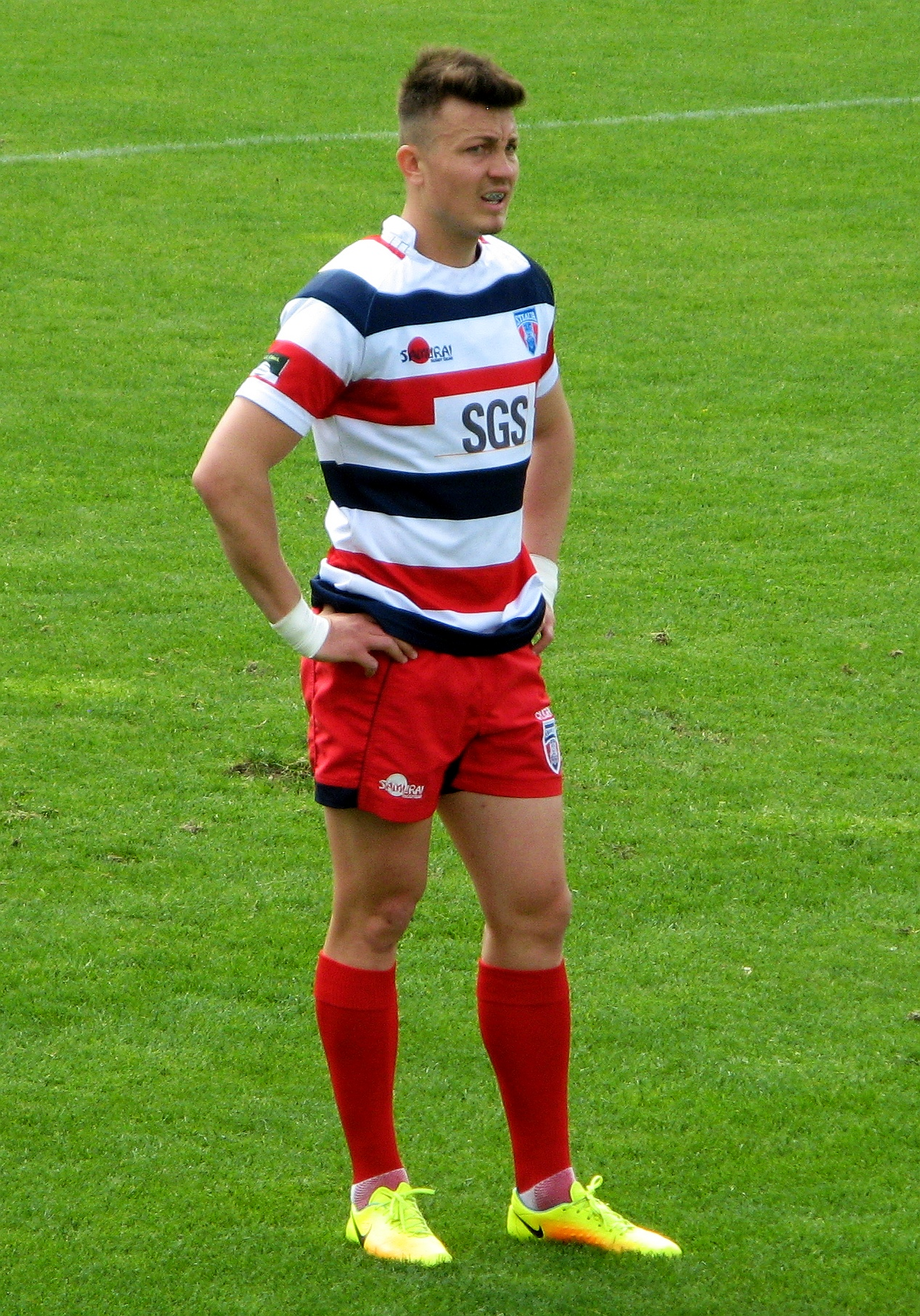
- Sabin Strătilă playing for Steaua in 2017
- Full name: Sabin-Florin Strătilă
- Born: 27 March 1995 (age 31) Constanța, Romania
- Height: 1.86 m (6 ft 1 in)
- Weight: 89 kg (196 lb)
- Notable relative: Damian Strătilă (brother)

Rugby union career
- Position: Fullback
- Current team: Steaua București
Senior career
Years	Team	Apps	(Points)
2014–	Steaua București	15	(20)
2014–15	București Wolves	0	(0)
- Correct as of 23 April 2016
International career
Years	Team	Apps	(Points)
2015–	Romania	4	(6)
- Correct as of 10 June 2017

Sabin-Florin Strătilă (born 27 March 1995) is a Romanian rugby union full-back who plays for Steaua București and Romania. Strătilă made his debut for the Romania in 2015 and was part of the squad at the 2015 Rugby World Cup.

== Personal life ==
Sabin-Florin is the older brother of fellow Steaua teammate Damian Strătilă.
