= Marius Dănilă =

Romania international rugby union player (born 1987)

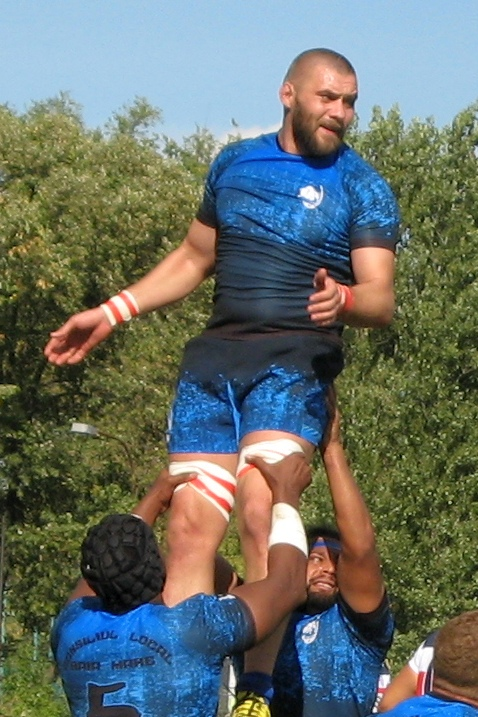
- Marius Dănilă playing for CSM Baia Mare in 2017
- Full name: Marius Octavian Dănilă
- Born: 8 March 1987 (age 39) Suceava, Romania
- Height: 1.93 m (6 ft 4 in)
- Weight: 110 kg (17 st 5 lb; 240 lb)

Rugby union career
- Position(s): Lock, second row
- Current team: Știința Baia Mare
Youth career
- CSȘ Gura Humorului
Senior career
Years	Team	Apps	(Points)
2006–Present	Știința Baia Mare	63	(30)
- Correct as of 9 March 2020
Provincial / State sides
Years	Team	Apps	(Points)
2011–12	București Wolves	4	(0)
- Correct as of 9 March 2020
International career
Years	Team	Apps	(Points)
2012–Present	Romania	1	(5)
- Correct as of 9 March 2020

Marius Octavian Dănilă (born 8 March 1987) is a Romanian rugby union player. He plays as a lock for professional SuperLiga club Știința Baia Mare.

== Club career ==
Before joining Știința Baia Mare in 2006, Dănilă played as a youth for a local Romanian club based in Gura Humorului, namely CSȘ Gura Humorului. On 29 July 2006 he started his professional journey joining SuperLiga side, CSM Știința Baia Mare following the advice of Romanian international Mihai Macovei. In 2011 he was selected to play Bucharest side, București Wolves, a state team assembled to play in the European Rugby Challenge Cup.

== International career ==
Dănilă is also selected for Romania's national team, the Oaks, making his international debut during the 2012 season of European Nations Cup First Division in a match against Ukraine on 31 March 2012.

== Honours ==
Știința Baia Mare

- SuperLiga: 2008–09, 2010, 2011, 2014, 2018–19
- Romanian Cup: 2010, 2012
- King's Cup (Cupa Regelui): 2016, 2017
