= Roman Khodin =

Russian rugby union player

- Born: 6 September 1994 (age 32)
- Height: 1.91 m (6 ft 3 in)
- Weight: 99 kg (15 st 8 lb; 218 lb)

Rugby union career
- Position: Lock
- Current team: Kuban
Senior career
Years	Team	Apps	(Points)
- Kuban
- Correct as of 14 September 2019
International career
Years	Team	Apps	(Points)
2018–present	Russia	4	(0)
- Correct as of 14 September 2019

Roman Khodin (born 6 September 1993) is a Russian rugby union player who generally plays as a lock represents Russia internationally.

He was included in the Russian squad for the 2019 Rugby World Cup which is scheduled to be held in Japan for the first time and also marks his first World Cup appearance.

== Career ==
He made his international debut for Russia against Namibia on 10 November 2018.
