= Mihai Dico =

Romanian rugby union player

- Born: 16 August 1987 (age 39)
- Height: 1.87 m (6 ft 1 1/2 in)
- Weight: 100 kg (220 lb)

Rugby union career
- Position: Prop
Senior career
Years	Team	Apps	(Points)
2010–15	București Wolves	11	(0)
- Correct as of 24 January 2015
Provincial / State sides
Years	Team	Apps	(Points)
2011	Steaua București	5	(0)
2012–	Baia Mare	46	(15)
- Correct as of 5 December 2015
International career
Years	Team	Apps	(Points)
2015–	Romania	3	(0)
- Correct as of 13 February 2016

Mihai Dico (born 16 August 1987) is a Romanian rugby union player. He plays in the prop position for amateur SuperLiga club Baia Mare and București based European Challenge Cup side the Wolves. He also plays for Romania's national team the Oaks.
