= Robert Irimescu =

Romania international rugby union player

Rob Irimescu
- Full name: Robert Irimescu
- Born: 1 March 1996 (age 30) New York City, New York, U.S.
- Height: 183 cm (6 ft 0 in)
- Weight: 105 kg (231 lb; 16 st 7 lb)
- School: Xavier High School
- University: Pennsylvania State University

Rugby union career
- Position(s): Hooker, Backrow
- Current team: West Harbour RFC
Youth career
- 2010–2014: Xavier High School
- 2014–2019: Penn State Nittany Lions
Senior career
Years	Team	Apps	(Points)
2019–2022	New York Athletic Club RFC	??	(??)
2020–2021	Rugby New York	13	(0)
2022	Old Glory DC	16	(10)
2023–2025	CSM Știința Baia Mare	16	(25)
2023–2024	→ Romanian Wolves	5	(5)
2025–	West Harbour		
International career
Years	Team	Apps	(Points)
2018-2019	USA Collegiate All-Americans	3	(0)
2023	Romania A	1	(0)
2023–	Romania	12	(5)
- Correct as of 6 April 2025

Robert "Rob" Irimescu (born 1 March 1996) is an American-born Romanian professional rugby union player who currently plays for the Australian club West Harbour RFC and the Romanian national team.

== Club career ==
After playing for five years at Pennsylvania State University, upon his graduation Irimescu would sign for Rugby New York, after spending time with amateur side New York Athletic Club.

=== Rugby New York ===
He joined his hometown side at the end of 2019, he went on to make his debut for the Major League Rugby side in the first round of the 2020 season, coming off the bench against the New England Freejacks.

=== Old Glory DC ===
Signing for rival side Old Glory DC in 2022, he went on to feature in all 16 of Old Glory's matches, being named in the Starting XV for 11 of them. He signed for CSM Știința Baia Mare to help his international ambitions.

=== CSM Știința Baia Mare ===
He joined CSM Știința Baia Mare in 2023 making his debut against CSA Steaua București.

== International career ==
His first appearance was for Romania A against Italy A in 2023, before going on to make his debut for the national side against Poland in the 2023 Rugby Europe Championship, coming off the bench to score a try. He played in the following 2 Rugby Europe Matches against Belgium and Portugal, coming off the bench in his alternate position, as a flanker in both.

He was named in the Romanian squad for the 2023 Rugby World Cup warmups. He eventually came off the bench against Georgia.

He went on to be named in the final 33-Man Roster, playing in the 2023 Rugby World Cup. On September 17th, he came off the bench against South Africa, making his World Cup Debut. A few weeks later he cracked the first XV for the first time against Scotland, and closed out his World Cup Campaign by coming off the bench against Tonga.

In 2024, he continued his campaign for the Oaks, by being selected in the 2024 REC Squad, where he featured in 3 matches. He went on to earn his 10th cap, in his final match against Spain.

In the summer of 2024, he was selected to play against the United States and Canada. He played in both games, coming off the bench. Irimescu went on to defeat his home nation in Chicago, winning the Pershing Cup, 22–20 on July 5th, 2024.

== Personal life ==
Born in New York to Romanian parents, Nicoleta and Gabriel Irimescu, who both come from Constanța. His father grew up playing rugby in Constanța. He frequently visited Constanța every summer. Although he lived in the United States his whole life, he moved to Romania in January 2023 to help his international ambitions.

He graduated from Penn State with a Master’s Degree in Accounting, a Bachelor’s in Finance, and a Bachelor’s in Accounting.
