= Paul Rousso =

American artist (born 1958)

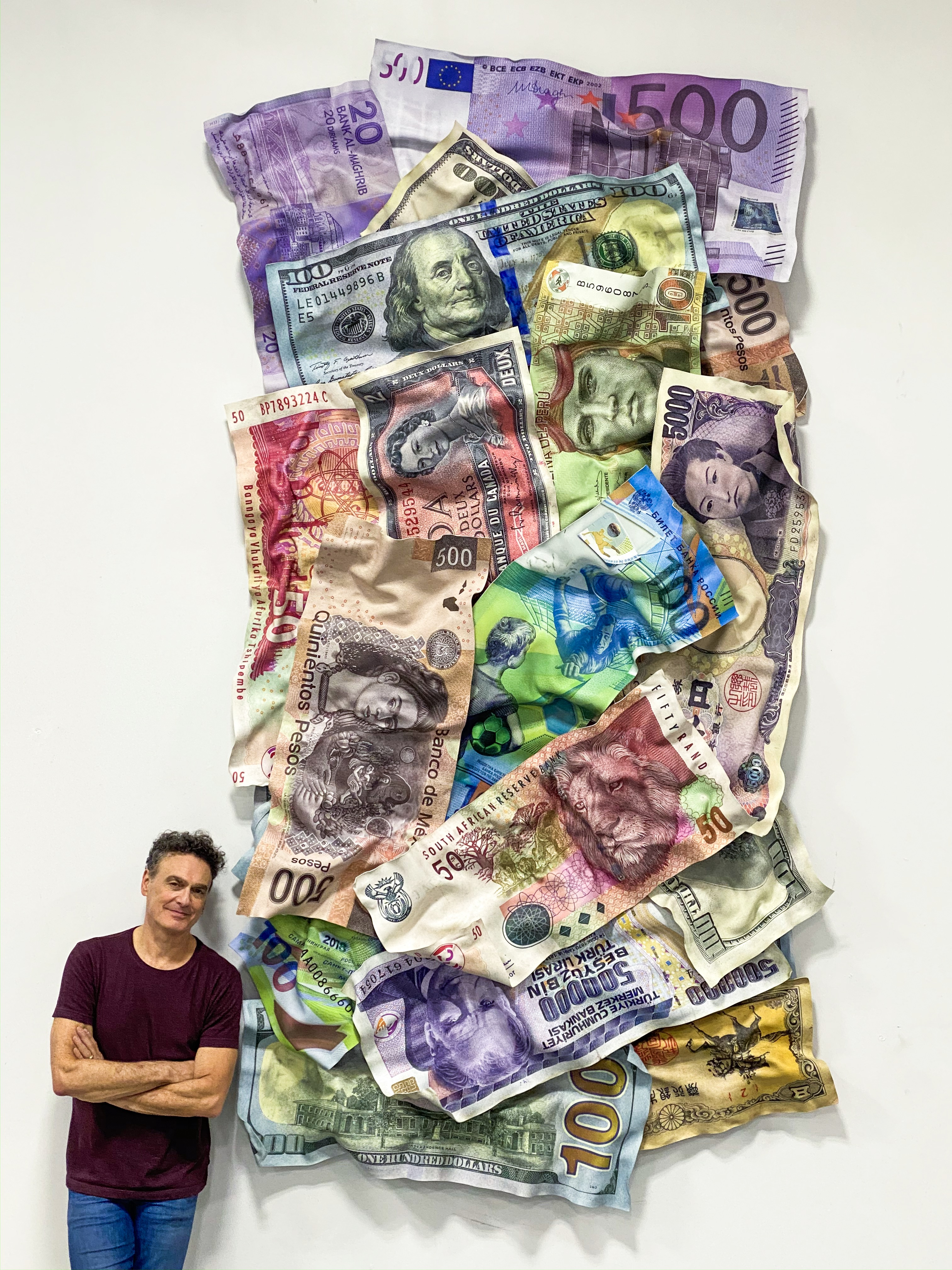
- Rousso, pictured with Vertical Currency, 2020
- Born: December 8, 1958 (age 67); Charlotte, North Carolina
- Education: Cleveland Institute of Art, Cleveland, OH; California College of the Arts, San Francisco, CA
- Known for: fine artist
- Website: paulrousso.com

Paul Rousso (born 1958) is an American contemporary artist. Born in Charlotte, NC. Rousso's works are described as 21st century Pop Art dealing in ephemera and artifacts of an analog culture that is quickly disappearing into the past.

== Early life ==
The artist was born to Doris and Al Rousso in 1958 and raised in Charlotte, NC. He was the youngest of four boys. His father was a jeweler and Charlotte City Council member. His grade school was Cotswold Elementary School where he first realized his life would be in the arts, thanks to the encouragement of a first-grade teacher, Betsy Whitman. Rousso would attend Carmel Academy for middle school, and in the ninth grade, he learned that the neighborhood his family had moved into was in the district of Myers Park High School, which Rousso had recently learned had an award-winning art teacher, Dean Barber. Rousso told his mother that he would be attending Myers Park High School and his mother insisted that he would not and would finish his education at Carmel Academy. As Rousso recounts it, he intentionally caused a class disturbance, sufficient to get him expelled from the school, leaving Myers Park High School as the family's only option for high school. He graduated in 1977 from Myers Park High School as the most award-winning art student in the school's history. Rousso would credit Barber with instilling in him a lifelong determination and a self-critical eye.

== Education ==
Rousso would enter the five-year BFA program at the Cleveland Institute of Art in 1978. It was in Cleveland that Rousso's foundation in design, composition and color were established and guided by his instructor Julian Stanczak he learned he wasn't nearly as good as he thought he was. During preparations for final exams, Rousso got his thumb stuck in a table saw and nearly severed it completely off. A visiting physician who specialized in reattaching severed limbs was teaching at Case Western Reserve University School of Medicine and brought his entire class into the operating room, using Rousso as a case study of how to reattach the dorsal forearm muscles of the thumb. The following year, Rousso would apply for admission into the Atlanta College of Art and move to Atlanta. A high school friend who had attended the Atlanta College of Art the prior year came to visit Rousso in Atlanta and advised that he would do better at the school he was currently attending in California, the California College of Arts, which at the time was called the California College of Arts and Crafts, located in Oakland. Rousso changed schools on that advice and graduated from the California College of Arts with a BFA in 1981.

During Rousso's second year in California he briefly lived in New York City, working for Jan Stanbury on the redesign of Robert De Niro's loft at 110 Hudson Street.

== Early career ==
After receiving his BFA, Rousso would move to Los Angeles and attempt to establish himself as a freelance illustrator. In the evenings Rousso would take long walks through his neighborhood and it was on one such night that he heard the familiar on-and-off sound of a compressor. Following the sound, he came upon a man in his garage, working on a large-scale work in airbrush. Seeing that the fellow was having a great deal of difficulty with the airbrush, Rousso lent him his own which allowed him to complete the work which was due the following morning. As thanks, Rousso was introduced to Ron Strang, head of the scenic art department at Burbank Studios, the old Warner Brothers lot in Studio City. Strang presented Rousso with a DeVilbiss spray gun, challenging him to take it apart and put it back together. Surprised that he quickly could do so, Rousso was hired on the spot. He would go on to work briefly as a scenic artist for Warner Brothers, where he worked on films including Annie and Blue Thunder, as well as TV shows including Fantasy Island, Maverick, and Falcon Crest. Rousso would credit the experience with teaching him more about making art than all of his college studies and making him fearless with scale.

While in Los Angeles, Rousso began photographing and drawing women, which he assembled into a portfolio aimed at the fashion illustration market. Thinking the market for that kind of work was stronger in New York City than Los Angeles, Rousso moved to Manhattan in 1982 where he was introduced to Geraldine Onorato, who was one of the staff art directors at Bloomingdale's. As a freelancer under her direction, Rousso did a series of Bloomingdale ads that would appear in the New York Times. When Onorato changed jobs and went to Grey Advertising, she continued to hire Rousso to illustrate her ideas for ad campaigns. Eventually Grey Advertising put Rousso on staff to turn everyone's ideas into composite drawings. Onorato left Grey and Rousso assumed her position as art director in 1984. For several years, he would produce national and international ads for Revlon. One of the more widely seen campaigns during that time was a 1985 Revlon ad featuring Joan Collins with the tagline "Never met a Scoundrel I didn't like", written by Alice Erickson. The photograph of Collins was by Matthew Rolston and photographed in black and white. The black and white ad, with the Scoundrel Musk Perfume product printed in color, became trend-setting.

In the summer of 1987, while visiting a friend in Paris and visiting the Musée d'Orsay, Rousso found himself standing in front of Édouard Manet's The Fifer and decided that his career going forward would be as a fine artist.

In 1989, the artist would return to his hometown of Charlotte and dedicate himself to creating works of art. In 1995, Rousso was the first artist named to the Charlotte Business Journal's Forty Under Forty and would have work on permanent display at the Charlotte Convention Center and the Charlotte Aquatic Center. In 2005 Rousso was the only artist privately awarded a commission to produce six different pieces of art for the then-new Bobcats Basketball Arena, now known as the Spectrum Center.

In 2009 the artist was commissioned to create the Children's Holocaust Memorial Sculpture at the Levine Jewish Community Center in Charlotte, NC. The work would not be completed and dedicated until 2011 and since that time it has been covered by thousands of ceramic butterflies created by children.

Up until as late as 2005, Rousso worked primarily on canvas, creating works based on collage as well as works created on wood panels, in which the works featured books, compressed and folded onto the surface.

== Later career ==
In 2010 Rousso gained access to a new digital printing technology that employed a heat-to-print method on sheets of vinyl up to 4-by-8 feet. He realized these vinyl prints could then be applied directly to plexiglass, which could then be heated and sculpted. With these innovations, Rousso was able to create his first currency piece, a one hundred dollar bill, measuring approximately six feet by four. The currency piece was originally produced as personal work and Rousso left it to languish on his studio floor for months, until a friend saw it and suggested that if he could hang it on the wall, he might have something. Not imagining the work as a wall piece the artist devised a way to hang it and had it photographed. The photograph was posted to Facebook by his wife, Joy, with the comment "My husband finally learned how to make big money". An artist associate Cecil Touchon saw it and sent it to his gallerist in Miami, Robert Fontaine. Fontaine called Rousso and told him that if he could deliver a couple to Miami within the week, he would show them at SCOPE Art Show. Rousso delivered five works of sculpted currency and the Robert Fontaine Gallery would be the first to display Rousso's work at a major art fair in 2011.

Beyond currency, Rousso would expand his subject matter to include outsized candy wrappers, newspapers, magazines, cereal boxes and other familiar paper-based objects.

In 2013, Rousso created his largest single installation to date, measuring 30 feet by 9 feet titled November 1st, which assembled 80 enlarged candy wrappers, many of which the artist was able to obtain and scan through the help of candy historian Jason Liebig. November 1st would be displayed at ArtPrize in Grand Rapids, Michigan and be noted by the Battle Creek Enquirer as one of the top 12 works on exhibit. In 2014, The Greensboro Children's Museum acquired a 16 foot by 8 foot work by the artist titled A Piece for Pop, which contained an assemblage of 26 sheets of sculpted plexiglass.

In 2015 the Italian publisher Libri Linea Grafica Duck Edizioni released a book on the artist titled The Art of Flat Depth, written by Tom Patterson.

From 2015 to 2019 Rousso would be represented at Art Miami by Smith Davidson Gallery, as well as other art fairs around the world.

== Solo exhibitions ==
- Flat Depth, Smith Davidson Gallery, Amsterdam, Netherlands, 2020
- A Classic Love Letter, Proyecto Gallery, Mexico City, Mexico, 2019
- Paul Rousso, Galerie de Bellefeuille, Toronto, Canada, 2018
- Paul Rousso: Recent Works, Lanoue Gallery, Boston, MA, 2018
- Paul Rousso, Rarity Gallery, Mykonnos, Greece, 2017
- Paul Rousso: Recent Wall Sculptures, George Billis Gallery, Los Angeles, CA, 2014

== Working process ==
High-resolution scans of the paper objects, such as currency, candy wrappers, and magazine and newspaper pages are made and then enlarged and retouched in Photoshop. The scans are then printed on sheets of vinyl up to 4-by-8 feet. The vinyl print is then applied directly to plexiglass. Once complete, the plexiglass is then heated to temperatures up to 320 degrees. Once hot, the plexiglass is malleable for 20 to 30 seconds during which time the sheet is manipulated by the artist. Final alterations to the plexiglass are then made with a blowtorch.
