= Daniel Plai =

Romanian rugby union player

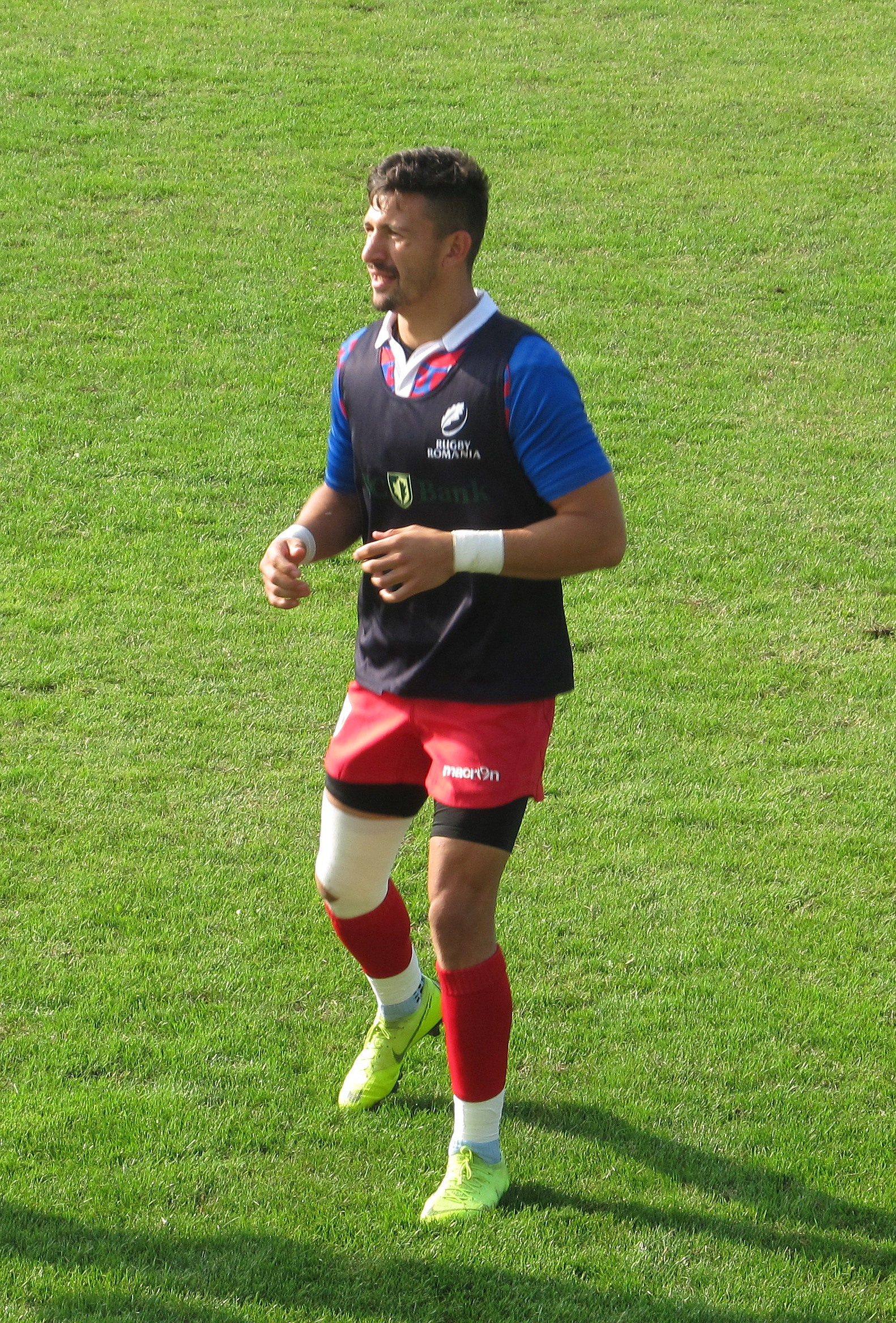
- Daniel Plai training for Steaua during a match half-time in 2019
- Full name: Daniel Plai
- Born: 5 September 1994 (age 32) Gura Humorului, Romania
- Height: 1.77 m (5 ft 9 1/2 in)
- Weight: 76 kg (12 st 0 lb; 168 lb)

Rugby union career
- Position: Scrum-half
- Current team: Steaua
Youth career
- ?–?: Club Sportiv Școlar Gura Humorului
Senior career
Years	Team	Apps	(Points)
?–2018	Politehnica Iași	15	(123)
2018–	Steaua București	0	(0)

Daniel Plai (born 5 September 1994) is a Romanian rugby union football player. He plays as a scrum-half for professional SuperLiga club Steaua București.

== Career ==
Daniel Plai played during his career for Politehnica Iași from where he transferred to Steaua in 2018.
