= CS Politehnica Iași (rugby union) =

Romanian amateur rugby union club

(Romania) Politehnica Iași
- Full name: CS Politehnica Unirea Iași
- Founded: 1952; 74 years ago
- Location: Iași, Romania
- Ground: Stadionul TEPRO (Capacity: 1,000)
- League: Liga Națională de Rugby
- 2017–18: 8th

Politehnica Iași is an amateur rugby union club in Romania, based in the city of Iași which plays in the Liga Națională de Rugby.

== Honours ==
=== Romania ===
- SuperLiga CEC Bank:
  - Third place (1): 2000
- Cupa României:
  - Winners (2): 1979, 2003
- Cupa Moldovei:
  - Winners (1): 1968

== Former squad ==
Politehnica Iași
Pos.	Nat.	Name	Date of birth (age)	Caps	Former club
HK	(Romania)	Tudor Butnariu	12 March 1995 (age 31)		homegrown player
HK	(Romania)	Constantin Niță	31 March 1995 (age 31)		homegrown player
HK	(Moldova)	Igor Orghianu	18 November 1991 (age 34)	15	(Romania) Steaua București
PR	(Romania)	Vasile Bălan	7 February 1992 (age 34)		homegrown player
PR	(Romania)	Ciprian Chiriac	21 March 1993 (age 33)		(Romania) Știința Petroșani
PR	(Romania)	Bogdan Ciubotaru	17 December 1995 (age 30)		homegrown player
PR	(Moldova)	Ruslan Dorogan	4 October 1993 (age 32)	5	(Romania) Dinamo București
PR	(Romania)	Bogdan Sasu	8 May 1990 (age 36)		(Romania) Farul Constanța
LK	(Romania)	Marius Bisoc	20 July 1983 (age 42)		homegrown player
LK	(Romania)	Adrian Călugăreanu	14 August 1988 (age 37)		homegrown player
LK	(Moldova)	Andrei Mahu	3 November 1991 (age 34)	18	(Italy) Zebre
LK	(Romania)	Andrei Toader	17 November 1996 (age 29)		homegrown player
FL	(Romania)	Ștefan Drușcă	6 October 1987 (age 38)		homegrown player
FL	(Romania)	Andrei Fănariu	9 January 1986 (age 40)		homegrown player
FL	(Romania)	Mihai Ilie	4 February 1997 (age 29)		homegrown player
FL	(Romania)	Adrian Rusu	20 December 1995 (age 30)		homegrown player
N8	(Romania)	Constantin Pâslaru	13 May 1985 (age 41)		homegrown player
N8	(Romania)	Cosmin Rațiu	18 July 1979 (age 46)	35	(Romania) CSM Olimpia București
SH	(Romania)	Adrian Rusu	14 November 1995 (age 30)		homegrown player
SH	(Romania)	Alexandru Vaman	14 September 1994 (age 31)		homegrown player
FH	(Romania)	Nicu Ignea	2 November 1988 (age 37)		(Romania) U Cluj-Napoca
FH	(Romania)	Daniel Plai	5 September 1994 (age 31)		homegrown player
CE	(Romania)	Adrian Borș	27 May 1995 (age 31)		homegrown player
CE	(Romania)	Florin Curcan	13 March 1995 (age 31)		(Romania) RC Bârlad
CE	(Romania)	Alexandru Deliu	15 December 1995 (age 30)		homegrown player
CE	(Romania)	Marian Nastasei	20 July 1994 (age 31)		(Romania) Știința Petroșani
CE	(Romania)	Mihai Văcaru	27 September 1987 (age 38)		homegrown player
WG	(Romania)	Răzvan Barbu	6 April 1993 (age 33)		(Romania) Știința Petroșani
WG	(Romania)	Claudiu Mihai	5 March 1995 (age 31)		homegrown player
WG	(Romania)	Florin Neagu	2 November 1994 (age 31)		(Romania) RC Bârlad
FB	(Moldova)	Mihai Golubenco	21 November 1994 (age 31)	16	(Romania) Steaua București
