= Sioeli Lama =

Tongan born Romanian rugby union player

- Born: 12 October 1995 (age 31) Tonga
- Height: 1.75 m (5 ft 9 in)
- Weight: 85 kg (13 st 5 lb; 187 lb)

Rugby union career
- Position: Scrumhalf
Senior career
Years	Team	Apps	(Points)
2015-	CSM București	33	(25)
National sevens team
Years	Team		Comps
2018-	Romania 7`s		3

Sioeli Lama (born 12 October 1995) is a Tongan born Romanian rugby union player who plays as a Scrumhalf for CEC Bank SuperLiga club CSM București.
