= Paul Rusu =

Romania international rugby union player

- Born: Paul Alexandru Rusu; 10 September 1984 (age 42)
- Height: 1.80 m (5 ft 11 in)
- Weight: 105 kg (231 lb)

Rugby union career
- Position: Prop
Senior career
Years	Team	Apps	(Points)
2014–15	București Wolves	1	(0)
- Correct as of 25 October 2015
Provincial / State sides
Years	Team	Apps	(Points)
2012–	Baia Mare	48	(15)
- Correct as of 5 December 2015
International career
Years	Team	Apps	(Points)
2016–	Romania	4	(0)
- Correct as of 28 February 2016

Paul Alexandru Rusu (born 10 September 1984) is a Romanian rugby union player. He plays in the prop position for amateur SuperLiga club Baia Mare and București based European Challenge Cup side the Wolves. He also plays for Romania's national team the Oaks.
