= Josh Peters (rugby union) =

Spain international rugby union player

- Born: Joshua Jason Peters; 12 October 1995 (age 31) Sidcup, England
- Height: 2.04 m (6 ft 8 in)
- Weight: 117 kg (18 st 6 lb)
- School: Oundle School

Rugby union career
- Position: Lock
Youth career
- –2015: Marbella RFC
Senior career
| Years | Team | Apps | (Points) |
| 2015–2018 | Northampton Saints | 0 | (0) |
| 2016–2017 | → Coventry (loan) | 7 | (10) |
| 2017–2018 | → Cambridge (loan) | 13 | (0) |
| 2018–2020 | Blackheath | 20 | (5) |
| 2020–2021 | Stade Dijonnais | | |
| 2021–2022 | Doncaster Knights | | |
| 2022– | Newcastle Falcons | 1 | (5) |
- Correct as of 22 September 2022
International career
| Years | Team | Apps | (Points) |
| 2013 | England U18s | 14 | (0) |
| 2018– | Spain | 10 | (0) |
- Correct as of 22 September 2022

Joshua J. Peters is a Spanish international rugby union player playing for Newcastle Falcons in Premiership Rugby. He has previously played for Coventry and Cambridge and was part of Northampton Saints academy and Blackheath until 2020.

Born in Sidcup Peters moved to Spain aged 2, and began his rugby career in Spain playing for Marbella RFC before returning to the UK to join Oundle School.

Playing for both Spain Under-17s and Under-18s as well as England Under-17s and Under-18s, Peters featured in the Saints Junior Academy before signing a professional contract to become a part of their Senior Academy set-up.

Peters was selected in the England U17s squad for the 2012/13 season and then featured for the England U18s in 2013 making his debut against Scotland.

Peters signed a dual-registers contract with Coventry for the 2016/17 season.

He signed for the Championship side Doncaster Knights from the French Nationale side Stade Dijonnais in July 2021. He then signed for Premiership side Newcastle Falcons prior to the 2022/23 season.

Peters made his Spain debut on 3 March 2018 against Georgia in Tbilisi.
