= Cosmin Rațiu =

Romanian rugby union player

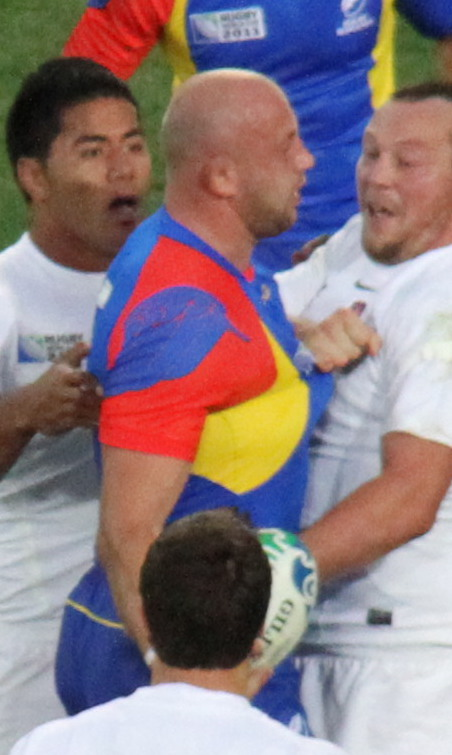
- Rațiu during the 2011 Rugby World Cup
- Born: Cosmin Aurel Rațiu; 18 July 1979 (age 47) Petroșani, Romania
- Height: 6 ft 5.5 in (1.97 m)
- Weight: 260 lb (120 kg; 19 st)

Rugby union career
- Position(s): Flanker, Lock
Senior career
Years	Team	Apps	(Points)
- Știința Petroșani
- CSRTM Callatis Mangalia
- Dinamo București
2006–07	Stade Montois		
2013–14	Dinamo București	3	(0)
2013–14	Farul Constanța	3	(0)
2014–15	CSM București	9	(15)
2015–16	Steaua București		
2016–18	Politehnica Iași	9	(5)
Provincial / State sides
Years	Team	Apps	(Points)
2005–12	București Wolves	24	(10)
- Correct as of 28 March 2020
International career
Years	Team	Apps	(Points)
2003–2011	Romania	34	(10)
Coaching career
- Years: Team
- 2016–18: Politehnica Iași

Cosmin Aurel Rațiu (born 18 July 1979 in Petrosani) is a retired Romanian rugby union player. He also played as a lock or flanker. He is currently a coach.

== Club career ==
He played for CS Dinamo București until moving to Stade Montois in France for the 2006–07 season. He currently plays for Politehnica Iași in the SuperLiga.

== International career ==
He gathered 34 caps for Romania, having made his debut in 2003 against the Czech Republic. He has scored 2 tries, 10 points overall. He played at the 2007 Rugby World Cup and played all four games, three of them as a substitute. He also played at the 2011 Rugby World Cup.
