= Alexandru Țiglă =

Romanian rugby union football player

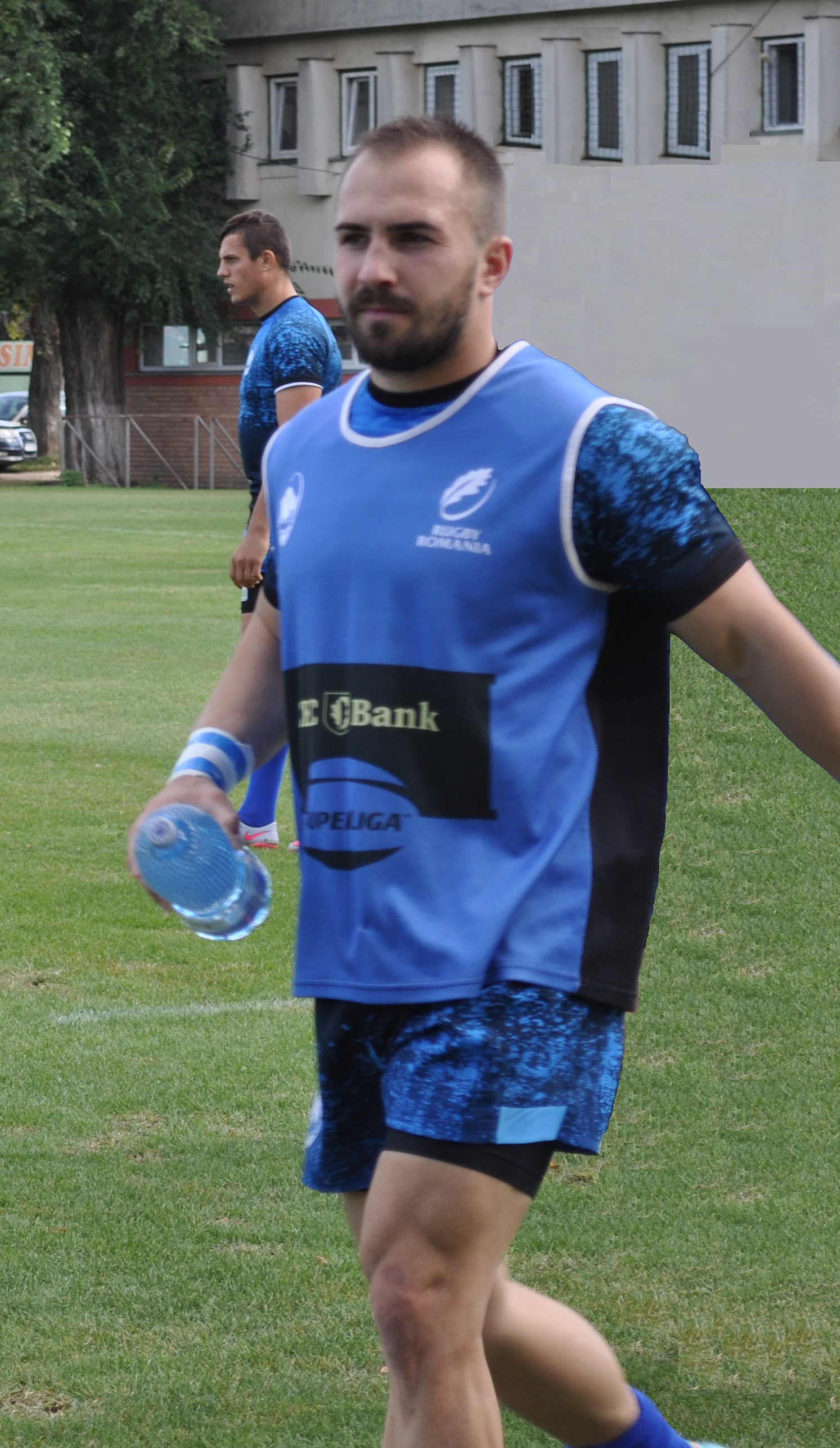
- Alexandru Țiglă training for CSM Baia Mare in 2017
- Full name: Alexandru Țiglă
- Born: 19 February 1993 (age 33) Bârlad, Romania
- Height: 1.75 m (5 ft 9 in)
- Weight: 82 kg (12 st 13 lb; 181 lb)

Rugby union career
- Position: Scrum-half
- Current team: CSM Baia Mare
Youth career
- Clubul Sportiv Școlar Bârlad
Amateur team(s)
Years	Team	Apps	(Points)
- RC Bârlad
Senior career
Years	Team	Apps	(Points)
2015–16	CSM București	2	(10)
2016–Present	CSM Baia Mare	23	(54)
- Correct as of 4 March 2020
International career
Years	Team	Apps	(Points)
2016–Present	Romania	4	(0)
- Correct as of 4 March 2020
National sevens team
Years	Team		Comps
2014–Present	Romania		7

Alexandru Țiglă (born 19 February 1993) is a Romanian rugby union football player. He plays as a scrum-half for professional SuperLiga club CSM Baia Mare.

== Club career ==
Țiglă started playing rugby at the age of 14 under the guidance of Ciprian Popa from Clubul Sportiv Școlar Bârlad. Soon after he moved to the local amateur club RC Bârlad. After some good performances he moved to Bucharest and joined the ranks of CSM București, this time making his debut in the Romanian SuperLiga. After just one season with the Tigers he was signed by CSM Baia Mare in mid July 2016.

== International career ==
He also plays for Romania's national team, the Oaks, making his international debut at the autumn tests of 2016 in a match against the Los Teros. He is also a proficient rugby union sevens player.
