= Alexandru Alexe =

Romanian rugby union player

- Full name: Alexandru Alexe
- Born: 26 August 1997 (age 29)
- Height: 1.80 m (5 ft 11 in)
- Weight: 95 kg (14 st 13 lb; 209 lb)

Rugby union career
- Position: Flanker
- Current team: CSM Baia Mare
Senior career
Years	Team	Apps	(Points)
2018–present	CSM Baia Mare	23	(40)
- Correct as of 19 January 2021
International career
Years	Team	Apps	(Points)
2021–present	Romania	1	(0)
- Correct as of 7 November 2021

Alexandru Alexe (born 27 August 1997) is a Romanian rugby union player. He plays as a Flanker for Romanian SuperLiga club CSM Baia Mare.

== Club career ==
Alexandru Alexe started playing for CSM Baia Mare in 2018, at the age of 21, where from there, has improved continuously as a player to a point where he is now a regular starter for his club.

== International career ==
Alexe was selected for Romania's national team, the Oaks being called up by Andy Robinson to play against Belgium in February 2021, but he did not make his debut on that occasion.

Alexe made his international debut during the 3rd week of 2021 Autumn Nations Series in a test match against Los Teros on 7 November 2021.
