= Bogdan Doroftei =

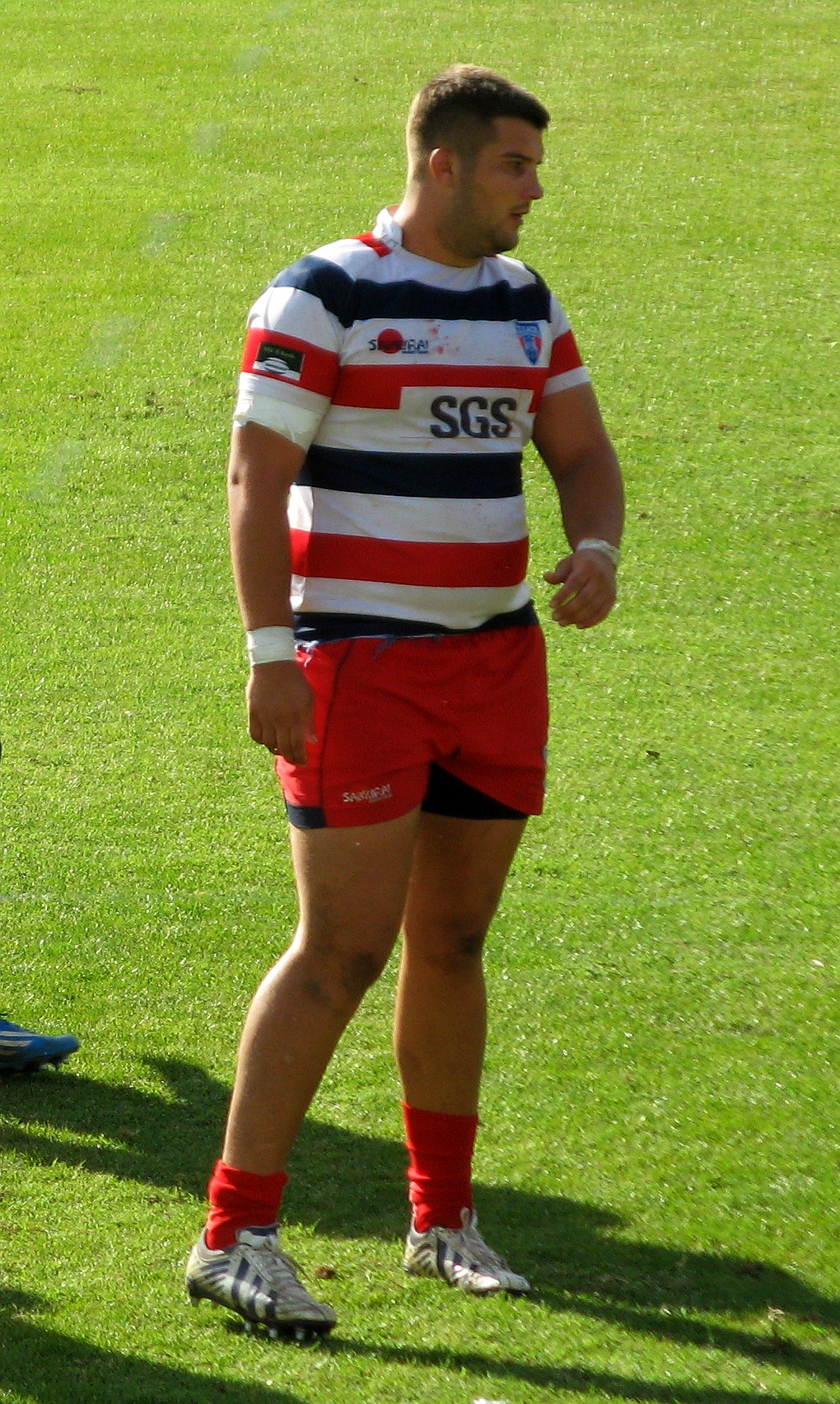
- Bogdan Doroftei playing for Steaua in 2017
- Full name: Bogdan-Andrei Doroftei
- Born: 13 November 1995 (age 31) Bârlad, Romania
- Height: 1.99 m (6 ft 6 1/2 in)
- Weight: 107 kg (16 st 12 lb; 236 lb)

Rugby union career
- Position: Lock
- Current team: Steaua
Senior career
| Years | Team | Apps | (Points) |
| ?–2015 | CSS Bârlad | | |
| 2015– | Steaua București | 13 | (5) |
- Correct as of 23 September 2017

Bogdan-Andrei Doroftei (born 13 November 1995) is a Romanian rugby union football player. He plays as a lock for professional SuperLiga club Steaua București.

== Career ==
Before playing for Steaua, Bogdan Doroftei played for CSS Bârlad.
