= Florian Roșu =

Romanian rugby union player

- Full name: Florian Ghiorghiță Roșu
- Born: 20 April 1993 (age 33)
- Height: 1.93 m (6 ft 4 in)
- Weight: 106 kg (16 st 10 lb; 234 lb)

Rugby union career
- Position(s): Lock; Flanker
- Current team: Știința Baia Mare
Senior career
Years	Team	Apps	(Points)
2012–13	Știința Baia Mare	1	(0)
2013–15	Dinamo București	9	(5)
2015–Present	Știința Baia Mare	36	(20)
- Correct as of 2 July 2021
International career
Years	Team	Apps	(Points)
2021–Present	Romania	0	(0)
- Correct as of 2 July 2021

Florian Roșu (born 20 April 1993) is a Romanian rugby union player. He plays as a Lock or as a flanker for Romanian SuperLiga club Știința Baia Mare.

== Club career ==
Florian Roșu started playing for SuperLiga in 2012, at the age of 19 but moved to Dinamo București after one seasons in Baia Mare where he would rejoin his first professional club two years later in 2015. However, upon a few seasons, Roșu became a non-negotiable starter for Baia Mare and at times, the captain of the side.

== International career ==
Roșu was selected for the Oaks for their Summer Tests in 2021, making his international debut on the 2nd of July in a test match against Los Pumas.
