= Kamil Sobota =

Romania international rugby union player

- Full name: Kamil Mihail Sobota
- Born: 31 March 1992 (age 34) Cluj-Napoca, Romania
- Height: 1.92 m (6 ft 3 1/2 in)
- Weight: 110 kg (17 st 5 lb; 240 lb)

Rugby union career
- Position: Lock
Youth career
- Universitatea Cluj
- Dinamo București
Senior career
Years	Team	Apps	(Points)
2010–13	Dinamo București	2	(0)
2013–14	Universitatea Cluj	8	(0)
2014–19	CSM București	44	(20)
2019–20	Tomitanii Constanța	4	(10)
2020–22	Steaua București	0	(0)
2023–	Dinamo București	0	(0)
- Correct as of 29 February 2020
International career
Years	Team	Apps	(Points)
2020-	Romania	9	(5)
- Correct as of 20 May 2023

Kamil Mihail Sobota (born 31 March 1992) is a Romanian rugby union football player. He plays as a number 8 for professional Liga Națională de Rugby club Dinamo București.

== Club career ==
Kamil Sobota started playing rugby in his hometown of Cluj-Napoca at Universitatea but finished his junior years in Bucharest at Dinamo. His first professional club was Dinamo, joining the senior squad after ending his junior years. For a brief period of time he returned to Universitatea Cluj, moving after one season once again in Bucharest, this time joining CSM. After 4 seasons with CSM București he transferred to Tomitanii Constanța in 2019 following the dissolution of his former club.

== International career ==
Sobota is also selected for Romania's national team, the Oaks, making his international debut during the Week 2 of 2020 Rugby Europe Championship in a test match against the Os Lobos. Sobota scored its first try for Romania on 11 November 2022, in a home test match against Chile, on the Arcul de Triumf National Stadium.
