= Paul Popoaia =

Romania international rugby union player

- Full name: Paul Popoaia
- Born: 29 May 2000 (age 26) Pașcani, Romania
- Height: 1.78 m (5 ft 10 in)
- Weight: 80 kg (12 st 8 lb; 180 lb)

Rugby union career
- Position(s): Wing, full-back
- Current team: CSM Baia Mare
Youth career
- Clubul Sportiv Școlar 2 Centrul
- Național de Excelență (CSȘ 2 CNE) Baia Mare
Senior career
Years	Team	Apps	(Points)
2019–Present	CSM Baia Mare	5	(10)
- Correct as of 14 January 2019
International career
Years	Team	Apps	(Points)
- Romania U-20
- Romania 7's
2021–Present	Romania	3	(0)
- Correct as of 13 March 2021

Paul Popoaia (born 29 May 2000) is a Romanian rugby union player. He plays as a wing or full-back for professional Liga Națională de Rugby club CSM Baia Mare.

== Club career ==
Paul started playing rugby at the age of 12, evolving between 2012 and 2014 under the guidance of Ioan Hău. Between 2014 and 2019 he was part of the Clubului Sportiv Școlar 2 Baia Mare squad. With the CSS2 Baia Mare team led by coaches Răzvan Popovici and Mircea Taloș, he won the national championship title in rugby (Under 16). With the U-17 team he won the national championship titles both in Rugby 7s and Rugby 10s . His last national title in rugby union was won with the U-19 team, and also a national vice-title with the U-17 team.

At the end of both 2018 and 2019 competitional years, Paul was voted the best junior player in the country.

In August 2019 he started his professional journey joining SuperLiga side, CSM Baia Mare.

== International career ==
Internationally, Paul Popoaia succeeded in 2018 to be present at the European Championship in Poland with the U-18 national team of Romania, the same year being present at the European Rugby Championship 7s hosted by Lithuania. With the U-20 national team he was present both at the World Championship hosted by the capital of Romania and at the European Championship U-20 held in Portugal.

=== Senior debut in Rugby Europe Championship ===
Popoaia is also selected for Romania's national team, the Oaks, making his international debut during Round 2 of 2021 Rugby Europe Championship in a test match against the Os Lobos.
