= Damian Strătilă =

Romania international rugby union player

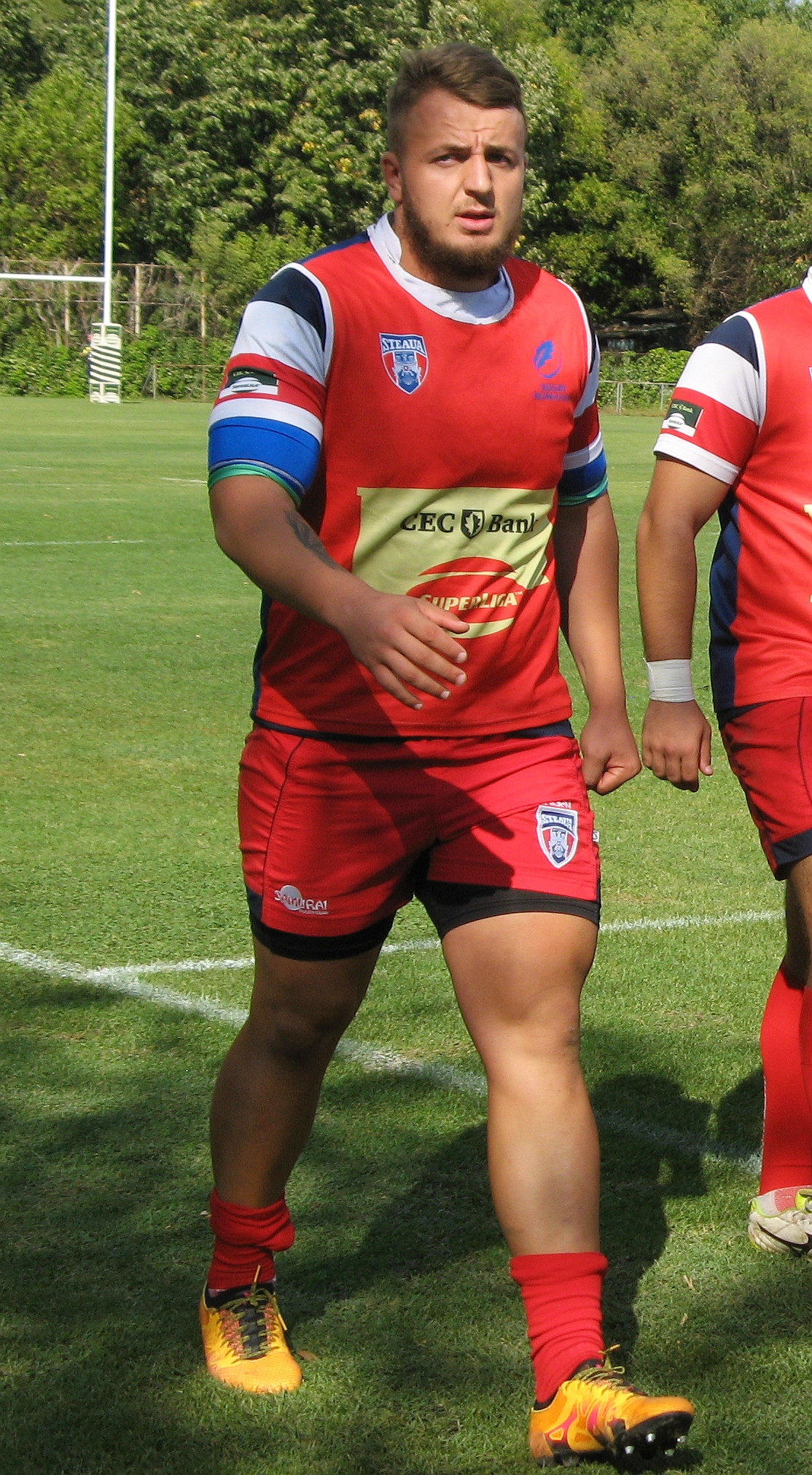
- Damian Strătilă training with Steaua in 2017
- Full name: Damian-Cristian Strătilă
- Born: 28 July 1996 (age 30) Constanța, Romania
- Height: 1.89 m (6 ft 2 1/2 in)
- Weight: 114 kg (17 st 13 lb; 251 lb)
- Notable relative: Sabin Strătilă (brother)

Rugby union career
- Position: Flanker
- Current team: CSA Steaua București
Senior career
Years	Team	Apps	(Points)
2016–19	Steaua București	33	(45)
2019–Present	Timișoara Saracens	7	(0)
- Correct as of 27 March 2019
International career
Years	Team	Apps	(Points)
2021–Present	Romania	1	(0)
- Correct as of 7 November 2021

Damian-Cristian Strătilă (born 28 July 1996) is a Romanian rugby union football player. He plays as a flanker for professional SuperLiga club Timișoara Saracens.

== Personal life ==
Damian-Cristian is the younger brother of former Steaua teammate Sabin Strătilă.

== International career ==
Strătilă is also selected for Romania's national team, the Oaks, making his international debut during the 3rd week of 2021 Autumn Nations Series in a test match against Los Teros on 7 November 2021.
