= Eugen Apjok =

Romania international rugby union player

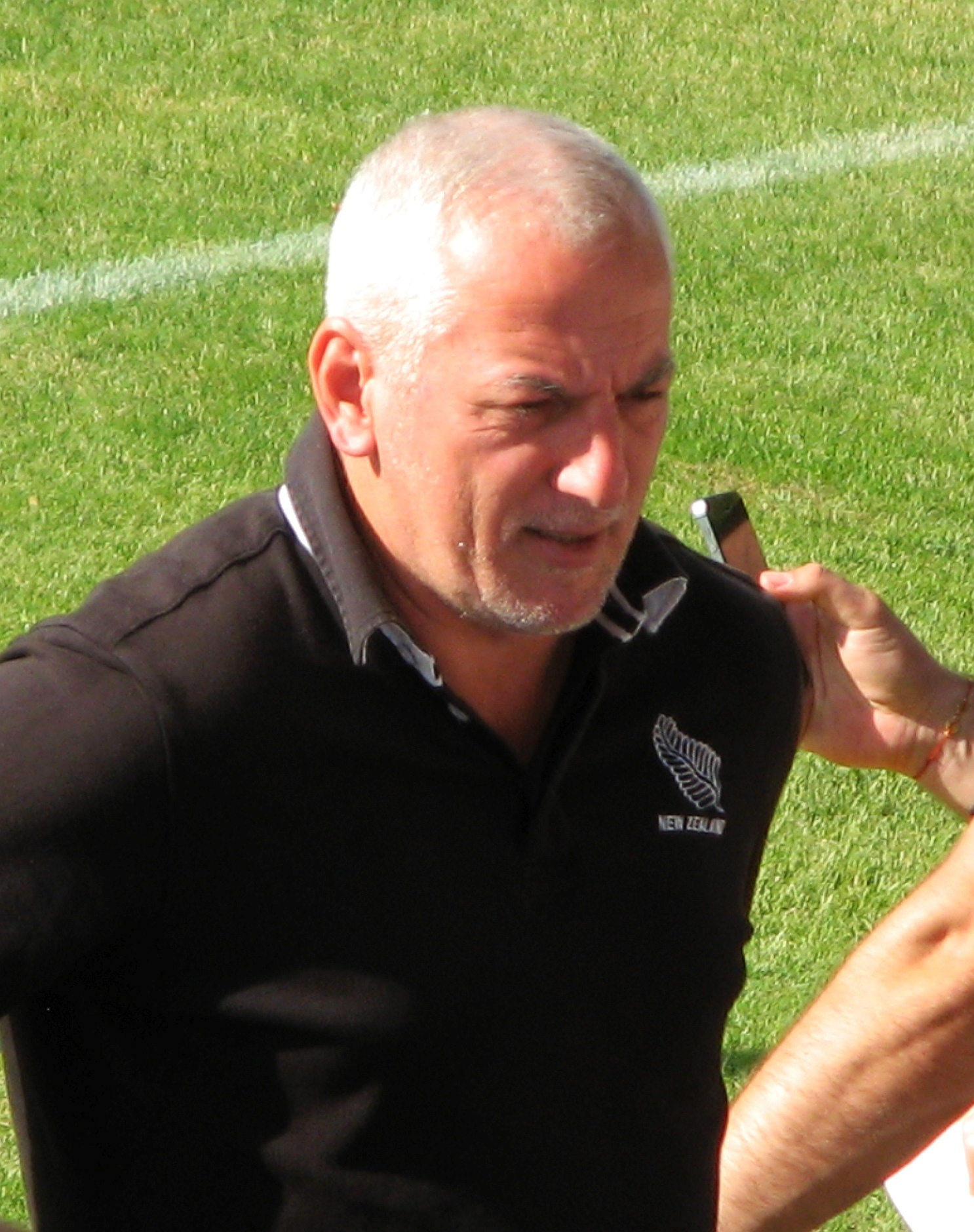
- Eugen Apjok attending a SuperLiga match between Steaua and CSM Baia Mare in 2017
- Born: Eugen Apjok; 15 April 1972 (age 54) Baia Mare, Romania
- Occupation: Head Coach

Rugby union career
- Position: Fly-half
- Current team: Baia Mare
International career
Years	Team	Apps	(Points)
1996–2001	Romania	3	(17)

Eugen Apjok (born 15 April 1972) is a former Romanian rugby union player and a current coach who is the manager of Baia Mare. He played as a fly-half. In 2016 he was voted the best rugby head coach in Romania. In December 2022 he was appointed manager of the Romania national rugby union team, in preparation for the 2023 Rugby World Cup.

== Club career ==
He mostly played for Baia Mare, from the early nineties.

== International career ==
Apjok gathered 3 caps for Romania, from his debut in 1996 to his last game in 2001. He scored 1 try and 6 conversions during his international career, 17 points on aggregate. He was a member as an assistant coach of his national side for the 8th Rugby World Cup in 2015.
