= CSM Știința Baia Mare =

Romanian rugby union club

Știința Baia Mare
- Full name: Club Sportiv Municipal Știința Baia Mare
- Nickname(s): Zimbrii (The Bisons); Băimărenii (The People of Baia Mare)
- Founded: 1977; 49 years ago
- Location: Baia Mare, Romania
- Ground: Arena Zimbrilor (Capacity: 2,300)
- President: Călin Matei
- Coach: Eugen Apjok
- Captain: Nicolaas Immelman
- League: Liga de Rugby Kaufland
- 2026: 4th

CSM Știința Baia Mare, commonly referred to as Știința Baia Mare (Romanian pronunciation: [ʃtiintsa baia mare]), is a Romanian professional rugby union club based in Baia Mare that competes in the Liga de Rugby Kaufland, Romania's top division of rugby.

== History ==
Originally founded in 1977 as Racemin Baia Mare, Știința Baia Mare quickly rose to prominence in the Romanian rugby scene. Despite encountering formidable competition from clubs such as Steaua București and Dinamo București, Baia Mare solidified its position as a dominant force in the Romanian rugby championship.

The pinnacle of their early success came in the 1980–81 season when they clinched their first tournament victory, the Romanian Cup, in a thrilling match against Dinamo București, which left the local fans in Baia Mare ecstatic. Building on this momentum, Baia Mare secured their inaugural Romanian championship in the 1989–90 season, during what is often regarded as the golden era of Romanian rugby throughout the 1980s.

However, sustaining their initial success proved challenging, and Baia Mare experienced a period of fluctuating fortunes. They managed to add two more Romanian Cup trophies to their cabinet in 1990 and 1999, respectively, but significant championship titles eluded them until 2009 when they clinched their second championship title, two decades after their first.

In the subsequent years, Știința Baia Mare regained their dominance in Romanian rugby, winning the championship four times within the last decade. However, unlike in previous years, they faced stiff competition from USV Timișoara during their championship campaigns.

== Honours ==
=== Domestic ===
==== Leagues ====
- Liga de Rugby Kaufland
  - Winners (10): 1989–90, 2008–09, 2010, 2011, 2014, 2018–19, 2019–20, 2021, 2022, 2025
  - Runners-up (8): 1987–88, 1990–91, 2012, 2013, 2015, 2016–17, 2017–18, 2023

==== Cups ====
- Cupa României
  - Winners (6): 1980–81, 1989–90, 1998–99, 2010, 2012, 2020
  - Runners-up (13): 1981–82, 1985–86, 1987–88, 1988–89, 1999–2000, 2005–06, 2006–07, 2011, 2013, 2014, 2016, 2017–18, 2021
- Cupa Regelui
  - Winners (2) – Record: 2016, 2017
  - Runners-up (1): 2015

=== Continental ===
- Central and Eastern European Rugby Union Cup
  - Winners (2) – Record: 2009–10, 2010–11

== Current squad ==
Știința Baia Mare Liga de Rugby Kaufland squad
**Props**: (Romania) **Mihai Dico**; (Georgia (country)) Revazi Dugladze; (Romania) Costel Grămadă; (Romania) Robert Hîncu; (Romania) Ciprian Sălceanu; (South Africa) James Scott; (Georgia (country)) Sandro Zubashvili; **Hookers**: (Romania) **Robert Irimescu**; (Georgia (country)) Levan Papidze; (South Africa) Tristan Trollip; **Locks**: (Georgia (country)) Mate Dardzulidze; (Georgia (country)) Nugzar Gelashvili; (Romania) Silviu Grădinaru; (Romania) **Ștefan Iancu**	**Back row**: (Romania) **Alexandru Alexe**; (Georgia (country)) **Beka Bitsadze**; (Romania) **Nicolaas Immelman** (c); (Romania) **Florian Roșu**; (Romania) Andrei Schutz; **Scrum-halves**: (Romania) **Vlăduț Bocăneț**; (Georgia (country)) Luka Dvalishvili; (Romania) **Alexandru Țiglă**; **Fly-halves**: (Romania) Andrei Bucșa; (Romania) Alexandru Harasim; (Romania) **Mihai Mureșan**; (Romania) Luca Nichitean; (New Zealand) Nikau McGregor; (New Zealand) Miles Grant	**Centres**: (South Africa) Anelka Barends; (Romania) **Sione Fakaʻosilea**; (Romania) **Jason Tomane**; **Wings**: (Romania) **Mihai Lămboiu**; (Romania) Darin Onț; (Romania) **Taliaʻuli Sikuea**; **Fullbacks**: (South Africa) Kefentse Mahlo; (Romania) **Paul Popoaia**
(c) denotes the team captain, **Bold** denotes internationally capped players.^{*} denotes players qualified to play for Romania on residency or dual nationality.

== Coaching staff ==
Name	Nationality	Role
Silviu Duma	ROU	Manager
Eugen Apjok	ROU	Head coach
Paul Rusu	ROU	Assistant coach
Ionuț Pop	ROU	Strength and conditioning coach
Marius Peride	ROU	Team doctor
Codrin Despea	ROU	Masseur

== See also ==
- Rugby union in Romania
