= Iñaki Laskurain =

Spanish rugby union player (1968-)

- Born: Iñaki Laskurain González; 5 August 1968 (age 58) Eibar, Basque Country, Spain
- Height: 6 ft 3 in (191 cm)
- Weight: 198 lb (90 kg)
- Occupation: President of the Basque Rugby Federation

Rugby union career
- Position: Flanker
Senior career
Years	Team	Apps	(Points)
1984-198?	Eibar RT		
1986-1989	Atlético San Sebastián		
1989-1997	Getxo Artea RT		
1997-199?	Aviron Bayonnais		
International career
Years	Team	Apps	(Points)
1991-1995	Spain	15	(0)
Coaching career
- Years: Team
- 2005-2007: Durango RT
- 2007-2009: Bera Bera RT

Iñaki Laskurain González (born in Eibar, on 5 August 1968) is a Spanish former rugby player and coach, who played as flanker. He was the President of the Basque Rugby Federation between 2013 and 2020.

== Career ==
He mostly played for Getxo Artea RT, with which he played 9 seasons and won 4 Copa del Rey de Rugby titles, 1 División de Honor title. Laskurain also played for Eibar RT, Aviron Bayonnais and Atlético San Sebastián. He was also an international for Spain, with his first senior cap being against France at Estadio Nacional Complutense, Madrid, on 28 April 1991 and his last international cap was during the test match against Scotland in Madrid, on 6 May 1995. He also played for Spain U23 and Spain sevens, disputing the 1993 Rugby World Cup Sevens for the latter. He also played Basque Country national team at the San Mamés stadium in 1989. Outside the fields, he worked as an insurance broker.

== Coaching career ==
Laskurain first coached Durango RT between 2005 and 2007. Later, he coached Bera Bera RT between 2007 and 2009 until being sacked. He also coached the Basque Country national team.
