= 2025–26 División de Honor de Rugby =

Spanish rugby union competition

2025–26 División de Honor
- Countries: Spain
- Date: 27 September 2025

The 2025–26 División de Honor is the 59th season of the División de Honor, the top flight of Spanish domestic rugby union.

== Competition format ==
The season takes place between October and May.

Points are awarded as follows:

- 4 points for a win
- 2 points for a draw
- 1 bonus point for a team scoring 4 tries or more in a match
- 1 bonus point for a team that loses a match by 7 points or fewer

Each team plays ten games, one game against each opponent. Then the league divides into two groups: the top six teams progress to Group A and the remaining five teams progress to Group B. The teams face the other members of their groups once more, meaning Group A teams play a total of 15 games while Group B play 14.

Eight teams progress through to the playoffs: the top two teams from Group B qualify along with the six teams from Group A.

=== Promotion and relegation ===
The second-tier División de Honor B de Rugby is made up of three regional groups. The top eight teams across the three groups play off; the champion is promoted to División de Honor.

Like the 2024/25 season, two teams would be relegated, reducing the league to 10 teams.

== Teams ==
Pozuelo and Les Abelles were relegated while Liceo Francés were promoted.

Team	Stadium	Capacity	Location	
Alcobendas	Las Terrazas	2,000	Alcobendas, Madrid	Current División de Honor teams
Aparejadores	San Amaro	1,000	Burgos, Castile and León	Current División de Honor teams
Ciencias	Instalaciones Deportivas La Cartuja	3,000	Seville, Andalusia	Current División de Honor teams
Complutense Cisneros	Estadio Complutense	12,400	Moncloa-Aravaca, Madrid	Current División de Honor teams
El Salvador	Pepe Rojo	5,000	Valladolid, Castile and León	Current División de Honor teams
FC Barcelona	La Teixonera	500	Barcelona, Catalonia	Current División de Honor teams
La Vila	Campo de Rugby "El Pantano"	1,550	La Vila Joiosa, Valencia	Current División de Honor teams
Liceo Francés	Estadio Ramon Urtubi	500	Hortaleza, Madrid	Current División de Honor teams
Ordizia	Altamira	2,000	Ordizia, Basque Country	Current División de Honor teams
Santboiana	Baldiri Aleu	3,500	Sant Boi de Llobregat, Catalonia	Current División de Honor teams
Valladolid	Pepe Rojo	5,000	Valladolid, Castile and León	Current División de Honor teams

== Results and standings ==
	ALC	APA	CIE	CIS	ELS	FCB	LAV	LF	ORD	SAN	VAL
Alcobendas	—		51 - 27		29 - 21		46 - 19		48 - 16		13 - 35
Aparejadores	23 - 18	—		40 - 40		56 - 8		45 - 0		23 - 20	
Ciencias		15 - 53	—	22 - 15		29 - 24		39 - 49		33 - 13	
Complutense Cisneros	27 - 28			—	33 - 40		45 - 14		29 - 23	20 - 12	
El Salvador		7 - 34	19 - 28		—		26 - 38		29 - 23		21 - 32
FC Barcelona	14 - 18			19 - 37	20 - 10	—		13 - 41		18 - 22	
La Vila		32 - 25	40 - 21			43 - 7	—	44 - 27			29 - 35
Liceo Francés	20 - 32			47 - 30	28 - 32			—	32 - 19	20 - 15	
Ordizia		20 - 36	40 - 21			17 - 20	27 - 16		—		26 - 19
Santboiana	37 - 19				13 - 20		38 - 12		31 - 33	—	15 - 34
Valladolid		23 - 26	48 - 15	37 - 12		31 - 12		24 - 10			—

Sources: FE Rugby First Phase

=== First phase ===
	Team	P	W	D	L	F	A	+/-	TF	TA	+/-	BP	Los	Pts
1	Aparejadores	10	8	1	1	361	183	178	46	20	26	5	1	40
2	Valladolid	10	8	0	2	318	179	139	42	18	24	5	2	39
3	Alcobendas	10	7	0	3	302	239	63	37	32	5	2	1	31
4	La Vila	10	5	0	5	287	297	-10	37	41	-4	2	1	23
5	Liceo Francés	10	5	0	5	274	293	-19	33	39	-6	1	1	22
6	Complutense Cisneros	10	4	1	5	288	282	6	35	35	0	1	3	22
7	Ordizia	10	4	0	6	244	281	-37	25	36	-11	0	3	19
8	Ciencias	10	4	0	6	250	352	-102	33	43	-10	2	0	18
9	Santboiana	10	3	0	7	216	232	-16	29	30	-1	2	4	18
10	El Salvador	10	4	0	6	225	278	-53	28	29	-1	0	0	16
11	FC Barcelona	10	2	0	8	155	304	-149	18	40	-22	0	3	11

Source: FE Rugby

Qualified for Group A
Qualified for Group B

=== Second phase ===
Group A

	Team	P	W	D	L	F	A	+/-	TF	TA	+/-	Bon	Los	Pts
1	Valladolid	13	11	0	2	445	237	208	59	25	34	6	2	52
2	Aparejadores	13	8	2	3	435	281	154	54	31	23	5	1	42
3	Alcobendas	13	9	1	3	390	314	76	47	41	6	2	1	41
4	Complutense Cisneros	13	6	1	6	379	347	32	48	43	5	2	4	32
5	Liceo Francés	13	6	0	7	345	368	-23	40	48	-8	1	1	26
6	La Vila	13	5	0	8	341	431	-90	45	60	-15	2	2	24

Source: FE Rugby

Group B

	Team	P	W	D	L	F	A	+/-	TF	TA	+/-	Bon	Los	Pts
1	Ordizia	13	5	1	7	321	346	-25	35	42	-7	1	4	27
2	El Salvador	12	6	0	6	280	307	-27	34	32	2	1	0	25
3	Ciencias	12	5	1	6	297	398	-101	37	50	-13	2	0	24
4	Santboiana	12	3	0	9	253	289	-36	33	37	-4	2	5	19
5	FC Barcelona	13	3	0	10	214	382	-168	26	49	-23	0	4	16

Source: FE Rugby

Qualified for playoff quarterfinals
Relegation to División de Honor B

== Copa del Rey ==
The Copa del Rey changed format, expanding to 20 teams (the 11 teams from División de Honor plus 9 from the newly established second-tier División de Honor Élite).The group phase, consisting of four groups of five, runs from 20 November to 21 December 2025, followed by single-leg semifinals in February and a final in May.

=== Group A ===
	Team	P	W	D	L	F	A	+/-	TF	TA	+/-	BP	Los	Pts
1	Valladolid	4	4	0	0	172	22	150	27	3	24	4	0	20
2	FC Barcelona	4	2	0	2	107	98	9	17	12	5	2	1	11
3	Ordizia	4	2	0	2	149	75	74	20	10	10	2	0	10
4	Ingenieros Industriales Las Rozas	4	2	0	2	75	176	-101	10	26	-16	0	0	8
5	Belenos RC	4	0	0	4	63	195	-132	8	31	-23	0	1	1

Source: FE Rugby

=== Group B ===
	Team	P	W	D	L	F	A	+/-	TF	TA	+/-	BP	Los	Pts
1	La Vila	4	4	0	0	126	88	38	18	14	4	0	0	16
2	El Salvador	4	3	0	1	139	59	80	20	9	11	1	1	14
3	Ciencias	4	2	0	2	89	91	-2	15	13	2	1	0	9
4	Hernani	4	1	0	3	94	123	-29	14	17	-3	0	0	4
5	Sant Cugat	4	0	0	4	50	137	-87	7	21	-14	0	1	1

Source: FE Rugby

=== Group C ===
	Team	P	W	D	L	F	A	+/-	TF	TA	+/-	BP	Los	Pts
1	Complutense Cisneros	4	3	0	1	191	87	104	30	10	20	3	0	15
2	Santboiana	4	3	0	1	158	77	81	23	10	13	2	1	15
3	Gernika	4	2	0	2	70	109	-39	8	16	-8	0	1	9
4	Pozuelo	4	1	0	3	98	158	-60	10	22	-12	0	0	4
5	Valencia	4	1	0	3	84	170	-86	11	24	-13	0	0	4

Source: FE Rugby

=== Group D ===
	Team	P	W	D	L	F	A	+/-	TF	TA	+/-	BP	Los	Pts
1	Alcobendas	4	4	0	0	153	45	108	23	6	17	2	0	18
2	Aparejadores	4	3	0	1	175	58	117	26	6	20	3	0	15
3	Liceo Francés	4	2	0	2	93	111	-18	13	16	-3	2	0	10
4	Fénix CR Zaragoza	4	1	0	3	64	126	-62	6	19	-13	0	0	4
5	Les Abelles	4	0	0	4	37	182	-145	5	26	-21	0	0	0

Source: FE Rugby

Qualified for Semifinals
Eliminated

=== Semifinals ===
8 February 2026

(Castile and León) Valladolid	18-22	(Community of Madrid) Alcobendas

8 February 2026

(Community of Madrid) Complutense Cisneros	39-21	(Valencian Community) La Vila

=== Final ===
2/3 May

(Community of Madrid) Alcobendas	v	(Community of Madrid) Complutense Cisneros

FE Rugby
