= List of football stadiums in Spain =

This is a list of football stadiums in Spain, ranked in order of capacity, with the minimum capacity being 5,000. Stadiums in bold are part of the 2026–27 La Liga.

== Current stadiums ==
No.	Image	Stadium	Capacity	City	County	Home team	Opened	UEFA rank
1		**Camp Nou** (Note: Under construction)	62,652 (105,000 expected)	Barcelona	Catalonia	FC Barcelona	1957	4/4 stars
2		**Santiago Bernabéu**	83,186	Madrid	Madrid	Real Madrid CF	1947	4/4 stars
3		**La Cartuja**	71,374	Seville	Andalusia	Spain national football team Real Betis	1999	4/4 stars
4		**Metropolitano**	70,813	Madrid	Madrid	Atlético Madrid	1994	4/4 stars
5		Nou Mestalla	70,044	Valencia	Valencia	Valencia CF	2027 (scheduled)	4/4 stars
6		Benito Villamarín	60,270	Seville	Andalusia	Real Betis	1929	4/4 stars
7		Lluís Companys	55,926	Barcelona	Catalonia	No tenant	1927	3/4 stars
8		**San Mamés**	53,331	Bilbao	Basque Country	Athletic Bilbao	2013	4/4 stars
9		**Mestalla**	49,430	Valencia (València)	Valencia	Valencia CF	1923	4/4 stars
10		**Ramón Sánchez Pizjuán**	43,864	Seville	Andalusia	Sevilla FC	1957	4/4 stars
11		**Anoeta**	40,000	Donostia-San Sebastián	Basque Country	Real Sociedad	1993	4/4 stars
12		**RCDE Stadium**	38,529	Cornellà de Llobregat	Catalonia	RCD Espanyol	2009	4/4 stars
13		La Romareda	33,608	Zaragoza	Aragon	Real Zaragoza	1957	4/4 stars
14		**Riazor**	32,490	A Coruña	Galicia	Deportivo de A Coruña	1944	4/4 stars
15		Gran Canaria	32,400	Las Palmas	Canary Islands	UD Las Palmas	2003	4/4 stars
16		**Martínez Valero**	31,388	Elche / Elx	Valencia	Elche CF	1976	4/4 stars
17		Nueva Condomina	31,179	Murcia	Murcia	Real Murcia	2006	4/4 stars
18		Carlos Tartiere	30,500	Oviedo / Uviéu	Asturias	Real Oviedo	2000	4/4 stars
19		La Rosaleda	30,044	Málaga	Andalusia	Málaga CF	1941	4/4 stars
20		El Molinón	29,371	Gijón / Xixón	Asturias	Real Sporting Gijón	1908	4/4 stars
21		José Zorrilla	27,618	Valladolid	Castile and León	Real Valladolid	1982	3/4 stars
22		Ciutat de València	26,354	Valencia	Valencia	Levante UD	1969	4/4 stars
23		Son Moix	25,736	**Palma**	Balearic Islands	RCD Mallorca	1999	4/4 stars
24		Nuevo Mirandilla	25,033	Cádiz	Andalusia	Cádiz C.F.	1955	3/4 stars
25		**Balaídos**	24,870	Vigo	Galicia	RC Celta de Vigo	1928	4/4 stars
26		José Rico Pérez	27,618	Alicante	Valencia	Hércules de Alicante C.F.	1974	3/4 stars
27		**El Sadar**	23,576	Pamplona	Navarre	CA Osasuna	1967	3/4 stars
28		**La Cerámica**	23,500	Villarreal	Valencia	Villarreal CF	1923	3/4 stars
29		Heliodoro Rodríguez López	22,824	Santa Cruz de Tenerife	Canary Islands	CD Tenerife	1925	
30		**El Sardinero**	22,514	Santander	Cantabria	Real Racing Club de Santander	1988	
31		Nuevo Colombino	21,670	Huelva	Andalusia	RC Recreativo de Huelva	2001	
32		Los Cármenes	21,600	Granada	Andalusia	Granada CF	1995	
33		UD Almería Stadium	21,350	Almería	Andalusia	Almería	2004	
34		Nuevo Arcángel	20,989	Córdoba	Andalusia	Córdoba CF	1994	
35		Chapín	20,523	Jerez de la Frontera	Andalusia	Xerez C.D. Xerez Deportivo FC	1988	
36		**Mendizorrotza**	19,840	Vitoria-Gasteiz	Basque Country	Deportivo Alavés	1924	
37		Carlos Belmonte	17,524	Albacete	Castile-La Mancha	Albacete BP	1960	
38		**Coliseum**	17,393	Getafe	Madrid	Getafe	1998	
39		El Helmántico	17,341	Salamanca	Castile and León	Salamanca CF UDS	1970	
40		Estadio Municipal de La Línea de la Concepción	16,120	La Línea de la Concepción	Andalusia	Linense	1969	
41		Las Gaunas	15,902	Logroño	La Rioja (Spain)	UD Logroñés SD Logroñés; Logroño	2002	
42		Nuevo Vivero	15,198	Badajoz	Extremadura	Badajoz	1998	
43		Cartagonova	15,105	Cartagena	Murcia	Cartagena	1987	
44		Romano	14,600	Mérida	Extremadura	Mérida	1954	
45		Nou Estadi	14,591	Tarragona	Catalonia	Gimnàstic	1972	
46		**Vallecas**	14,505	Madrid	Madrid	Rayo Vallecano	1976	
47		Castàlia	14,485	Castellón de la Plana	Valencia	Castellón	1987	
48		El Soto	14,000	Móstoles	Madrid	Móstoles	1981	
49		Camp d'Esports	13,500	Lleida	Catalonia	Lleida Esportiu	1918	
50		Juan Rojas	13,468	Almería	Andalusia	Almería (rugby)	1976	
51		Montilivi	13,450	Girona	Catalonia	Girona	1970	
52		Reino de León	13,346	León	Castile and León	Cultural Leonesa	2001	
53		El Plantío	12,642	Burgos	Castile and León	Burgos	1964	
54		La Victoria	12,569	Jaén	Andalusia	Jaén	2001	
55		Butarque	12,450	Leganés	Madrid	Leganés	1998	
56		Nacional Complutense	12,400	Madrid	Madrid	Cisneros (rugby)	1943	
57		A Malata	12,042	Ferrol	Galicia	Racing Ferrol	1993	
58		Verónica Boquete de San Lázaro	12,000	Santiago de Compostela	Galicia	Compostela	1993	
59		Nova Creu Alta	11,981	Sabadell	Catalonia	Sabadell	1967	
60		Francisco de la Hera	11,580	Almendralejo	Extremadura	CD Extremadura 1924	1996	
61		Olímpic de Terrassa	11,500	Terrassa	Catalonia	Terrassa	1960	
62		Ciudad de Tudela	11,000	Tudela (Tutera)	Navarre	CD Tudelano	1969	
63		Ciudad de Málaga	10,816	Málaga	Andalusia	Athletics	2006	
64		Pasarón	10,500	Pontevedra	Galicia	Pontevedra	1965	
65		Linarejos	10,000	Linares	Andalusia	Linares	1956	
66		Las Mestas	10,000	Gijón	Asturias	Gijón Mariners (American football); CSI Gijón (horse jumping)	1942	

== Stadiums with a capacity below 10,000 ==
Stadiums with a capacity of at least 5,000 are included.

No.	Image	Stadium	Capacity	City	County	Home team	Opened
1		Vilatenim	9,472	Figueres	Catalonia	UE Figueres	1986
2		El Alcoraz	9,100	Huesca	Aragon	SD Huesca	1972
3		La Murta	9,000	Xàtiva	Valencia	CD Olímpic	1922
4		El Toralín	8,400	Ponferrada	Castile and León	SD Ponferradina	2000
5		Los Pajaritos	8,261	Soria	Castile and León	CD Numancia	1999
6		Ipurua	8,164	Eibar	Basque Country	SD Eibar	1947
7		Francisco Artés Carrasco	8,120	Lorca	Murcia	Lorca Deportiva	2003
8		Estadio Municipal Álvarez Claro	8,000	Melilla	Melilla	UD Melilla	1945
9		Lasesarre	7,960	Barakaldo	Basque Country	Barakaldo CF	2003
10		Ruta de la Plata	7,813	Zamora	Castile and León	Zamora CF	2002
11		Antonio Domínguez Alfonso	7,500	Arona	Canary Islands	Gimnástica de Torrelavega	1969
12		Ciudad de Puertollano	7,240	Puertollano	Castile-La Mancha	CD Puertollano	2010
13		Estadio Nuevo Mirador	7,200	Algeciras	Andalusia	Algeciras CF	1999
14		Anxo Carro	7,070	Lugo	Galicia	CD Lugo	1974
15		Ciudad Deportiva de Lanzarote	7,000	Arrecife	Canary Islands	UD Lanzarote	1968
16		Estadio Príncipe Felipe	7,000	Cáceres	Extremadura	CP Cacereño	1977
17		Francisco Peraza	7,000	San Cristóbal de La Laguna	Canary Islands	CD Laguna	1984
18		Municipal de L'Hospitalet	6,740	L'Hospitalet de Llobregat	Catalonia	CE L'Hospitalet	1991
19		La Fuensanta	6,700	Cuenca	Castile-La Mancha	UB Conquense	1940
20		Narcís Sala	6,563	Barcelona	Catalonia	UE Sant Andreu	1970
21		Alfonso Murube	6,500	Ceuta	Ceuta	AD Ceuta	1997
22		La Magdalena	6,500	Novelda	Valencia	Novelda CF	1949
23		Los Cuartos	6,500	La Orotava	Canary Islands	UD Orotava	1949
24		Stadium Gall	6,500	Irun	Basque Country	Real Unión	6,344
25		El Malecón	6,007	Torrelavega	Cantabria	Gimnástica de Torrelavega	1922
26		Pedro Escartín	6,000	Guadalajara	Castile-La Mancha	CD Guadalajara	1967
27		Can Misses	6,000	Ibiza	Balearic Islands	UD Ibiza	1922
28		Alfredo Di Stéfano	6,000	Madrid	Madrid	Real Madrid Castilla	2005
29		Estadio Maspalomas	6,000	San Bartolomé de Tirajana	Canary Islands	CD Maspalomas	1950
30		Johan Cruyff	6,000	Sant Joan Despí	Catalonia	Barcelona Atlètic	2019
31		Anduva	5,759	Miranda de Ebro	Castile and León	CD Mirandés	2019
32		O Couto	5,659	Ourense	Galicia	Ourense CF; UD Ourense	1948
33		Estadio Balear	5,500	Palma	Balearic Islands	Atlético Baleares	1922
34		Nuestra Señora de la Caridad	5,500	Villarrobledo	Castile-La Mancha	CP Villarrobledo	1958
35		Virgen de las Nieves	5,500	Santa Cruz de La Palma	Canary Islands	SD Tenisca	2001
36		Salto del Caballo	5,500	Toledo	Castile-La Mancha	CD Toledo	1973
37		Fernando Torres	5,400	Fuenlabrada	Madrid	CF Fuenlabrada	2011
38		Guillermo Amor	5,383	Benidorm	Valencia	Benidorm CF	1964
39		Román Suárez Puerta	5,352	Avilés	Asturias	Real Avilés	1943
40		García Hermanos	5,000	Betanzos	Galicia	Betanzos CF	1990
41		Nou Camp de Santa Coloma	5,000	Santa Coloma de Gramenet	Catalonia	FE Grama	1994

== See also ==
- List of indoor arenas in Spain
- List of European stadiums by capacity
- List of association football stadiums by capacity
- List of association football stadiums by country
- List of sports venues by capacity
- Lists of stadiums
