= 2015–16 División de Honor B de Rugby =

2015–16 División de Honor B
- Countries: Spain
- Champions: Zarautz (Group A); La Vila (Group B); Ciencias Fundación Cajasol (Group C)
- Runners-up: UBU-Cajaviva (Group A); Sant Cugat (Group B); Liceo Francés (Group C)
- Matches played: 396 (regular season); 9 (promotion playoff)
- Top point scorer: (Argentina) Matías Jara 353
- Top try scorer: (Spain) David Camacho 27

The 2015–16 División de Honor B, the XVIII edition since its inception in 1998, began on September 19, 2015 with the first matchday of regular season and will run through 29 May with the Promotion playoffs Final. For 2015–16 season, championship comprises 3 groups of 12 teams each.

== Competition format ==
The season comprises Main stage or regular season and Promotion playoff. The regular season runs through 22 matchdays. Upon completion the regular season, the two top teams of each group and two-best 3rd placed teams qualify for promotion playoff.

Points during regular season are awarded as following;

- Each win means 4 points to winning team.
- A draw means 2 points for each team.
- 1 bonus point for a team that achieves 4 tries in a match.
- A defeat by 7 or less points means 1 bonus point for defeated team.

== Teams ==
=== Group A ===
- Teams from northern section of Spain
2015–16 group A teams

Team	Stadium	City/Area	Website	2014–15
Blusens Networks Universidade	As Lagoas-Marcosende	Vigo		R
Babyauto Zarautz	Asti	Zarautz		1st
Durango Nissan-Gaursa	Arripausueta	Durango		2nd
AVK Bera Bera	Miniestadio de Anoeta	San Sebastián		3rd
UBU-Cajaviva	San Amaro	Burgos		4th
Uribealdea	Atxurizubi	Mungia		5th
CRAT A Coruña	Acea da Ma	A Coruña		6th
Real Oviedo Rugby	El Naranco	Oviedo		7th
El Salvador B	Pepe Rojo	Valladolid		8th
VRAC Quesos Entrepinares B	Pepe Rojo	Valladolid		9th
Eibar Hierros Anetxe	Unbe	Eibar		10th
La Única	Berokizelaia	Pamplona		P

=== Group B ===
- Teams from eastern part of Spain
2015–16 group B teams

Team	Stadium	City/Area	Website	2014–15
Sant Cugat	La Guinardera	Sant Cugat del Vallès		1st
CAU Valencia	Campo del Río Turia	Valencia		2nd
La Vila	El Pantano	Villajoyosa		3rd
Les Abelles	Quatre Carreres	Valencia		4th
Tecnidex Valencia	Quatre Carreres	Valencia		5th
Barcelona Enginyers	Mar Bella	Barcelona		6th
Fénix	Pinares de Venecia	Zaragoza		7th
BUC Barcelona	La Foixarda	Barcelona		8th
Sitges	Santa Bàrbara	Sitges		9th
L'Hospitalet	Feixa Llarga	L'Hospitalet de Llobregat		10th
Santboiana B	Baldiri Aleu	Sant Boi de Llobregat		P
Químic Barcelona	La Teixonera	Barcelona		P

=== Group C ===
- Teams from southern section of Spain
2015–16 group C teams

Team	Stadium	City/Area	Website	2014–15
Ciencias Fundación Cajasol	I.D. La Cartuja	Seville		2nd
Liceo Francés	Ramón Urtubi	Madrid		3rd
Olímpico Pozuelo	Valle de las Cañas	Pozuelo de Alarcón		4th
Arquitectura	Campo Central	Madrid		5th
Helvetia	I.D La Cartuja	Seville		6th
Ingenieros Industriales	El Cantizal	Las Rozas		7th
CAU Madrid	Orcasitas	Madrid		8th
Universidad de Granada	Fuentenueva	Granada		9th
CAR Cáceres	El Cuartillo	Cáceres		10th
Complutense Cisneros Zeta	Campo Central	Madrid		11th
Atlético Portuense	Ciudad Deportiva	El Puerto de Santa María		P
URA Almería	Emilio Campra	Almería		P

== Regular season standings ==
=== Group A ===
Qualified for promotion playoff

#	Team	Games				Points			Tries			Bonus points	Points
#	Team	Played	Won	Drawn	Lost	For	Against	Difference	For	Against	Difference	Bonus points	Points
1	Babyauto Zarautz	22	21	0	1	751	280	+471	106	36	+70	15	99
2	UBU-Cajaviva	22	17	0	5	655	371	+284	92	42	+50	18	86
3	AVK Bera Bera	22	11	2	9	425	384	+41	54	50	+4	11	59
4	Uribealdea	22	11	1	10	471	372	+99	61	44	+17	11	57
5	CRAT Univ. da Coruña	22	11	2	9	432	371	+61	50	47	+3	9	57
6	Blusens Networks Universidade	22	9	0	13	449	414	35	71	55	+16	11	47
7	Real Oviedo Rugby	22	9	0	13	450	453	−3	50	63	−13	10	46
8	Durango Nissan-Gaursa	22	8	0	14	394	453	−59	56	54	+2	12	44
9	AVIA Eibar	22	9	0	13	365	575	−210	45	81	−36	5	41
10	El Salvador B	22	8	0	14	345	711	−366	47	100	−53	8	40
11	VRAC Quesos Entrepinares B	22	8	1	13	310	528	−218	36	72	−36	6	40
12	La Única	22	6	2	14	343	478	−135	47	70	−23	7	35
Source: División de Honor B – Group A

==== Group B ====
Qualified for promotion playoff

#	Team	Games				Points			Tries			Bonus points	Points
#	Team	Played	Won	Drawn	Lost	For	Against	Difference	For	Against	Difference	Bonus points	Points
1	La Vila	22	21	0	1	1005	200	+805	152	27	+125	18	102
2	Sant Cugat	22	19	0	3	685	337	+348	93	39	+54	13	89
3	CAU Valencia	22	15	0	7	831	311	+520	115	36	+79	19	79
4	Les Abelles	22	14	0	8	584	347	+237	85	46	+39	12	68
5	BUC Barcelona	22	12	1	9	518	546	−28	71	70	+1	11	61
6	Barcelona Enginyers	22	11	0	11	507	507	0	68	70	−2	11	55
7	Tecnidex Valencia	22	11	0	11	420	540	−120	61	71	−10	7	51
8	Santboiana B	22	9	0	13	415	543	−128	49	68	−19	9	45
9	L'Hospitalet	22	8	0	14	370	587	−217	50	83	−33	11	43
10	Fénix	22	7	2	13	375	631	−256	48	88	−40	6	38
11	Sitges	22	2	1	19	282	794	−512	32	113	−81	4	14
12	Químic Barcelona	22	0	2	20	228	877	−649	24	137	−113	1	5
Source: División de Honor B – Group B

==== Group C ====
Qualified for promotion playoff

#	Team	Games				Points			Tries			Bonus points	Points
#	Team	Played	Won	Drawn	Lost	For	Against	Difference	For	Against	Difference	Bonus points	Points
1	Ciencias Fundación Cajasol	22	22	0	0	1180	195	+985	183	25	+158	19	107
2	Liceo Francés	22	18	0	4	715	348	+367	112	41	+71	15	87
3	Atlético Portuense*	22	14	0	8	672	505	+167	98	71	+27	20	76
4	Arquitectura	22	12	1	9	562	549	+13	85	71	+14	15	65
5	Olímpico Pozuelo	22	11	0	11	554	535	+19	74	76	−2	10	54
6	CAR Cáceres	22	11	1	10	435	578	−143	56	79	−23	6	52
7	Ingenieros Industriales	22	10	0	12	456	521	−65	57	73	−16	9	49
8	Helvetia	22	10	0	12	490	652	−162	64	89	−25	8	48
9	Complutense Cisneros B	22	8	0	14	527	615	−88	71	92	−21	12	44
10	UR Almería	22	8	0	14	477	659	−182	54	89	−35	10	42
11	CAU Madrid	22	7	0	15	412	691	−279	53	99	−46	9	37
12	Universidad de Granada	22	0	0	22	219	851	−632	27	129	−102	7	7
Source: División de Honor B – Group C

- CR Atlético Portuense initially qualified for promotion playoff, but later declined to take part.

== Promotion playoff ==
=== Qualified teams ===
To determine pairings, teams qualified are sorted by total points.

#	Team	Games				Points			Tries			Bonus points	Points
#	Team	Played	Won	Drawn	Lost	For	Against	Difference	For	Against	Difference	Bonus points	Points
1	Ciencias Fundación Cajasol	22	22	0	0	1180	195	+985	183	25	+158	19	107
2	La Vila	22	21	0	1	1005	200	+805	152	27	+125	18	102
3	Babyauto Zarautz	22	21	0	1	751	280	+471	106	36	+70	15	99
4	Sant Cugat	22	19	0	3	685	337	+348	93	39	+54	13	89
5	Liceo Francés	22	18	0	4	715	348	+367	112	41	+71	15	87
6	UBU-Cajaviva	22	17	0	5	655	371	+284	92	42	+50	18	86
7	CAU Valencia	22	15	0	7	831	311	+520	115	36	+79	19	79

According to competition rules, pairings are based as follows:

Round	Pairing
Quarter-final
Quarter-final	A) 1st vs. 8th
Quarter-final	B) 2nd vs. 7th
Quarter-final	C) 3rd vs. 6th
Quarter-final	D) 4th vs. 5th
Semifinals
Semifinals	E) Winner A) vs. Winner D)
Semifinals	F) Winner B) vs. Winner C)
Final	G) Winner E) vs. Winner F)

=== Calendar ===
Round	Date	Fixtures	Clubs	Notes
Quarter-finals	23/24 April	3	6 → 3	Ciencias Fundación Cajasol receive a bye to Semifinals as the best overall team.
Quarter-finals	30 April/1 May	3	6 → 3	Ciencias Fundación Cajasol receive a bye to Semifinals as the best overall team.
Semifinals	7/8 May	2	4 → 2	Ciencias Fundación Cajasol gain entry.
Semifinals	14/15 May	2	4 → 2	Ciencias Fundación Cajasol gain entry.
Final	21/22 May	1	2 → 1	
Final	28/29 May	1	2 → 1	

=== Quarter finals ===
Team 1	Agg.	Team 2	1st leg	2nd leg
~~La Vila~~ (Valencian Community)	29–19	(Valencian Community) CAU Valencia	14–13	15–6
Babyauto Zarautz (Basque Country (autonomous community))	33–45	(Castile and León) UBU-Cajaviva	12–15	21–30
Sant Cugat (Catalonia)	11–20	(Community of Madrid) Liceo Francés	3–12	8–18

- CR La Vila, disqualified for fielding an ineligible player. CAU Valencia advanced to next round.

Teams qualified to Semifinals
~~La Vila~~	UBU-Cajaviva	Liceo Francés

=== Semifinals ===
Team 1	Agg.	Team 2	1st leg	2nd leg
Ciencias Fundación Cajasol (Andalusia)	39–19	(Community of Madrid) Liceo Francés	16–12	23–7
UBU-Cajaviva (Castile and León)	40–50	(Valencian Community) CAU Valencia	23–23	17–27

==== Matches ====
===== 1st leg =====
May 8, 2016	CAU Valencia	23–23	UBU-Cajaviva	Campo del Río Turia, Valencia
11:30 (UTC+2)		Boxscore		Referee: Ignacio Muñoz (Madrid)

May 8, 2016	Liceo Francés	12–16	Ciencias Fundación Cajasol	Ramón Urtubi, Madrid
13:30 (UTC+2)		Boxscore		Referee: Luis Santos (Castile and León)

===== 2nd leg =====
May 15, 2016	UBU-Cajaviva	17–27	CAU Valencia	San Amaro, Burgos
12:00 (UTC+2)		Boxscore		Referee: Alhambra Nievas (Andalusia)

May 15, 2016	Ciencias Fundación Cajasol	23–7	Liceo Francés	La Cartuja, Seville
13:30 (UTC+2)		Boxscore		Referee: Joaquín Santoro (Valencia)

Teams qualified to Final
Ciencias Fundación Cajasol	CAU Valencia

=== Final ===
Team 1	Agg.	Team 2	1st leg	2nd leg
Ciencias Fundación Cajasol (Andalusia)	38–37	(Valencian Community) CAU Valencia	15–22	23–15

==== 1st leg ====
May 22, 2016	CAU Valencia	22–15	Ciencias Fundación Cajasol	Campo del Río Turia, Valencia
tba (UTC+2)	Try: A Sorribes 74' c Con: E Sorribes (1/1) 74'; Pen: E Sorribes (4/4) 5', 40', 43', 51'; Drop: Casanova 36'	Boxscore	Try: Ortega 12' c Morán 59'; Con: Rivero (1/2) 13'; Pen: Rivero (1/1) 21'	Referee: Félix Villegas (Castile and León)

==== 2nd leg ====
May 29, 2016	Ciencias Fundación Cajasol	23–15 (a.e.t.)	CAU Valencia	La Cartuja, Seville
12:00 (UTC+2)	Try: Herrero 32' c Vázquez 95' c Con: Mazo (2/2) 32', 95'; Pen: Mazo (3/3) 52', 65', 77'	Boxscore	Pen: Sorribes (5/6) 25', 35', 40', 87', 89'	Referee: Alfonso Mirat (Madrid)

Promoted to División de Honor
Ciencias Fundación Cajasol
(2 years later)

- CAU Valencia play the relegation/promotion playoff against Bizkaia Gernika.

== Scorers statistics ==
=== Top try scorers ===
Rank	Player	Tries	Team
1	(Spain) David Camacho	27	Atlético Portuense
2	(Argentina) Matías Jara	23	La Vila
3	(Spain) Alejandro Ortega	22	Ciencias Sevilla
4	(Spain) Lee Lay	20	Arquitectura
5	(Spain) Antxon Iriondo	17	Durango Nissan-Gaursa
5	(Spain) Pau Anguita	17	Barcelona Enginyers
5	(Spain) Luis Vázquez	17	Ciencias Sevilla
8	(Argentina) Juan Gabriel Aristemuño	16	UBU-Cajaviva
8	(New Zealand) Phillip Huxford	16	Babyauto Zarautz
8	(Tonga) Falemaka Tatafu	16	Blusens Networks Universidade

=== Top points scorers ===
Rank	Player	Points	Team
1	(Argentina) Matías Jara	353	La Vila
2	(Spain) Eduardo Sorribes	312	CAU Valencia
3	(Argentina) Lucas Panichelli	270	Babyauto Zarautz
4	(Spain) Iñaki Berasategui	211	Sant Cugat
5	(Spain) Nacho de Luque	207	URA Almería
6	(Spain) Alfonso Menéndez	185	Real Oviedo Rugby
7	(Spain) Mikel Álvarez	179	UBU-Cajaviva
8	(Spain) José de la Cueva	172	Atlético Portuense
9	(Spain) Luis Gascón	167	CRAT A Coruña
10	(Spain) Eduardo Lasanta	165	Ingenieros Industriales

== See also ==
- 2015–16 División de Honor de Rugby
