= Quimic Equip Rugby =

Spanish rugby union club, based in Barcelona

- Founded: 1987; 39 years ago
- Location: Barcelona, Spain
- President: Carlos Palacín
- Coach: David Nicolas
- League: División de Honor B de Rugby
Team kit

Quimic Equip Rugby is a Spanish rugby union team based in Barcelona.
