= Zarautz RT =

Spanish rugby union club, based in Zarautz

Gesalaga Okelan Zarautz RT
- Full name: Zarautz Rugby Taldea
- Founded: 1977; 49 years ago
- Location: Zarautz, Spain
- Ground: Instalaciones Deportivas Asti
- President: Daniel Higon
- Coach: Fran Puertas
- League: División de Honor B – Group A
- 2022-23: División de Honor B – Group A, 1st
Team kit

Zarautz Rugby Taldea (known as Gesalaga Okelan Zarautz RT for sponsorship reasons) is a Spanish rugby union team based in Zarautz.

== History ==
The club was founded in 1977.

== Season by season ==
Season	Tier	Division	Pos.	Notes
2004–05	3	Primera Nacional	8th	Relegated
2005–08	4	Segunda Nacional		
2008–09	3	Primera Nacional	2nd	
2009–10	3	Primera Nacional	3rd	
2010–11	3	Primera Nacional	3rd	
2011–12	3	Primera Nacional	3rd	
2012–13	3	Primera Nacional	1st	Promoted
2013–14	2	División de Honor B	4th	
2014–15	2	División de Honor B	1st	
2015–16	2	División de Honor B	1st	
2016–17	2	División de Honor B	2nd	
2017–18	2	División de Honor B	4th	

Season	Tier	Division	Pos.	Notes
2018–19	2	División de Honor B	6th	
2019-20	2	División de Honor B	4th	
2020-21	2	División de Honor B	10th	
2021-22	2	División de Honor B	6th	
2022-23	2	División de Honor B	2nd (Group Élite)	
2023-24	2	División de Honor B	9th (Group Élite)	
2024-25	2	División de Honor B	-	

- 12 seasons in División de Honor B
