= Tasman Rugby Boadilla =

Spanish rugby union club, based in Boadilla del Monte

- Full name: Club Deportivo Elementas Boadilla Tasman Rugby
- Founded: 2001; 25 years ago
- Location: Boadilla del Monte, Spain
- Ground: Complejo Deportivo de Boadilla del Monte
- President: Federico Grand
- Coach: Ángel Martin
- League: 2º División Madrileña
- 2023–24: 3rd-Grupo Ascenso
Team kit

Tasman Rugby Boadilla is a Spanish rugby union team based in Boadilla del Monte. They currently compete in the 2nd Madrid Rugby Division (4th Spanish category).

== History ==
TASMAN Rugby Boadilla was established in September 2001, with the idea of bringing rugby closer to children and forming a stable and competitive team in the long term.

TASMAN Rugby Boadilla has become in recent years one of the first schools in the northwest of Madrid (both in number of licenses and results). The successes in its lower categories (runners-up in Spain in the cadet category in the 2007/2008 season and third in the same category in 2009/2010) and the promotion to División de Honor B of its senior team in 2013/2014, have led to a great development.

== Season to season ==
Season	Tier	Division	Pos.	Notes
2013–14	3	Primera Nacional	3rd	Promoted
2014–15	2	División de Honor B	12th	Relegated
2015–16	2	1ª División Madrid		

- 1 seasons in División de Honor B
