= RC Sitges =

Rugby union club in Catalonia, Spain

Sitges
- Full name: Rugby Club Sitges
- Founded: 1987; 39 years ago
- Location: Sitges, Catalonia
- Ground: Nou Santa Bàrbara
- President: Alejandro Villareal
- Coach: Diego Godoy
- League: 1st Catalan Regional
- 2023–24: 5th
1st kit	2nd kit

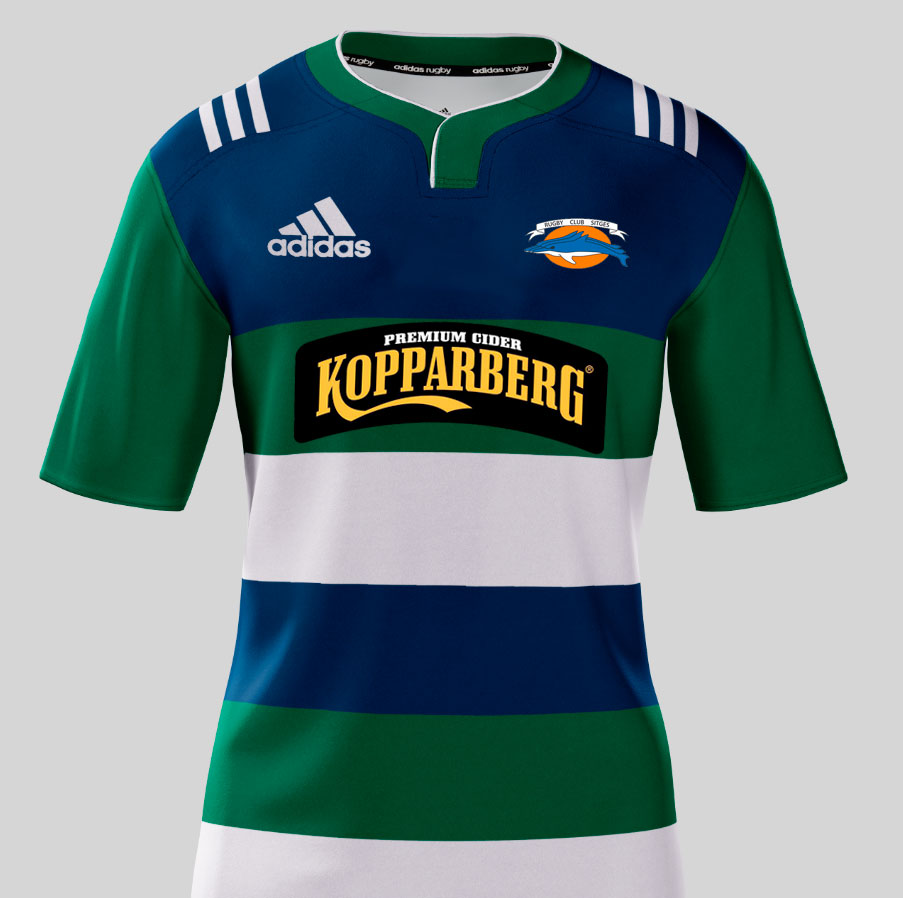
Sitges Rugby Club Jersey

Rugby Club Sitges is a Catalan rugby union team based in Sitges that competes in the Divisió d'Honor Catalana, the third-tier in the State.

== History ==
The team was established in 1987.

In 2002, the club relocated to the Santa Bàrbara field in the northern part of the town, which was subsequently renovated in 2022 with funding from the Sitges City Council.

Prior to 2022, the team hosted its home games in the nearby town of Viladecans.

The club's most recent achievement came in 2021, when they claimed the Divisió d'Honor Catalana championship.

They were relegated back to the third division of rugby in the State, however, in 2023.

The ground held the Catalan Supercup between UE Santboiana and FC Barcelona Rugby.

== Season to season ==
Season	Tier	Division	Pos.	Notes
2004–05	3	Primera Nacional	8th	Relegated
2005–08	4	Segunda Nacional		
2008–09	3	Primera Nacional	4th	
2009–10	3	Primera Nacional	2nd	
2010–11	3	Primera Nacional	4th	
2011–12	3	Primera Nacional	6th	
2012–13	3	Primera Nacional	4th	
2013–14	3	Primera Nacional	4th	Promoted
2014–15	2	División de Honor B	9th	
2015–16	2	División de Honor B	11th	Relegated

- 2 seasons in División de Honor B
