= 2012–13 División de Honor B de Rugby =

2012–13 División de Honor B
- Countries: Spain
- Champions: Independiente (Group A); Alcobendas (Group B)
- Runners-up: Sant Cugat (Group A); Les Abelles (Group B)
- Matches played: 162 (regular season) / 168 (with playoffs)

The 2012–13 División de Honor B, the XV edition, began on October 13, 2012, with the first matchday of regular season and finished on May 5, 2013, with the Promotion playoffs final.

== Competition format ==
The regular season runs through 18 matchdays. Upon completion the regular season, the two top teams of each group play a promotion playoff consisting of semifinal and final. The final winner is promoted to División de Honor while the loser team play the promotion playoff against the team qualified 11th in División de Honor. Teams in 9th & 10th standings play the relegation playoff to Primera Nacional.

- Each win means 4 points to winning team.
- A draw means 2 points for each team.
- 1 bonus point for a team that achieves 4 tries in a match.
- A defeat by 7 or less points means 1 bonus point for defeated team.

== 2012–13 season teams ==
=== Group A ===
- Teams from northern section of Spain

Team	Stadium	City/Area	Website	2011–12
Pegamo Bera Bera	Miniestadio de Anoeta	San Sebastián	http://www.berabera.com/	2nd
Oviedo TRADEHI	El Naranco	Oviedo	https://www.oviedorugby.com/	3rd
Bathco Independiente	Mies de Cozada	Santander	http://www.independienterugbyclub.eu/	4th
FC Barcelona	La Teixonera	Barcelona	http://www.fcbrugby.com/	6th
L'Hospitalet	Feixa Llarga	L'Hospitalet de Llobregat	http://www.rugbyhospitalet.com/	7th
Durango Ilarduya	Arripausueta	Durango	https://durangorugby.eus/	8th
Barcelona UC	La Foixarda	Barcelona	https://buc.cat/	P
CRAT Universidade da Coruña	Acea da Ma	A Coruña	http://www.cratcoruna.com/	P
Eibar Hierros Anetxe	Unbe	Eibar	http://www.eibarugby.com/	P
Sant Cugat	La Guinardera	Sant Cugat del Vallès	https://rugbysantcugat.com/es/	P

- Hercesa moved to Group B.

==== Final standings ====
	Team	Pld	W	D	L	PF	PA	Dif	Bonus	Pts
1	Bathco Independiente	18	15	1	2	623	278	345	10	72
2	Sant Cugat	18	10	3	5	628	324	304	15	61
3	Oviedo TRADEHI	18	11	1	6	457	361	96	10	56
4	FC Barcelona	18	10	1	7	485	324	161	9	51
5	Eibar Hierros Anetxe	18	10	1	7	380	321	59	8	50
6	L'Hospitalet	18	10	0	8	380	319	61	10	50
7	Pegamo Bera Bera	18	10	0	8	299	406	−107	6	46
8	CRAT Universidade da Coruña	18	7	1	10	355	402	−47	4	34
9	Barcelona UC	18	2	0	16	344	615	−271	9	17
10	Durango Ilarduya	18	1	0	17	189	790	−601	1	5

Source: Federación Española de Rugby

Qualified for Promotion playoffs

=== Group B ===
- Teams from southern section of Spain

Team	Stadium	City/Area	Website	2011–12
Alcobendas	Las Terrazas	Alcobendas	http://www.alcobendasrugby.com/	10th
Liceo Francés	Ramón Urtubi	Madrid	http://www.liceo.com/	3rd
Les Abelles	Quatre Carreres	Valencia	http://www.lesabelles.net/	4th
CAU Valencia	Campo del Río Turia	Valencia	http://www.caurugbyvalencia.com/	5th
~~Hercesa~~	Antonio Machado	Alcalá de Henares	http://cdhercesa.com/	5th*
Atlético Portuense	Polideportivo Municipal	El Puerto de Santa María	https://www.craportuense.com/	6th
Arquitectura	Estadio Nacional Complutense	Madrid	http://www.arquitectura-rugby.org/	7th
Helvetia	Instalaciones Deportivas "La Cartuja"	Seville	http://www.clubamigosrugby.com/	8th
Universidad de Granada	Fuentenueva	Granada	http://www.rugbyuniversidadgr.es.tl/	P
Ingenieros Industriales	El Cantizal	Las Rozas	http://www.iirugby.com/	P

==== Final standings ====
	Team	Pld	W	D	L	PF	PA	Dif	Bonus	Pts
1	Alcobendas	16	14	2	0	740	174	566	13	73
2	Les Abelles	16	12	1	3	457	230	227	8	58
3	CAU Valencia	16	11	1	4	435	213	222	9	55
4	Arquitectura	16	9	1	6	433	405	28	9	47
5	Atlético Portuense	16	9	0	7	299	314	−15	5	41
6	Liceo Francés	16	7	0	9	240	350	−110	6	34
7	Universidad de Granada	16	3	0	13	205	416	−211	6	18
8	Ingenieros Industriales	16	2	0	14	221	554	−333	7	15
9	Helvetia	16	2	1	13	201	575	−374	3	13

Source: Federación Española de Rugby

Qualified for Promotion playoffs

== Promotion playoffs ==
Semifinals
Sant Cugat	20	17	37
Alcobendas	24	24	48
Les Abelles	14	12	26
Bathco Independiente	36	42	78

Final
Alcobendas	8	13	21
Bathco Independiente	13	12	25

=== Semifinals ===
==== 1st leg ====
April 13, 2013
17:00 (UTC+2)

Sant Cugat	20–24	Alcobendas

La Guinardera, Sant Cugat

April 14, 2013
12:30 (UTC+2)

Les Abelles	14–36	Bathco Independiente

Quatre Carreres, Valencia

==== 2nd leg ====
April 20, 2013
16:00 (UTC+2)

Alcobendas	24–17	Sant Cugat

Las Terrazas, Alcobendas

Alcobendas won 48–37 on aggregate and advanced to Final.

April 21, 2013
13:00 (UTC+2)

Bathco Independiente	42–12	Les Abelles

San Román, Santander

Bathco Independiente won 78–26 on aggregate and advanced to Final.

=== Final ===
Winning team will be promoted to División de Honor for 2013–14 season. Loser team will get a new chance to achieve promotion, playing a playoff against Hernani CRE for a single spot in División de Honor.

==== 1st leg ====
April 28, 2013
12:30 (UTC+2)

Alcobendas	8–13	Bathco Independiente

Las Terrazas, Alcobendas

==== 2nd leg ====
May 5, 2013
10:00 (UTC+2)

Bathco Independiente	12–13	Alcobendas
	Report

El Sardinero, Santander

Bathco Independiente won 25–21 on aggregate and got promoted to División de Honor.

Promoted to División de Honor
Bathco Independiente
(33 years later)

== See also ==
- 2012–13 División de Honor de Rugby
- División de Honor B de Rugby
