= 2014–15 División de Honor B de Rugby =

Match of Division de Honor B de Rugby, 2014-15

2014–15 División de Honor B
- Countries: Spain
- Champions: Zarautz (Group A); Sant Cugat (Group B); Alcobendas (Group C)
- Runners-up: Durango (Group A); CAU Valencia (Group B); Ciencias Fundación Cajasol (Group C)
- Matches played: 354 (regular season); 13 (2nd stage); 1 (final)
- Top point scorer: (Czech Republic) Mohamed Samet 240
- Top try scorer: (Spain) Lee Lay 41

The 2014–15 División de Honor B, the XVII edition, began on September 13, 2014 with the first matchday of regular season and finished on May 23, 2015 with the Promotion playoffs final. For 2014–15 season, the championship expands to 3 groups of 10/12 teams each.

Alcobendas Rugby won the promotion playoff to Sant Cugat 18–13 and returned to División de Honor three years after of relegation.

== Competition format ==
The season comprises Main stage or regular season, 2nd stage and Final. The regular season runs through 22 matchdays (groups A and C) and 18 matchdays (Group B). Upon completion the regular season, the two top teams of each group qualify for 2nd stage. 2nd stage features two groups of three teams each, in a round-robin format, playing each team 4 matches in total. Top team of each group play the Final with the winner team being promoted to División de Honor while the loser team play the promotion playoff against the team qualified 11th in División de Honor. Teams qualified in 10th, 11th & 12th in the standings play the relegation playoff to Primera Nacional.

Points during regular season are awarded as following;

- Each win means 4 points to winning team.
- A draw means 2 points for each team.
- 1 bonus point for a team that achieves 4 tries in a match.
- A defeat by 7 or less points means 1 bonus point for defeated team.

== Teams ==
=== Group A ===
- Teams from northern section of Spain
2014–15 group A teams

Team	Stadium	City/Area	Website	2013–14
AVK Bera Bera	Miniestadio de Anoeta	San Sebastián		1st
Uribealdea	Atxurizubi	Mungia		2nd
Eibar Hierros Anetxe	Unbe	Eibar		3rd
Babyauto Zarautz	Asti	Zarautz		4th
CRAT Univ. da Coruña	Acea da Ma	A Coruña		5th
Real Oviedo Rugby	El Naranco	Oviedo		6th
Durango	Arripausueta	Durango		7th
Oxigar Belenos	Muro de Zaro	Avilés		P
Aparejadores Burgos	San Amaro	Burgos		P
VRAC Quesos Entrepinares B	Pepe Rojo	Valladolid		P
Bathco Rugby B	Mies de Cozada	Santander		P
Hermi El Salvador B	Pepe Rojo	Valladolid		P

=== Group B ===
- Teams from eastern section of Spain
2014–15 group B teams

Team	Stadium	City/Area	Website	2013–14
Sant Cugat	La Guinardera	Sant Cugat del Vallès		2nd
La Vila	El Pantano	Villajoyosa		3rd
CAU Valencia	Campo del Río Turia	Valencia		4th
Les Abelles	Quatre Carreres	Valencia		5th
Tecnidex Valencia	Quatre Carreres	Valencia		6th
L'Hospitalet	Feixa Llarga	L'Hospitalet de Llobregat		7th
Poble Nou-Enginyers	Mar Bella	Barcelona		8th
BUC Barcelona	La Foixarda	Barcelona		9th
Fénix	Pinares de Venecia	Zaragoza		P
Sitges	Santa Bàrbara	Sitges		P

=== Group C ===
- Teams from southern section of Spain
2014–15 group C teams

Team	Stadium	City/Area	Website	2013–14
Alcobendas	Las Terrazas	Alcobendas		1st
CAU Madrid	Orcasitas	Madrid		3rd
Helvetia	I.D. La Cartuja	Seville		4th
Arquitectura	Campo Central	Madrid		5th
Ingenieros Industriales	El Cantizal	Las Rozas		6th
Liceo Francés	Ramón Urtubi	Madrid		7th
Universidad de Granada	Fuentenueva	Granada		8th
Ciencias Fundación Cajasol	I.D La Cartuja	Seville		R
Olímpico Pozuelo	Valle de las Cañas	Pozuelo de Alarcón		P
Complutense Cisneros B	Campo Central	Madrid		P
Tasman Boadilla	Complejo Deportivo	Boadilla del Monte		P
CAR Cáceres	El Cuartillo	Cáceres		P

== Standings ==
=== Regular season ===
==== Group A ====
Qualified for 2nd Stage

#	Team	Games				Points			Tries			Bonus points	Points
#	Team	Played	Won	Drawn	Lost	For	Against	Difference	For	Against	Difference	Bonus points	Points
1	Babyauto Zarautz	22	21	0	1	769	232	+537	105	27	+78	14	98
2	Durango	22	18	1	3	597	253	+344	92	27	+65	15	89
3	AVK Bera Bera	22	16	0	6	677	244	+433	99	26	+73	16	80
4	Aparejadores Burgos	22	13	1	8	533	364	+169	73	47	+26	8	62
5	Uribealdea	22	12	1	9	649	364	+285	80	43	+37	11	61
6	CRAT Univ. da Coruña	22	12	0	10	398	341	57	50	43	+7	6	54
7	Real Oviedo Rugby	22	10	0	12	421	520	−99	56	71	−15	7	47
8	Hermi El Salvador B	22	9	0	13	334	550	−216	46	80	−34	9	45
9	VRAC Quesos Entrepinares B	22	8	1	13	333	438	−105	42	62	−20	9	43
10	Eibar Hierros Anetxe	22	6	0	16	297	499	−202	37	68	−31	7	31
11	Oxigar Belenos	22	5	0	17	349	598	−249	43	77	−34	8	28
12	Bathco Rugby B	22	0	0	22	197	1151	−954	28	180	−152	5	5
Source: División de Honor B – Group A

==== Group B ====
Qualified for 2nd Stage

#	Team	Games				Points			Tries			Bonus points	Points
#	Team	Played	Won	Drawn	Lost	For	Against	Difference	For	Against	Difference	Bonus points	Points
1	Sant Cugat	18	16	0	2	575	284	+291	82	34	+48	14	78
2	CAU Valencia	18	16	0	2	605	230	+375	87	30	+57	13	77
3	La Vila	18	16	0	2	626	163	+463	88	21	+67	12	76
4	Les Abelles	18	8	0	10	366	392	−26	48	54	−6	10	42
5	Tecnidex Valencia	18	8	0	10	337	313	+24	48	33	+15	9	41
6	Poble Nou-Enginyers	18	7	0	11	305	420	−115	36	56	−20	5	33
7	Fénix	18	5	0	13	223	483	−260	31	67	−36	6	26
8	BUC Barcelona	18	4	0	14	324	441	−117	38	62	−24	10	26
9	Sitges	18	5	0	13	230	548	−318	21	75	−54	4	24
10	L'Hospitalet	18	5	0	13	174	491	−317	19	66	−47	1	21
Source: División de Honor B – Group B

==== Group C ====
Qualified for 2nd Stage

#	Team	Games				Points			Tries			Bonus points	Points
#	Team	Played	Won	Drawn	Lost	For	Against	Difference	For	Against	Difference	Bonus points	Points
1	Alcobendas	22	22	0	0	1234	224	+1010	190	29	+161	21	109
2	Ciencias Fundación Cajasol	22	18	0	4	714	341	+373	103	49	+54	15	87
3	Liceo Francés	22	13	0	9	483	513	−30	69	65	+4	10	62
4	Olímpico Pozuelo	22	12	1	9	519	492	+27	69	73	−4	12	62
5	Arquitectura	22	12	0	10	566	544	+22	88	80	+8	13	61
6	Helvetia	22	9	1	12	439	582	−143	56	78	−22	8	46
7	Ingenieros Industriales	22	7	2	13	465	567	−102	68	76	−8	13	45
8	CAU Madrid	22	9	0	13	416	576	−160	59	82	−23	8	44
9	Universidad de Granada	22	8	0	14	386	628	−242	48	98	−50	8	40
10	CAR Cáceres	22	7	0	15	366	545	−179	44	82	−38	10	38
11	Complutense Cisneros B	22	6	1	15	441	627	−186	66	95	−29	12	38
12	Tasman Boadilla	22	6	1	15	388	778	−390	60	113	−53	5	31
Source: División de Honor B – Group C

=== 2nd phase ===
==== Group A ====
Qualified for Final

#	Team	Games				Points			Tries			Bonus points	Points
#	Team	Played	Won	Drawn	Lost	For	Against	Difference	For	Against	Difference	Bonus points	Points
1	Alcobendas	4	3	0	1	86	34	+52	11	3	+8	3	15
2	Babyauto Zarautz	4	2	0	2	50	89	−39	6	12	−6	0	8
3	CAU Valencia	4	1	0	3	69	82	−13	8	10	−2	2	6
Source: División de Honor B – 2nd stage – Group A

==== Group B ====
Qualified for Final

#	Team	Games				Points			Tries			Bonus points	Points
#	Team	Played	Won	Drawn	Lost	For	Against	Difference	For	Against	Difference	Bonus points	Points
1	Sant Cugat	4	4	0	0	141	70	+71	22	11	+11	4	20
2	Ciencias Fundación Cajasol	4	1	0	3	70	81	−11	11	12	−1	3	7
3	Durango	4	1	0	3	51	111	−60	9	19	−10	1	5
Source: División de Honor B – 2nd stage – Group B

== Final ==
May 23, 2015	Alcobendas	18–13	Sant Cugat	Estadio Nelson Mandela, Tudela
17:30 (UTC+2)	Try: Rado 11'; Ati 25' c Con: Ati (1/2) 25'; Pen: Ati (1/1) 68'; Drop: Ati (1/1) 30'	Report	Try: Velázquez 16'; Raya 36'; Pen: Louteiro (1/1) 32'	Attendance: 500; Referee: Fernando Raposo (Castilla y León)

Promoted to División de Honor
Alcobendas
(3 years later)

- Sant Cugat play the relegation/promotion playoff against FC Barcelona.

== Scorers statistics ==
=== Top try scorers ===
Rank	Player	Tries	Team
1	(Spain) Lee Lay	41	Arquitectura
2	(Spain) Pedro Martín	19	Alcobendas
2	(Spain) Antxon Iriondo	19	Durango
4	(Spain) Diego García	18	Alcobendas
5	(Spain) Manuel Sobrino	17	Ciencias Fundación Cajasol
5	(Spain) Alejandro Lázaro	17	Alcobendas
7	(Spain) Rodrigo Rosso	16	Tecnidex Valencia
8	(Spain) Juan Pablo Pistone	15	BUC Barcelona
8	(Spain) Gonzalo Bermejo	15	Alcobendas
8	(New Zealand) Glen Rolls	15	Alcobendas
8	(Spain) Xanti Irazusta	15	Zarautz

=== Top points scorers ===
Rank	Player	Points	Team
1	(Czech Republic) Mohamed Samet	240	Uribealdea
2	(Argentina) Lucas Panichelli	227	Zarautz
3	(Argentina) Ati	218	Alcobendas
4	(Spain) Rafael Rivero	215	Ciencias Fundación Cajasol
5	(Spain) Lee Lay	207	Arquitectura
6	(Spain) Gonzalo Rivilla	180	Olímpico Pozuelo
7	(Spain) Gaizka Iturriaga	171	Durango
8	(Spain) Eduardo Sorribes	162	CAU Valencia
9	(Australia) James Devlin	159	Aparejadores Burgos
10	(Argentina) Malcolm Van Steeden	134	Sitges

== See also ==
- 2014–15 División de Honor de Rugby
