= 2013–14 División de Honor B de Rugby =

2013–14 División de Honor B
- Countries: Spain
- Champions: FC Barcelona (Group 1); Sant Cugat (Group 2)
- Runners-up: Pegamo Bera Bera (Group 1); Uribealdea (Group 2)
- Matches played: 184 (regular season); 12 (2nd stage); 1 (final)

The 2013–14 División de Honor B, the XVI edition, began on October 12, 2013 with the first matchday of regular season and finished on May 25, 2014 with the Promotion playoffs final. For 2013–14 season, the championship expands to 3 groups of 8/9 teams each.

FC Barcelona achieved the promotion to División de Honor six years after by defeating Sant Cugat 40–21 in the promotion playoff Final.

== Competition format ==
The season comprises 1st stage or regular season, 2nd stage and Final. The regular season runs through 18 matchdays. Upon completion the regular season, the two top teams of each group play the 2nd stage. 2nd stage features two groups of three teams each. Top team of each group play the Final with the winner team being promoted to División de Honor while the loser team play the promotion playoff against the team qualified 11th in División de Honor. Teams qualified in 8th & 9th in the standings play the relegation playoff to Primera Nacional.

Points during regular season are awarded as following;

- Each win means 4 points to winning team.
- A draw means 2 points for each team.
- 1 bonus point for a team that achieves 4 tries in a match.
- A defeat by 7 or less points means 1 bonus point for defeated team.

== Teams ==
=== Group North ===
- Teams from northern section of Spain
2013–14 group north teams

Team	Stadium	City/Area	Website	2012–13
Oviedo	El Naranco	Oviedo		3rd
Eibar Hierros Anetxe	Unbe	Eibar		6th
Pegamo Bera Bera	Miniestadio de Anoeta	San Sebastián		7th
CRAT Univ. da Coruña	Acea da Ma	A Coruña		8th
Durango	Arripausueta	Durango		10th
Uribealdea	Atxurizubi	Mungia		P
Babyauto Zarautz	Asti	Zarautz		P
Universitario Bilbao	El Fango	Bilbao		P

=== Group East ===
- Teams from eastern section of Spain
2013–14 group east teams

Team	Stadium	City/Area	Website	2012–13
Sant Cugat	La Guinardera	Sant Cugat del Vallès		2nd
Les Abelles	Quatre Carreres	Valencia		2nd
CAU Valencia	Campo del Río Turia	Valencia		3rd
FC Barcelona	La Teixonera	Barcelona		4th
L'Hospitalet	Feixa Llarga	L'Hospitalet de Llobregat		5th
Barcelona UC–Ubae	La Foixarda	Barcelona		9th
La Vila	El Pantano	Villajoyosa		R
Tecnidex Valencia	Quatre Carreres	Valencia		P
Poble Nou-Enginyers	Mar Bella	Barcelona		P

=== Group South ===
- Teams from southern section of Spain
2013–14 group south teams

Team	Stadium	City/Area	Website	2012–13
Alcobendas	Las Terrazas	Alcobendas		1st
Arquitectura	Campo Central	Madrid		4th
Atlético Portuense	Polideportivo Municipal	Pto. de Sta. María		5th
Liceo Francés	Ramón Urtubi	Madrid		6th
Universidad de Granada	Fuentenueva	Granada		7th
Helvetia	I.D La Cartuja	Seville		8th
Ingenieros Industriales	El Cantizal	Las Rozas		9th
XV Sanse Scrum	Dehesa Boyal	S.S. de los Reyes		P
CAU Madrid	Orcasitas	Madrid		P

== Standings ==
=== Regular season ===
==== Group North ====
	Team	Pld	W	D	L	PF	PA	Dif	Bonus	Pts
1	Pegamo Bera Bera	14	13	0	1	614	152	462	11	63
2	Uribealdea	14	12	0	2	400	134	266	7	55
3	Eibar Hierros Anetxe	14	9	0	5	305	229	76	7	43
4	Babyauto Zarautz	14	7	2	5	324	240	84	5	37
5	CRAT Univ. da Coruña	14	5	1	8	310	342	−32	8	30
6	Oviedo	14	4	1	9	224	396	−172	5	23
7	Durango	14	4	0	10	213	391	−178	5	21
8	Universitario Bilbao	14	0	0	14	137	643	−506	1	1

Source: Federación Española de Rugby

Qualified for 2nd phase

==== Group East ====
	Team	Pld	W	D	L	PF	PA	Dif	Bonus	Pts
1	FC Barcelona	16	13	0	3	564	249	315	10	62
2	Sant Cugat	16	12	0	4	572	274	298	14	62
3	La Vila	16	12	0	4	451	241	210	12	57
4	CAU Valencia	16	11	0	5	487	319	168	9	53
5	Les Abelles	16	11	0	5	391	284	107	8	53
6	Tecnidex Valencia	16	4	1	11	303	412	−109	8	26
7	L'Hospitalet	16	5	0	11	234	398	−164	5	25
8	Poble Nou-Enginyers	16	3	0	13	272	554	−282	2	14
9	Barcelona UC–Ubae	16	0	1	15	199	742	−543	2	4

Source: Federación Española de Rugby

Qualified for 2nd phase

==== Group South ====
	Team	Pld	W	D	L	PF	PA	Dif	Bonus	Pts
1	Alcobendas	16	15	1	0	601	141	460	14	76
2	Atlético Portuense	16	11	1	4	434	319	115	10	56
3	CAU Madrid	16	11	0	5	418	372	46	12	56
4	Helvetia	16	8	0	8	355	333	22	10	42
5	Arquitectura	16	6	0	10	301	442	−141	8	32
6	Ingenieros Industriales	16	5	1	10	313	434	−121	9	31
7	Liceo Francés	16	6	1	9	246	365	−119	4	30
8	Univ. de Granada	16	5	0	11	288	403	−115	8	28
9	XV Sanse Scrum	16	3	0	13	223	370	−147	6	18

Source: Federación Española de Rugby

Qualified for 2nd phase

=== 2nd phase ===
==== Group 1 ====
	Team	Pld	W	D	L	PF	PA	Dif	Bonus	Pts
1	Sant Cugat	4	4	0	0	169	56	113	3	19
2	Pegamo Bera Bera	4	2	0	2	114	51	63	3	11
3	Atlético Portuense	4	0	0	4	54	217	−163	1	1

Source: Federación Española de Rugby

Qualified for Final

==== Group 2 ====
	Team	Pld	W	D	L	PF	PA	Dif	Bonus	Pts
1	FC Barcelona	4	3	0	1	155	47	108	4	16
2	Uribealdea	4	2	0	2	78	126	−48	0	8
3	Alcobendas	4	1	0	3	59	119	−60	2	6

Source: Federación Española de Rugby

Qualified for Final

== Final ==
May 25, 2014
12:30 (UTC+2)

FC Barcelona	40–21	Sant Cugat
	Report

La Foixarda, Barcelona

Promoted to División de Honor
FC Barcelona
(6 years later)

- Sant Cugat play the relegation/promotion playoff against Blusens Universidade Vigo.

== See also ==
- 2013–14 División de Honor de Rugby
