= Barcelona Enginyers Rugby =

Spanish rugby union club, based in Barcelona

- Founded: 1989; 37 years ago
- Location: Barcelona, Spain
- Ground: Mar Bella
- President: Gonçal Fernández (1989-2015) and Vicenç Adelantado (2015-2017)
- Coach: Jordi Sanchez
- League: División de Honor B
Team kit

Barcelona Enginyers Rugby is a Catalan rugby union team based in Barcelona.

== History ==
The club was founded in 1989 under the name of Enginyers RC. It played under this name until 1998, when it became part of the rugby section of CN Poble Nou, under the name CNPN-Enginyers, until 2015 when it was renamed Barcelona Enginyers Rugby. In 2017 the club agreed to its complete absorption by CN Poble Nou, putting an end to its history.
