= Uribealdea RKE =

Spanish rugby union club, based in Mungia

Uribealdea R.K.E
- Full name: Uribealdea Rugby Kirol Elkartea
- Founded: 2008; 18 years ago
- Location: Lemoniz, Spain
- Ground(s): Atxurizubi, Ardanzas Park
- Chairman: Francisco Alemán
- Coach: Joseba Egurrola
- League: División de Honor B – Group A
- 2014–15: División de Honor B – Group A, 5th
Team kit

Uribealdea Rugby Kirol Elkartea is a Spanish rugby union team based in Mungia.

== History ==
The club was established in 2008 through a merger of Mungia RT and Kakarraldo Rugby Taldea .

== Season to season ==
Season	Tier	Division	Pos.	Notes
2009–10	3	Primera Nacional	1st	Promoted
2010–11	2	División de Honor B	8th	Relegated
2011–12	3	Primera Nacional	4th	
2012–13	3	Primera Nacional	2nd	Promoted
2013–14	2	División de Honor B	2nd	
2014–15	2	División de Honor B	5th	
2015–16	2	División de Honor B		
2016-17	2	División de Honor B		
2017-18	B	División de Honor B		
2018-19	B	División de Honor B		
2019-20	B	División de Honor B		

- 8 seasons in División de Honor B
