= 2011–12 División de Honor B de Rugby =

2011–12 División de Honor B
- Countries: Spain
- Champions: Hernani; Polideportivos & Fitness CRC
- Runners-up: Pegamo Bera Bera; Complutense Cisneros
- Relegated: -
- Matches played: 118
- Tries scored: 677 (average 5.7 per match)
- Top point scorer: Ramuntxo Mittoux, 156
- Top try scorer: Nicholas Marshall, 14

The 2011–12 División de Honor B began on October 2, 2011 and finished on February 19, 2012 with the Final.

== Competition format ==
The regular season runs through 14 matchdays. Upon completion the regular season, the two top teams of each group play a promotion playoff consisting of semifinal and final. The two semifinal winners are directly promoted. The two semifinalists defeated play a final tie with the winner being earning the last spot in División de Honor. Teams in 7th & 8th position play the relegation playoff to Primera Nacional.

- Each win means 4 points to winning team.
- A draw means 2 points for each team.
- 1 bonus point for a team that achieves 4 tries in a match.
- A defeat by 7 or less points means 1 bonus point for defeated team.

== 2011–12 season teams ==
=== Group A ===
- Teams from northern part of Spain

Team	Stadium	City/Area	Website	2011–12
Hernani	Landare Toki	Hernani	http://www.hernanirugby.com/	1st
Pegamo Bera Bera	Miniestadio de Anoeta	San Sebastián	http://www.berabera.com/	2nd
Oviedo TRADEHI	El Naranco	Oviedo	https://web.archive.org/web/20110423104112/http://www.oviedorugby.com/	3rd
Bathco Independiente	Mies de Cozada	Santander	http://www.independienterugbyclub.eu/	4th
Hercesa	Antonio Machado	Alcalá de Henares	http://cdhercesa.com/	5th
FC Barcelona	La Teixonera	Barcelona	http://www.fcbrugby.com/	6th
L'Hospitalet	Feixa Llarga	L'Hospitalet de Llobregat	http://www.rugbyhospitalet.com/	7th
Durango Ilarduya	Arripausueta	Durango	https://web.archive.org/web/20150328070752/http://www.durangorugby.com/	8th

==== Final standings ====
	Team	Pld	W	D	L	PF	PA	Dif	TF	TA	Bonus	Pts
1	Hernani	14	14	0	0	449	138	311	65	14	13	69
2	Pegamo Bera Bera	14	11	0	3	417	245	172	58	33	10	54
3	Oviedo TRADEHI	14	7	0	7	379	313	66	50	39	8	36
4	Bathco Independiente	14	6	0	8	274	412	−138	32	53	4	28
5	Hercesa	14	5	0	9	335	393	−58	42	50	8	28
6	FC Barcelona	14	5	0	9	225	321	−96	32	47	7	27
7	L'Hospitalet	14	5	0	9	217	305	−88	26	38	5	25
8	Durango Ilarduya	14	3	0	11	219	388	−169	24	55	4	16

Source: Federación Española de Rugby

Qualified for Promotion playoffs

=== Group B ===
- Teams from southern part of Spain

Team	Stadium	City/Area	Website	2011–12
Polideportivos & Fitness CRC	Valle de las Cañas	Pozuelo de Alarcón	https://crcpozuelorugby.com/	1st
Complutense Cisneros	Estadio Nacional Complutense	Madrid	https://www.rugbycisneros.com/es	2nd
Liceo Francés	Ramón Urtubi	Madrid	http://www.liceo.com/	3rd
Les Abelles	Quatre Carreres	Valencia	http://www.lesabelles.net/	4th
Rugby Valencia	Campo del Río Turia	Valencia	http://www.caurugbyvalencia.com/	5th
Atlético Portuense	Polideportivo Municipal	El Puerto de Santa María	http://www.craportuense.com/	6th
Arquitectura	Estadio Nacional Complutense	Madrid	http://www.arquitectura-rugby.org/	7th
Helvetia	Instalaciones Deportivas "La Cartuja"	Seville	http://www.clubamigosrugby.com/	8th

==== Final standings ====
	Team	Pld	W	D	L	PF	PA	Dif	TF	TA	Bonus	Pts
1	Polideportivos & Fitness CRC	14	13	0	1	524	121	403	82	15	11	63
2	Complutense Cisneros	14	11	0	3	506	181	325	72	24	11	55
3	Liceo Francés	14	7	1	6	387	278	109	52	40	10	40
4	Les Abelles	14	8	0	6	257	290	−33	35	43	5	37
5	Rugby Valencia	14	7	0	7	264	340	−76	30	46	5	33
6	Atlético Portuense	14	6	0	8	238	351	−113	27	47	5	29
7	Arquitectura	14	2	1	11	205	401	−196	27	56	5	15
8	Helvetia	14	1	0	13	148	567	−419	23	77	3	7

Source: Federación Española de Rugby

Qualified for Promotion playoffs

=== Promotion playoffs ===
Semifinals
Polideportivos & Fitness CRC	27	15	42
Pegamo Bera Bera	23	16	39
Hernani	16	13	29
Complutense Cisneros	23	7	30

Repechage tie
Pegamo Bera Bera	20	18	38
Hernani	35	18	53

- Polideportivos & Fitness CRC and Complutense Cisneros; promoted to División de Honor.
- Hernani play the relegation/promotion playoff versus Sanitas Alcobendas.

== Scorers statistics ==
=== By try points ===
Player	Try points	Team
(New Zealand) Nicholas Marshall	70	Pégamo Bera Bera
(New Zealand) Tom Davie	60	Liceo Francés
(Spain) Javier Canosa	55	Polideportivos & Fitness CRC
(Argentina) Martín Roveda	55	Oviedo TRADEHI
(Spain) Jordi Sánchez	50	Oviedo TRADEHI
(Spain) Iraitz Garmendia	45	Hernani
(Spain) Juan Cano	45	Complutense Cisneros
(Spain) José de la Cueva	45	Atlético Portuense
(Argentina) Martín Heredia	45	Polideportivos & Fitness CRC
(Spain) Rafael Matt	45	Complutense Cisneros

=== By total points ===
Player	Points	Team
(France) Ramuntxo Mittoux	156	Pégamo Bera Bera
(Spain) Carlos Casanova	144	CAU Valencia
(Argentina) Julián Maccaferri	141	Bathco Independiente
(Spain) José de la Cueva	118	Atlético Portuense
(Spain) Iraitz Garmendia	111	Hernani
(Argentina) Nacho Heredia	106	Polideportivos & Fitness CRC
(Spain) Manuel Olivares	101	Complutense Cisneros
(Spain) Guillermo Mateu	92	Hercesa
(Spain) Víctor Cuenca	87	L'Hospitalet
(New Zealand) Kurt Schrader	85	Liceo Francés

== See also ==
- División de Honor B de Rugby
- División de Honor de Rugby
- Rugby union in Spain
