= CR Atlético Portuense =

Spanish rugby union club, based in El Puerto de Santa Maria

(Spain) Atlético Portuense
- Full name: Club de Rugby Atlético Portuense
- Founded: 1971; 55 years ago
- Location: El Puerto de Santa Maria, Spain
- Ground: Polideportivo "La Puntilla"
- Chairman: José Antonio González
- Coach: Guzmán Álvarez
- League: 1ª División Regional Andaluza
- 2023–24: 1ª División Regional, 2nd
1st kit	2nd kit

Official website
- www.craportuense.com/es

Club de Rugby Atlético Portuense is a Spanish rugby union club.

The club began as the rugby section of the Club Atlético Portuense in 1971, joining the junior and senior leagues in 1972. In 1982 the rugby section became an independent club and has been known as Club de Rugby Atlético Portuense since. Currently the 1st team competes in the 1ª División Regional competition, the third-highest level of Spanish club rugby.

The club is based in the town of El Puerto de Santa Maria in Andalucia, Spain. CR Atlético Portuense play in yellow and green colours.

Home games are played at the municipal sports centre "Polideportivo La Puntilla" and the club also has its own private clubhouse called La Bodeguita del Club de Rugby, which is inside a restored sherry bodega and situated at Calle La Palma, 23.

== Season by season ==
Season	Tier	Division	Pos.	Notes
1978–79	2	Primera Nacional	1st	Promoted
1979–80	1	División de Honor	7th	
1980–81	1	División de Honor	5th	
1981–82	1	División de Honor	4th	Relegated
1982–83	3	Segunda Nacional	3rd	
1983–84	3	Segunda Nacional	3rd	
1984–87	3	Segunda Nacional	—	
1987–88	2	Primera Nacional	5th	
1988–89	2	Primera Nacional	5th	
1989–90	2	Primera Nacional	5th	
1990–91	2	Primera Nacional	7th	Relegated
1991–94	3	Segunda Nacional	—	
1994–95	2	Primera Nacional	5th	
1995–96	2	Primera Nacional	8th	
1996–97	2	Primera Nacional	10th	Relegated
1997–99	4	Segunda Nacional	—	
1999–00	3	Primera Nacional	6th	
2000–01	3	Primera Nacional	3rd	
2001–02	3	Primera Nacional	4th	
2002–03	3	Primera Nacional	2nd	
2003–04	3	Primera Nacional	2nd	Promoted
2004–05	2	División de Honor B	6th	
2005–06	2	División de Honor B	3rd	

Season	Tier	Division	Pos.	Notes
2006–07	2	División de Honor B	5th	
2007–08	2	División de Honor B	3rd	
2008–09	2	División de Honor B	1st	
2009–10	2	División de Honor B	5th	
2010–11	2	División de Honor B	5th	
2011–12	2	División de Honor B	6th	
2012–13	2	División de Honor B	5th	
2013–14	2	División de Honor B	2nd / 3rd	Relegated
2014-15	3	1ª División Regional	1st / P	Promoted
2015–16	2	División de Honor B		
2016-17				
2017-18				
2018-19				
2019-20				
2020-21				
2021-22				
2022-23				
2023-24	3	1º Regional Division	2nd	
2024-25	3	1º Regional Division	-	

- 3 seasons in División de Honor
- 10 seasons in División de Honor B

== See also ==
- Rugby union in Spain
