= Durango RT =

Spanish rugby union club, based in Durango

Durango Nissan-Gaursa
- Full name: Durango Rugby Taldea
- Founded: 1986; 40 years ago
- Location: Durango, Spain
- Ground: Arripausueta
- President: Juan Manuel Iriondo
- Coach: Inés Etxegibel
- League: División de Honor B – Group A
- 2014–15: División de Honor B – Group A, 2nd
Team kit

Durango Rugby Taldea is a Spanish rugby union team based in Durango.

== History ==
The club was founded in 1986.

== Season to season ==
Season	Tier	Division	Pos.	Notes
1998–99	3	Primera Nacional	3rd	
1999–00	3	Primera Nacional	4th	
2000–01	3	Primera Nacional	3rd	
2001–02	3	Primera Nacional	3rd	
2002–03	3	Primera Nacional	4th	
2003–04	3	Primera Nacional	1st	Promoted
2004–05	2	División de Honor B	7th	
2005–06	2	División de Honor B	6th	
2006–07	2	División de Honor B	6th	

Season	Tier	Division	Pos.	Notes
2007–08	2	División de Honor B	7th	
2008–09	2	División de Honor B	7th	
2009–10	2	División de Honor B	10th	
2010–11	2	División de Honor B	6th	
2011–12	2	División de Honor B	8th	
2012–13	2	División de Honor B	10th	
2013–14	2	División de Honor B	7th	
2014–15	2	División de Honor B	2nd	
2015–16	2	División de Honor B		

- 11 seasons in División de Honor B
