= Estadio de la Cerámica =

Football stadium in Vila-real, Spain

Coordinates: 39°56′39″N 0°06′13″W

- Feudo Amarillo; La Cerámica
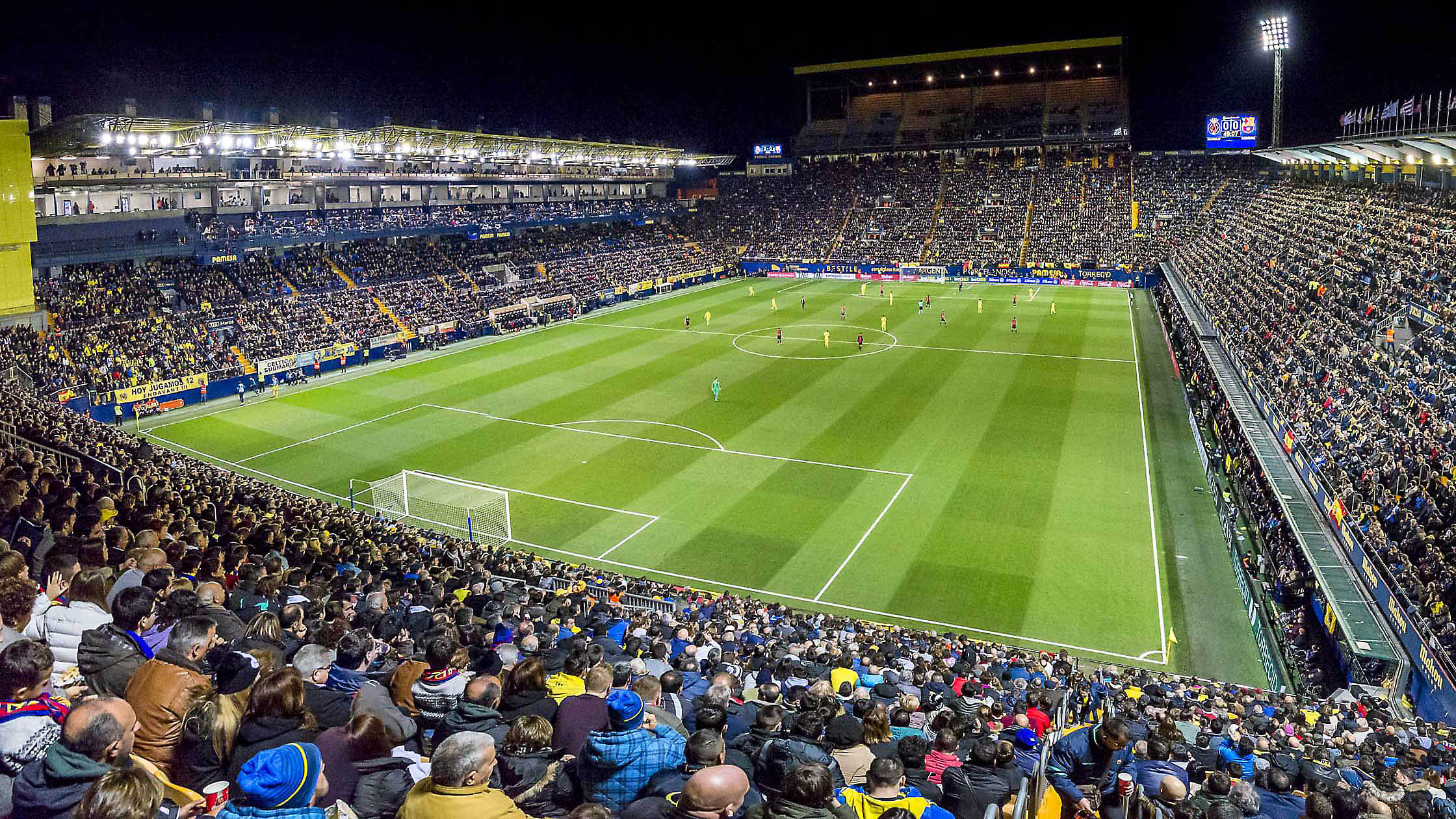
- Interactive map of Estadio de la Cerámica
- Former names: Campo del Villarreal (1923–25); El Madrigal (1925–2017)
- Location: Villarreal, Spain
- Owner: Villarreal CF
- Capacity: 24,000
- Surface: hybrid grass
- Field size: 105 x 68 m

Construction
- Built: 1923
- Opened: 17 June 1923
- Renovated: 1952 (pitch expansion); 2005 (Champions League); 2022 (centenary remodeling)
- Expanded: 1998–2001
- Cost: €35 million (2022 remodeling)
- Architect: IDOM (2022)

Tenants
- Villarreal CF (1923–present); Spain national football team (selected matches); Villarreal B (2023–present)

Estadio de la Cerámica, formerly and informally called El Madrigal (Spanish pronunciation: [el maðɾiˈɣal]), is a football stadium in Villarreal, Spain, in use since 1923. It is the home venue of Villarreal CF of La Liga, the highest division of Spanish football, and since 2023 has also hosted the reserve side Villarreal B.

The stadium holds 24,000 spectators, a figure roughly equal to half the population of Vila-real, making it the 26th-largest stadium in Spain and the fifth-largest in the Valencian Community.

== Name ==
The stadium opened in 1923 as Campo del Villarreal (Villarreal Field) and was renamed two years later in honour of the rural lands on which it had been built, becoming widely known as El Madrigal. It is also nicknamed the Feudo Amarillo ("Yellow Fief") and La Cerámica. On 8 January 2017, shortly before a La Liga match against Barcelona, the club renamed the ground Estadio de la Cerámica (English: Ceramics Stadium), recognising the local ceramics industry.

== History ==
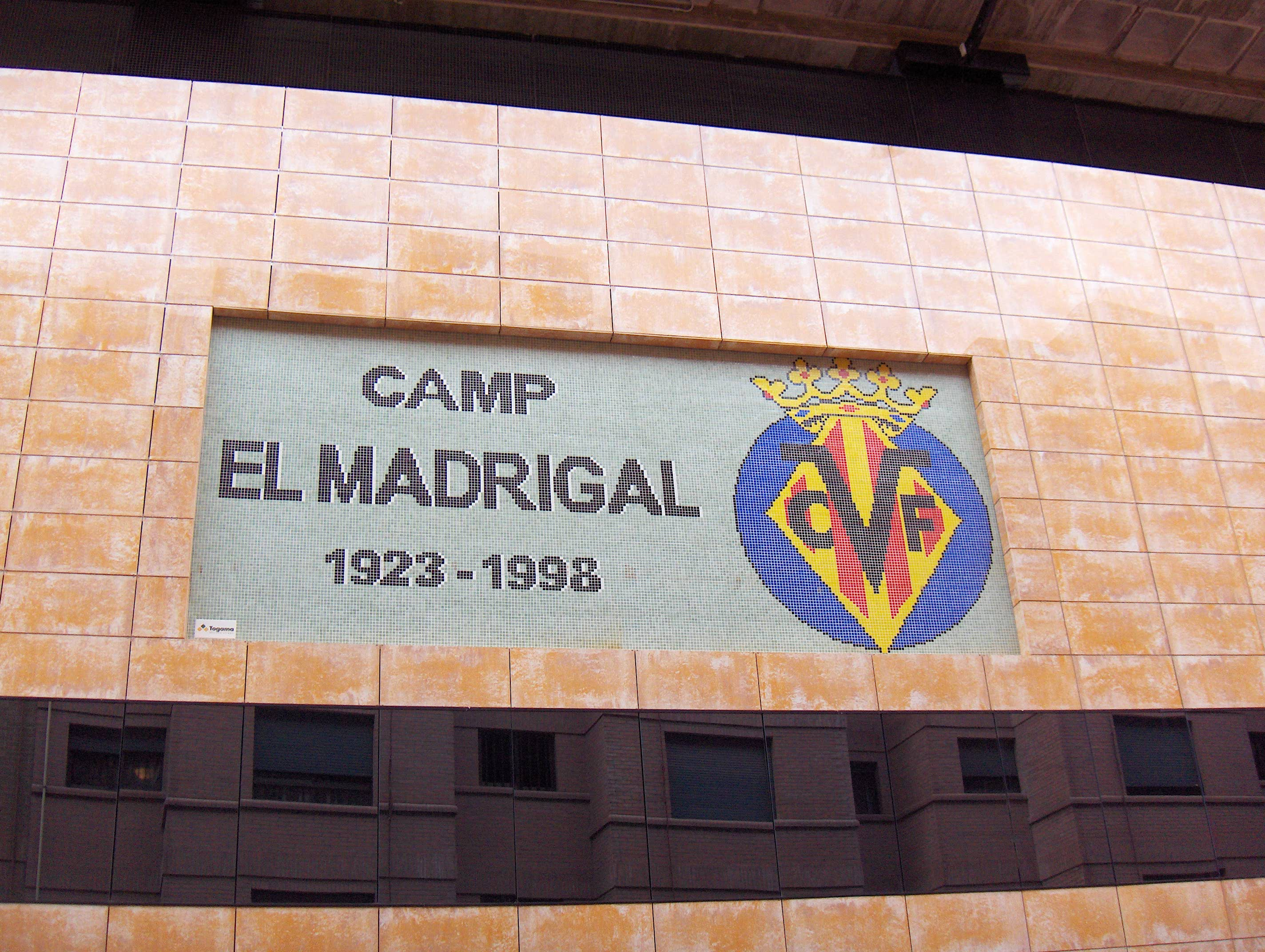
Plaque at the stadium's exterior

=== Origins and early development (1923–1973) ===
The stadium was inaugurated on 17 June 1923 with a match between Castellón and Cervantes. The first remodeling works took place in the close season before the 1952–53 season, when the pitch was enlarged from 95 x 50 m to 104 x 65 m, matching the dimensions of the Helsinki Olympic Stadium used at the 1952 Summer Olympics, a benchmark widely copied at the time. During the 1960s the club erected a small covered stand, and the southern stands were completed during the 1971–72 season. The ground was first floodlit for a night match on 16 September 1973, for a third division fixture against Ibiza; the city hall helped fund four floodlight towers, one at each corner of the field, each topped with nine halogen lamps.

=== Redevelopment for the 75th anniversary (1988–2001) ===
The southern stand was demolished in 1988 to make way for a new structure, which opened on 8 March 1989 with a friendly against Atlético Madrid. For the club's 75th anniversary, further renovation followed: the south stand was demolished once more and rebuilt with a roof, an amphitheatre and a VIP sector, and a new northern stand was added, with the work completed in the 1999–2000 season. The grandstand was enlarged in the summer of 2001. The changing rooms, which had occupied the south-eastern corner of the ground until the 1935–36 season, the north-east until 1989, and then the south-west, were finally moved beneath the main stand following these modifications.

=== Champions League renovation (2005) ===
To meet the requirements for hosting UEFA Champions League matches, the stadium was renovated at short notice in 2005. The façade was tiled in yellow, the dressing rooms and media facilities were upgraded, the separation between the pitch and spectators was widened, and two restaurants were built within the ground.

=== 2022 centenary remodeling ===
To mark its centenary, Villarreal CF undertook the most extensive renovation in the stadium's history in 2022. The roughly €35 million project was designed by the engineering and architecture firm IDOM and built by Alviben, a construction company from Vila-real. Work began on 16 May 2022, immediately after the final home match of the 2021–22 season; while it was under way the team played its home fixtures at Levante's Estadio Ciutat de València, and the rebuilt ground reopened on 31 December 2022 for a derby against Valencia. Buildings attached to the south-eastern corner were demolished and the previously separate stand roofs were replaced with a single continuous canopy, closing the ground into a fully enclosed bowl; the works consumed about 2,400 tonnes of steel and 4,400 m of micropiles. Houses behind the Fondo Norte were acquired so that the new roof could be extended over that stand and linked to the rest of the structure.

== Structure and facilities ==
The stadium stands at Plaza Labrador, about ten kilometres from the Mediterranean Sea and 50 metres above sea level. The pitch measures 105 by 68 metres on a hybrid-grass surface, and the ground holds 24,000 spectators. Since the 2022 remodeling it has formed a fully enclosed bowl, with a single continuous roof covering every seat and a yellow ceramic façade and new lighting giving the exterior a unified appearance. Photovoltaic solar panels were installed on the roof with the aim of making the stadium energy self-sufficient. The same project replaced and more widely spaced every seat, refurbished one of the stadium's two restaurants, added a club museum, and created a multipurpose room overlooking the pitch at the crown of the Fondo Sur.

=== Casals Grocs ===
The stadium contains 30 Casals Grocs VIP boxes, each with air conditioning, a television showing a live feed of the match, a catering service, individual seats and independent access from the southern stand via three elevators. Of the 30 boxes, five accommodate 20 people, 23 accommodate 16, and the remaining two hold 12.

== Other uses ==
Besides Villarreal CF, the ground has hosted selected matches of the Spain national football team and, since 2023, has been the home of the reserve team Villarreal B. In February 2021, Norwegian club Molde FK played a Europa League last-32 home match at the stadium because of COVID-19 travel restrictions in Norway.

== See also ==
- List of football stadiums in Spain
- Lists of stadiums
