= Estadio Nueva Condomina =

Football stadium in Murcia, Spain

Estadio Enrique Roca
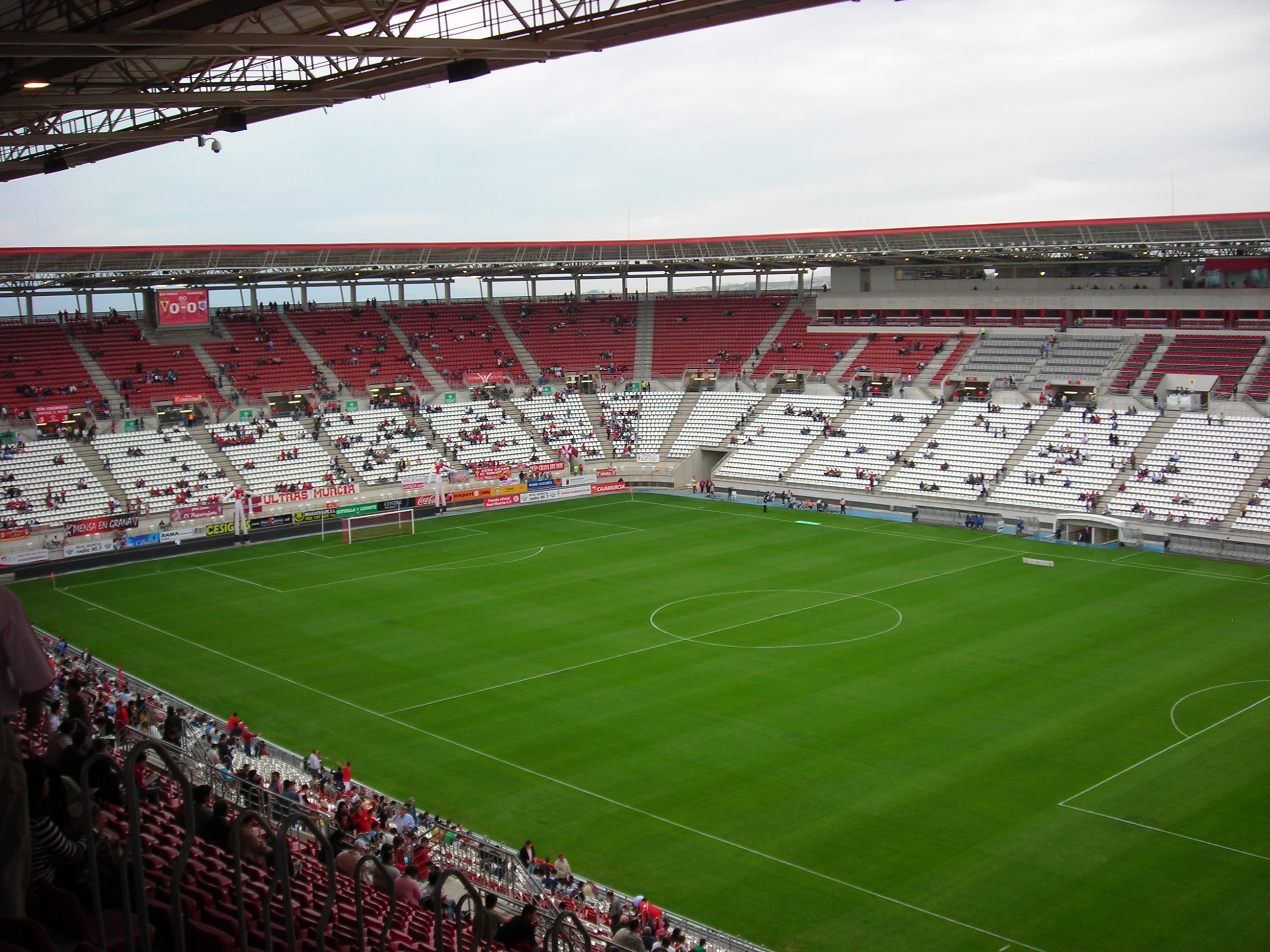
- Interactive map of Estadio Enrique Roca
- Full name: Estadio Enrique Roca de Murcia
- Former names: Estadio Nueva Condomina (2006–present)
- Location: Murcia, Spain
- Coordinates: 38°02′32″N 1°08′41″W
- Owner: Ayuntamiento de Murcia
- Operator: Ayuntamiento de Murcia
- Capacity: 32,024
- Field size: 102 m × 70 m (335 ft × 230 ft)

Construction
- Opened: October 11, 2006
- Architect: Jaime López Amor

Tenants
- Real Murcia (2006–present); Spain national football team (selected matches)

Estadio Nueva Condomina, currently known as Estadio Enrique Roca de Murcia for sponsorship reasons, is a multi-use stadium in Murcia, Spain. Completed in 2006, it is used mostly for football matches and hosts the home matches of Real Murcia. The stadium has a capacity of 32,024 seats, making it the 16th-largest stadium in Spain and the largest in the Region of Murcia. The Nueva Condomina replaced La Condomina stadium as the home venue of Real Murcia.

The stadium was officially opened on October 11, 2006, with a friendly match between Spain and Argentina. Real Murcia played its first game at this stadium on 26 November 2006, against Real Valladolid.

The stadium was renamed Estadio Enrique Roca de Murcia in December 2019 after an agreement with the namesake company. Murcia is one of the potential host cities for the 2030 FIFA World Cup.

== See also ==
- List of stadiums in Spain
- Lists of stadiums
