= Bera Bera RT =

Spanish rugby union club, based in Donostia-San Sebastian

(Spain) AVK Bera Bera
- Full name: Bera Bera Rugby Taldea
- Founded: 1983; 43 years ago
- Location: San Sebastián, Spain
- Ground: Miniestadio de Anoeta (Capacity: 1,500)
- Chairman: Fernando Diez Mintegi
- Coach: Gorka Bueno
- League: División de Honor B – Group A
- 2014–15: División de Honor B – Group A, 3rd
Team kit

Official website
- pegamo.berabera.com

Active departments of Bera Bera
Rugby	Handball	Basketball
Karate	Bicycle touring	Surfing
Volleyball	Wheelchair basketball	Roller skating

Bera Bera Rugby Taldea is a Spanish rugby union club. The club was established in 1983 and currently competes in the División de Honor B de Rugby competition, the second-level of Spanish club rugby. The club are based in San Sebastián. Bera Bera play in blue and orange.

== History ==
Bera Bera R.T. was established in 1986 as a split from the rugby union section of Club Atlético San Sebastián. Its name, Bera Bera came from the avenue of the Aiete neighborhood of San Sebastián, where the rugby field of Atlético San Sebastian was located, which in turn, came from a caserío in the zone. Originally, Bera Bera was solely a rugby union club, which remained as such almost during a decade.

== Rugby union section ==
The rugby union section was the one which gave origin to the club and plays in the Spanish rugby union top category, División de Honor. Among its achievements, the club won its only Copa del Rey title, won in 2004. In the 2008-09 season, it reached the 7th place in the División de Honor, near to relegation until the following season. Bera Bera usually plays its home games at MIniestadio de Anoeta, in San Sebastián. Its participation in the Super Ibérica de Rugby frames this club as the lead club of the Basque franchise, the Basque Korsarioak, which incorporate players from most Basque clubs.

== Trophies ==
- Copa del Rey: 1
  - Champions: 2003–04
- Supercopa de España: 0
  - Runners-up: 2004

== Season by season ==
Season	Tier	Division	Pos.	Notes
1990–91	2	Primera Nacional	2nd	
1991–92	2	Primera Nacional	1st	Promoted
1992–93	1	División de Honor	8th	
1993–94	1	División de Honor	9th	
1994–95	1	División de Honor	11th	Relegated
1995–96	2	Primera Nacional	1st	Promoted
1996–97	1	División de Honor	10th	Relegated
1997–98	2	Primera Nacional	3rd	Promoted
1998–99	2	División de Honor B	7th	
1999–00	2	División de Honor B	10th	Relegated
2000–01	3	Primera Nacional	1st	Promoted
2001–02	2	División de Honor B	4th	
2002–03	2	División de Honor B	2nd	Promoted

Season	Tier	Division	Pos.	Notes
2003–04	1	División de Honor	5th	Cup champion
2004–05	1	División de Honor	3rd	
2005–06	1	División de Honor	4th	
2006–07	1	División de Honor	5th	
2007–08	1	División de Honor	7th	
2008–09	1	División de Honor	6th	
2009–10	1	División de Honor	9th	
2010–11	1	División de Honor	9th	Relegated
2011–12	2	División de Honor B	2nd	
2012–13	2	División de Honor B	7th	
2013–14	2	División de Honor B	1st / 2nd	
2014–15	2	División de Honor B	3rd	
2015–16	2	División de Honor B		

- 12 seasons in División de Honor

== International honours ==
- (Spain) Pedro J Dávila
- (Spain) Iker Lopategi
- (Spain) David Hernández
- (Spain) Oscar Astarloa
- (Spain) Igor Mirones
- (Spain) Gorka Bueno
- (Spain) Pablo Feijoo

=== Other notable players ===
- (Spain) Javier Arbelaiz plays the Challenge Cup with Olympus Madrid
- (New Zealand) James Foster signs from Tasman (NPC)
- Daniel Larrechea sings from Aviron Bayonnais (Top14), former player from Sale Sharks, international France A.
- (New Zealand) Tama Makamaka international All-Blacks U20
- (France) Bruno Hiriart signs from US Dax (Top14)

== Ground ==
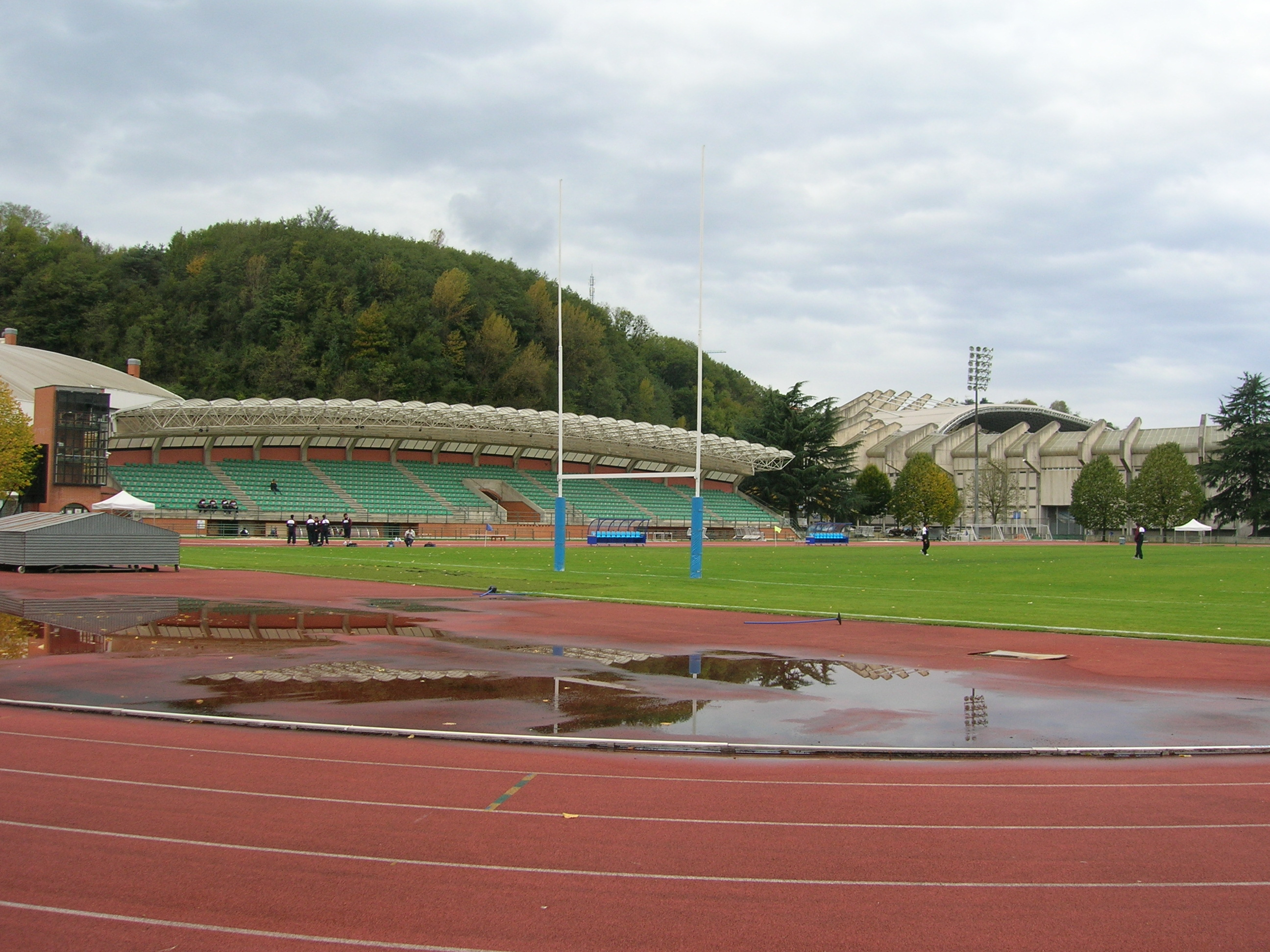
Miniestadio de Anoeta
