= Eibar RT =

Spanish rugby union club, based in Eibar

Eibar Hierros Anetxe
- Full name: Eibar Rugby Taldea
- Founded: 1977; 49 years ago
- Location: Eibar, Spain
- Ground: Complejo Deportivo Unbe/Unbe Kirolgunea
- President: Ion Egiguren
- Coach: Peio Urkidi
- League: División de Honor B – Group A
- 2014–15: División de Honor B – Group A, 10th
Team kit

Eibar Rugby Taldea (known as Avia Eibar RT for sponsorship reasons) is a Spanish rugby union team based in Eibar.

== History ==
The club was founded in 1977.

== Season to season ==
Season	Tier	Division	Pos.	Notes
1997–98	3	Primera Nacional	5th	
1998–99	3	Primera Nacional	8th	Relegated
1999–06	4	Segunda Nacional		
2006–07	3	Primera Nacional	1st	
2007–08	3	Primera Nacional	2nd	
2008–09	3	Primera Nacional	1st	Promoted
2009–10	2	División de Honor B	8th	Relegated
2010–11	3	Primera Nacional	2nd	
2011–12	3	Primera Nacional	1st	Promoted
2012–13	2	División de Honor B	5th	
2013–14	2	División de Honor B	3rd	
2014–15	2	División de Honor B	10th	
2015–16	2	División de Honor B		

- 4 seasons in División de Honor B
