= RC Valencia =

Spanish rugby union club, based in Valencia

Valencia Rugby
- Full name: Rugby Club Valencia
- Founded: 1966; 60 years ago
- Location: Valencia, Spain
- Ground: Quatre Carreres (Capacity: 2,500)
- Chairman: Eduardo González
- Coach: Pablo Lammertyn
- League: División de Honor B
- 2023–24: División de Honor B – Group B, 2nd
1st kit	2nd kit

Official website
- www.valenciarugby.com

Rugby Club Valencia (also known as Valencia Rugby) is a Spanish rugby union team. The club competes in Group East of División de Honor B.

== History ==
The club was established in May 1966 by a group of young players who wanted to see a team from the city of Valencia playing in the national leagues. There were problems securing a field, and the club played on a football field in Picanya and sometimes on the river banks by the teachers' training college in the early years. They acquired their own ground, the Campo de La Pechina (Field of The Pendant), the very first rugby ground in the city.

The following season a youth team was started, which won the regional championship.

The senior team reached the national leagues in 1973/1974 for the first time, and was promoted to the División de Honor in the 1976/1977 season, winning the title in 1982/1983. From 1987 onwards, the search for sponsors for the team began. From 1989, sponsorship by Tecnidex, the company co-founded by the former player Manuel García Portillo, led to the team being known as Valencia Tecnidex.

In 1990 the club gained their primary sponsor, Tecnidex, a company providing chemicals and disinfectants for agricultural purposes.

== Honours ==
- División de Honor: 1
  - 1983
- División de Honor B: 3
  - 1976, 1993, 2002
- Valencian Regional Championship: 5
  - 1968, 1970, 1972, 1974, 2012

== Season by season ==
Season	Tier	Division	Pos.	Notes
1974–75	2	Primera Nacional	2nd	
1975–76	2	Primera Nacional	1st	
1976–77	2	Primera Nacional	2nd	Relegated
1977–78	1	División de Honor	6th	
1978–79	1	División de Honor	3rd	
1979–80	1	División de Honor	3rd	
1980–81	1	División de Honor	3rd	
1981–82	1	División de Honor	4th	
1982–83	1	División de Honor	1st	
1983–84	1	División de Honor	6th	
1984–85	1	División de Honor	6th	
1985–86	1	División de Honor	8th	
1986–87	1	División de Honor	3rd	
1987–88	1	División de Honor	5th	
1988–89	1	División de Honor	9th	
1989–90	1	División de Honor	6th	
1990–91	1	División de Honor	8th	
1991–92	1	División de Honor	11th	Relegated
1992–93	2	Primera Nacional	1st	Promoted
1993–94	1	División de Honor	11th	Relegated
1994–95	2	Primera Nacional	2nd	Promoted
1995–96	1	División de Honor	8th	
1996–97	1	División de Honor	9th	
1997–98	1	División de Honor	9th	
1998–99	1	División de Honor	12th	Relegated
1999–00	2	División de Honor B	4th	
2000–01	2	División de Honor B	8th	
2001–02	2	División de Honor B	1st	Promoted
2002–03	1	División de Honor	7th	
2003–04	1	División de Honor	10th	Relegated

Season	Tier	Division	Pos.	Notes
2004–05	2	División de Honor B	3rd	
2005–06	2	División de Honor B	6th	
2006–07	2	División de Honor B	8th	Relegated
2007–08	3	Primera Nacional	8th	Relegated
2008–09	4	Primera Territorial	—	Promoted
2009–10	3	Primera Nacional	8th	
2010–11	3	Primera Nacional	7th	Relegated
2011–12	4	Primera Territorial	1st	Promoted
2012–13	3	Primera Nacional	1st	Promoted
2013–14	2	División de Honor B	6th	
2014–15	2	División de Honor B	5th	
2015–16	2	División de Honor B	—	
2016–17	2	División de Honor B	—	
2017–18	2	División de Honor B	—	
2018–19	2	División de Honor B	—	
2019–20	2	División de Honor B	—	
2020–21	2	División de Honor B	—	
2021–22	2	División de Honor B	—	
2022–23	2	División de Honor B	—	
2023–24	2	División de Honor B	2nd	
2024–25	2	División de Honor B	—	

- 22 seasons in División de Honor
