= La Romareda =

Home stadium of Real Zaragoza, Aragon, Spain

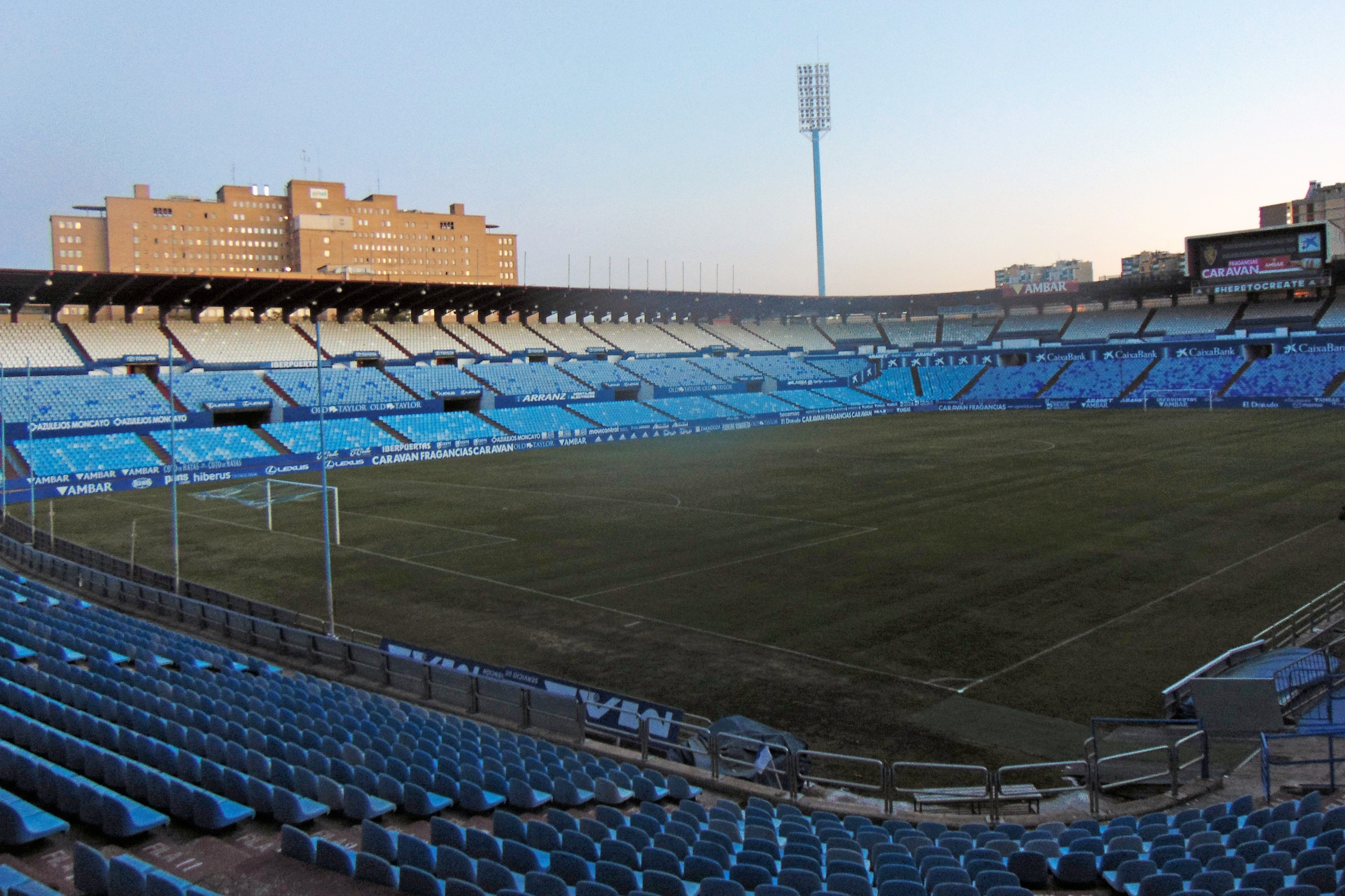
- The old Romareda in 2017
- Interactive map of La Romareda
- Full name: La Romareda
- Location: Zaragoza, Spain
- Coordinates: 41°38′12″N 0°54′7″W
- Owner: Ayuntamiento de Zaragoza
- Operator: Real Zaragoza
- Capacity: 33,608 (expand to 43,110)
- Surface: Grass
- Field size: 107 m × 68 m (351 ft × 223 ft)

Construction
- Groundbreaking: 19 September 1956
- Opened: 8 September 1957
- Renovated: 1977, 1982, 1994, 2025–2027
- Expanded: 2025–2027
- Cost: 21,512,640.50 pesetas
- Architect: Francisco Riestra
- Project manager: José Beltrán
- General contractor: Agromán

Tenants
- Real Zaragoza (1957–2025, 2027–present); Spain national football team (selected matches)

Estadio de La Romareda ([esˈtaðjo ðe la romaˈɾeða]) was a municipally-owned football stadium in Zaragoza, Spain. Operated by Real Zaragoza, it was inaugurated on 8 September 1957 with a match against Osasuna, which ended 4–3. The stadium's official capacity was 33,608, with average attendances of around 20,000 for Real Zaragoza fixtures. It ranked as the 12th-largest stadium in Spain and the largest in Aragon.

Over the years, La Romareda underwent several renovations, notably in 1977 and 1982, when it served as a venue for the 1982 FIFA World Cup. It also hosted group-stage matches and a quarterfinal during the 1992 Summer Olympics. In 1994, the stadium was converted into an all-seater, and that same year it staged the FIRA Trophy match between Spain and Romania.

On 8 July 2024, demolition of the original La Romareda began. Its replacement, Nueva Romareda, will feature 43,110 seats for football matches, with expandable capacity for concerts and large-scale events. The new stadium is scheduled to be fully operational by 31 August 2027, allowing Real Zaragoza to move into their new home for the 2027–28 season.

On 25 May 2025, the last official match was played at La Romareda. Real Zaragoza defeated Deportivo de La Coruña 1–0.

== History ==
The construction of La Romareda was due to the efforts of the mayor Luis Gómez Laguna, and his successor Cesáreo Alierta, who was the president of Real Zaragoza. Their previous ground Estadio Torrero, with a capacity of 15,000, was considered too small.

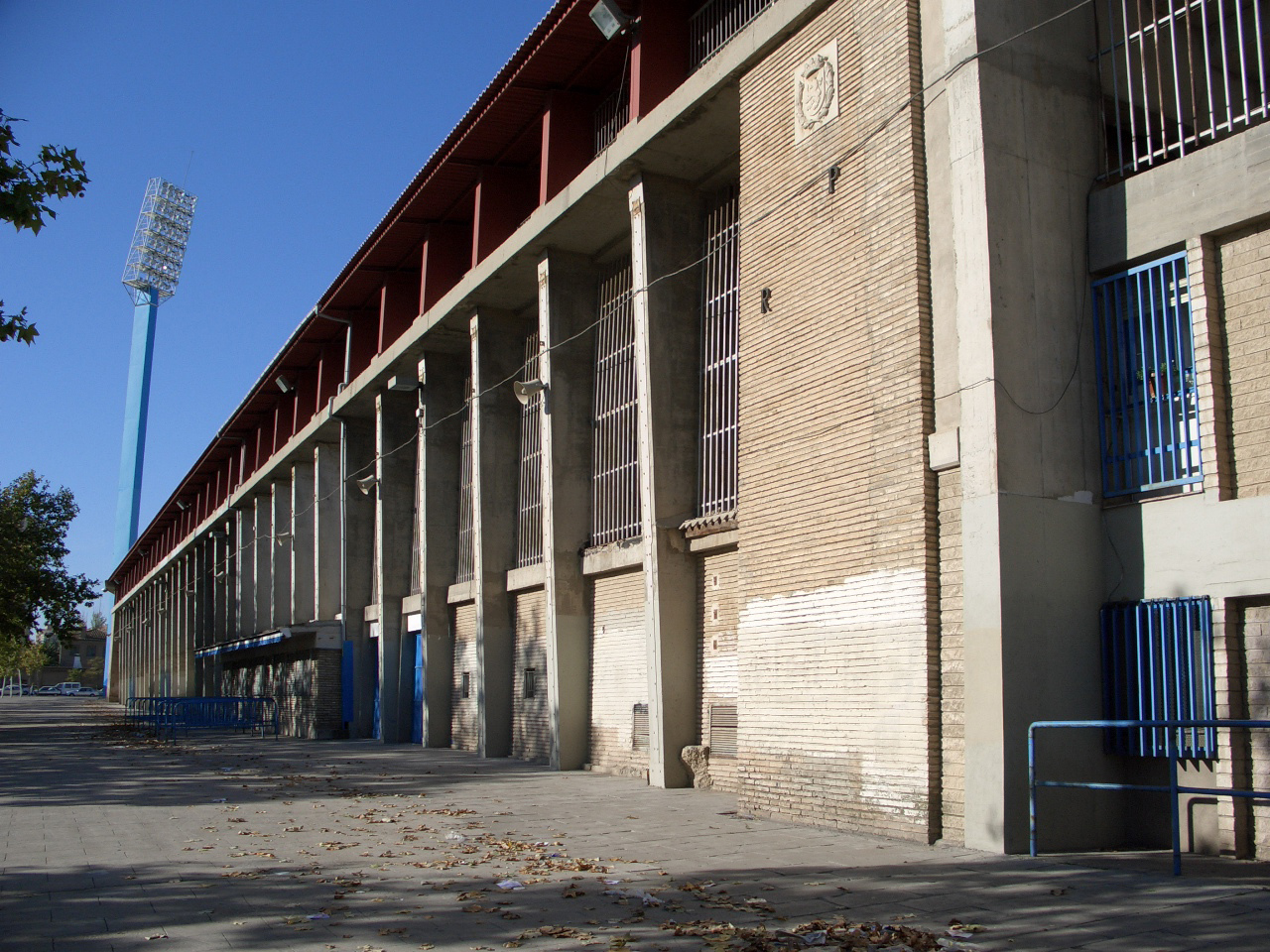
environs at Estadio La Romareda

The matter was brought before the city council, who on 9 February 1956 approved the plans to build the stadium. The task of building the stadium was given to the construction company Agroman, who in the 15 months it took to build the stadium employed 350 employees.

The stadium has been used as a concert venue. Michael Jackson performed at the stadium during his HIStory World Tour on 23 September 1996 in front of 45,000 people. Gloria Estefan performed at the stadium in front of another sold out crowd of 45,000 on her Evolution Tour on 20 October 1996.

== Nets ==
Some have claimed that La Romareda had Europe's deepest goal nets, which stretched back four metres. The nets also had a striking blue and white diagonal stripe design.

== 1982 FIFA World Cup ==
The stadium was one of the venues of the 1982 FIFA World Cup, and held three matches:

Date	Team #1	Res.	Team #2	Round	Attendance
17 June 1982	Yugoslavia	0–0	Northern Ireland	Group 5 (first round)	25,000
21 June 1982	Honduras	1–1	Northern Ireland	Group 5 (first round)	15,000
24 June 1982	Honduras	0–1	Yugoslavia	Group 5 (first round)	25,000

== 2030 FIFA World Cup ==
It could potentially host matches for the 2030 FIFA World Cup which Spain will co-host along with Morocco and Portugal.

== See also ==
- List of stadiums in Spain
- Lists of stadiums
