= CAU Rugby Valencia =

Spanish rugby union club, based in Valencia

(Spain) CAU Valencia
- Full name: CAU Rugby Valencia
- Founded: 1973; 53 years ago
- Location: Valencia, Spain
- Ground: Campo del Río Turia (Capacity: 2,000)
- Chairman: Fouad Osseiran
- Coach: Guillermo Lahoz
- League: División de Honor B
- 2023–24: División de Honor B – Group B, 1st
1st kit	2nd kit

Official website
- caurugbyvalencia.com

CAU Rugby Valencia is a rugby union club based in Valencia, Spain. The club currently competes in the second-tier División de Honor B.

== History ==
CAU Rugby Valencia was founded in 1973 by members of the University of Valencia, led by Luis Sebastián Caballero. After many years of playing at regional, provincial and national levels, the club was promoted to the Primera Nacional division in 1996. Two seasons later it moved up to the second-tier División de Honor B, and finally to the División de Honor in 2001. They were relegated in 2011.

== Season by season ==
Season	Tier	Division	Pos.	Notes
1977–78	2	Primera Nacional	8th	
1978–79	2	Primera Nacional	8th	Relegated
1979–80	3	Segunda Nacional	—	Promoted
1980–81	2	Primera Nacional	4th	
1981–82	2	Primera Nacional	5th	Relegated
1982–83	3	Segunda Nacional	2nd	
1983–97	3	Segunda Nacional	—	
1997–98	2	Primera Nacional	1st	
1998–99	2	División de Honor B	5th	
1999–00	2	División de Honor B	6th	
2000–01	2	División de Honor B	1st	Promoted
2001–02	1	División de Honor	7th	
2002–03	1	División de Honor	9th	

Season	Tier	Division	Pos.	Notes
2003–04	2	División de Honor B	10th	
2004–05	2	División de Honor B	4th	
2005–06	2	División de Honor B	5th	
2006–07	2	División de Honor B	3rd	
2007–08	2	División de Honor B	5th	
2008–09	2	División de Honor B	7th	
2009–10	2	División de Honor B	2nd	Promoted
2010–11	1	División de Honor	10th	Relegated
2011–12	2	División de Honor B	5th	
2012–13	2	División de Honor B	3rd	
2013–14	2	División de Honor B	4th	
2014–15	2	División de Honor B	2nd	
2015–16	2	División de Honor B	—	

- 3 seasons in División de Honor
- 13 seasons in División de Honor B
