= Estadio Municipal Juan Rojas =

Rugby stadium in Almería, Spain

Coordinates: 36.8620°N 2.4453°W

Juan Rojas
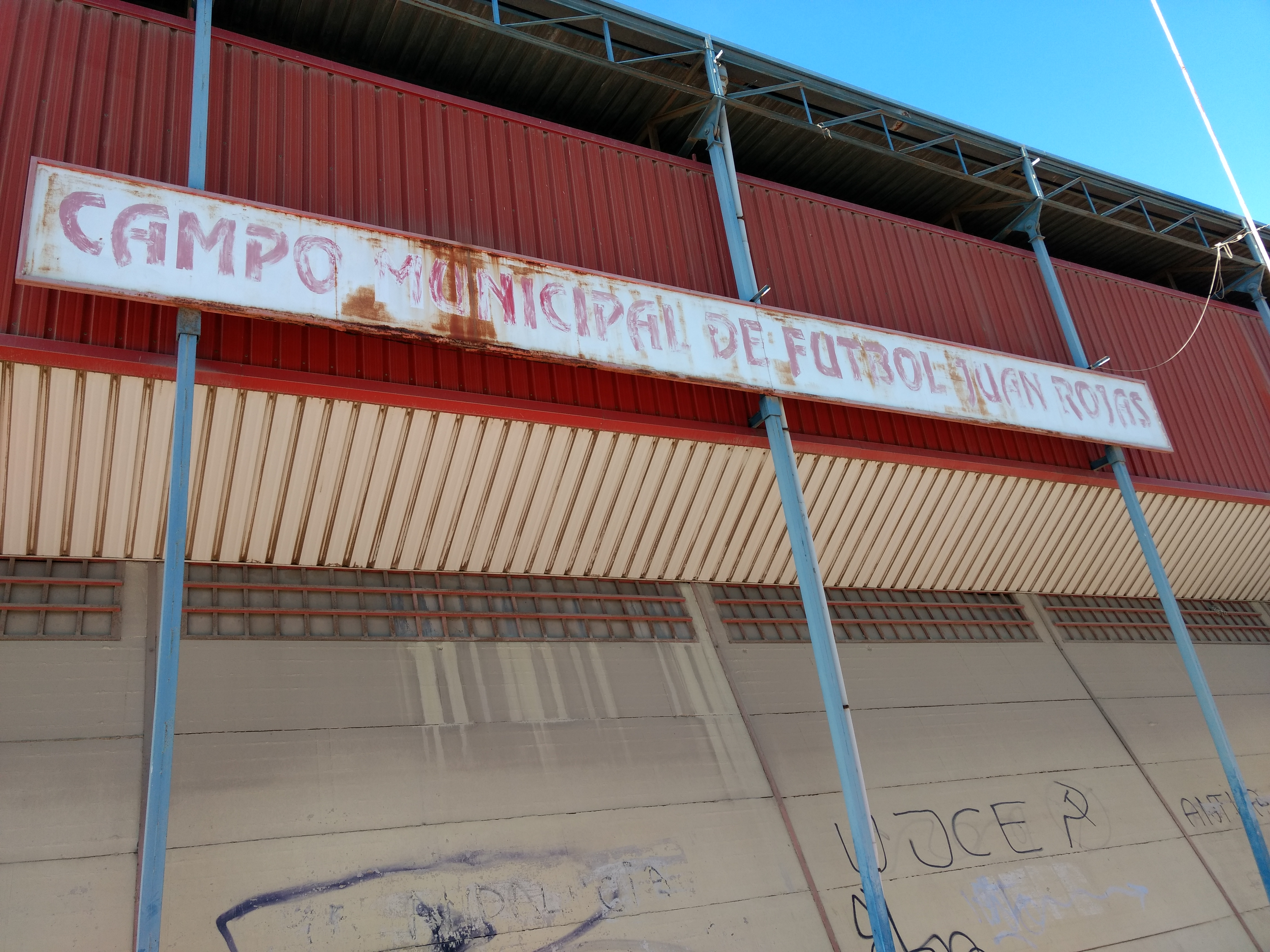

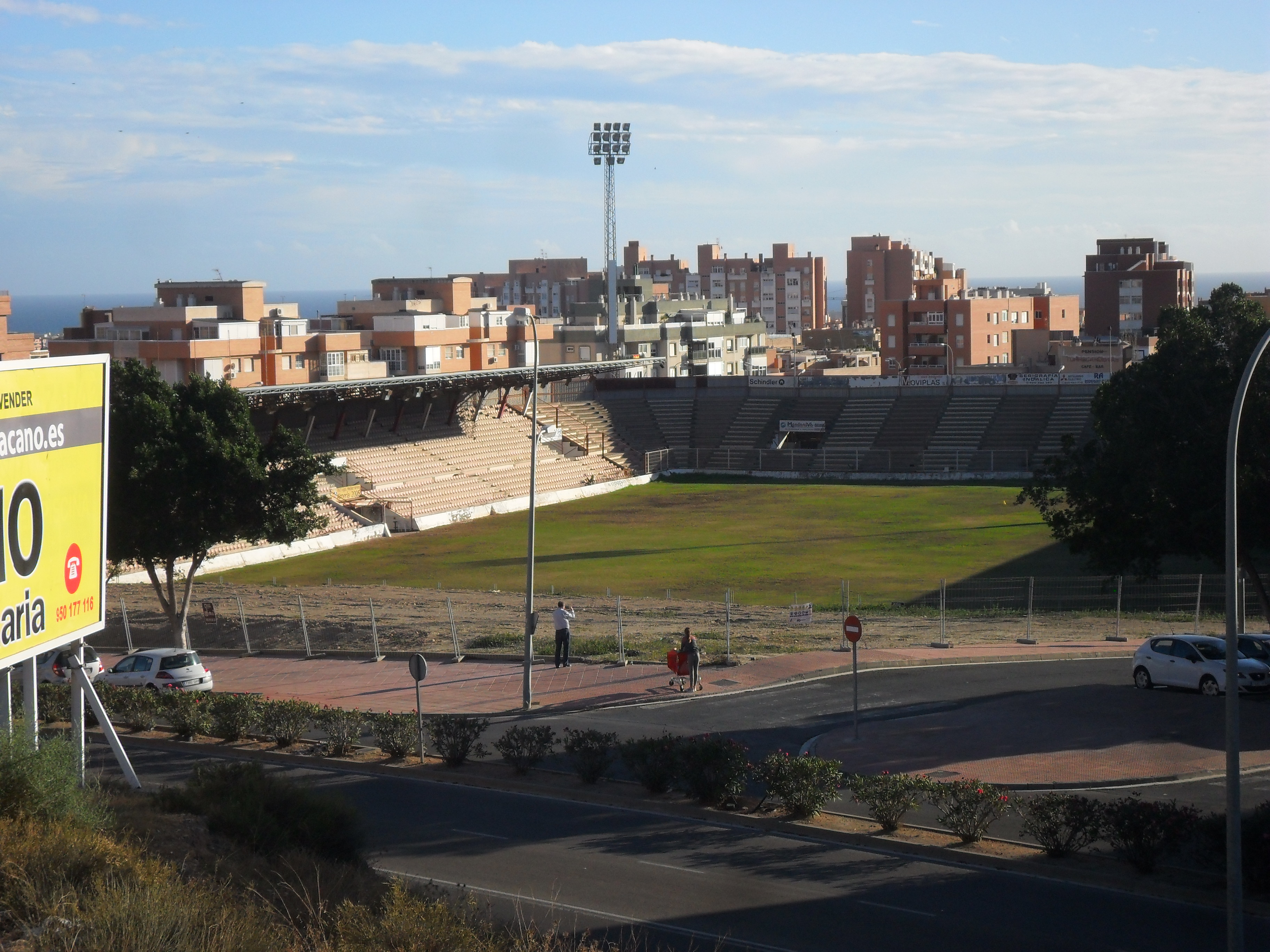
- Interactive map of Juan Rojas
- Full name: Estadio Municipal Juan Rojas
- Location: Almería, Spain
- Owner: Ayuntamiento de Almería
- Operator: Ayuntamiento de Almería
- Capacity: 13,468

Construction
- Opened: 1976
- Renovated: 2017–2018

Tenants
- AD Almería (1976–1982); UD Almería (1989–2004); UD Almería B (2001–2017); UR Almería (2017–)

Estadio Municipal Juan Rojas is a rugby stadium in Almería, Spain. It was initially used as the stadium of football club AD Almería as well as UD Almería matches until it was replaced by Estadio de los Juegos Mediterráneos in 2004. The capacity of the stadium is 13,468 spectators.

In 2017, the stadium was partially demolished to expand the pitch, in order to be able to host the rugby union matches of the local team UR Almería. It was finally re-inaugurated on 8 September 2018.
