= CR Liceo Francés =

Spanish rugby union club, based in Madrid

(Spain) Liceo Francés
- Full name: Club de Rugby Liceo Francés
- Founded: 1968; 58 years ago
- Location: Madrid, Spain
- Ground: Stade Ramon Urtubi (Capacity: 300)
- Chairman: Javier Goitia
- Coach: Fernando Díez
- League: División de Honor B
- 2023–24: División de Honor B – Group Élite, 4th

Official website
- www.liceo.com

Club de Rugby Liceo Francés is a Spanish rugby union club. The club was founded in 1968 and currently competes in the División de Honor de Rugby competition, the top level of Spanish rugby. The club are based in Madrid, Spain and play in red, white and blue.

== History ==
Rugby has been played at the Lycée Français de Madrid since 1968, when the school’s facilities in the Parque del Conde de Orgaz were built. On July 15, 1972, it was formally established as a club independent of the school, although it has always maintained a close connection with the Lycée.

The club began competing at a regional level, before making its debut in the Second Division of the National League in the 1974–75 season.

In 1978, the Ramón Urtubi Stadium, with a natural grass pitch, was built on the school grounds. During the 1980–81 season, Liceo Francés played in the División de Honor de Rugby, after the top tier was expanded.

The club’s first major success came in the 1988–89 season, when it reached the final of the Copa del Rey and won the second-tier Primera Nacional championship, meaning it returned to the División de Honor.

The following years were the club’s golden era, with two league runner-up finishes (1990–91 and 1992–93), another Copa del Rey runner-up (2001), and a FER Cup title (1996).

During the succeeding decades, the club bounced between Spain's top two divisions, hitting a low point when it was relegated to Primera Nacional, now the Spanish third tier, in 2004.

In the 2024–25 season, after 18 years away from the top flight, Liceo Francés achieved promotion under Fernando Díez, defeating Gernika RT 32-29 in the promotion playoff final.

The women's team has won the Copa de la Reina, Spain’s top national competition, twice (1999 and 2000).

Liceo Francés is well-known for its success at youth level. Throughout its history, it has won Spanish national titles in the junior (1993 and 1994), youth (1992 and 1993), cadet (1991 and 2018), children’s (1994), under-12 (1990), under-10 (2002), and under-8 (2005) categories. The youth team also won the Iberian Cup in 1992.

Today, Liceo Francés has around twenty teams competing in different categories, making it one of the Spanish clubs with the most registered players. Many international players have emerged from its ranks, as well as actors Javier Bardem and Sergio Peris-Mencheta.

== Honours ==
- División de Honor: 0
  - Runners-up: 1990–91, 1992–93
- Copa del Rey: 0
  - Runners-up: 1989–90, 2000–01
- Copa FER: 1
  - Champions: 1996
- Primera Nacional: 3
  - Champions: 1976–77, 1985–86, 1988–89

== Season history ==
Season	Tier	Division	Pos.	Notes
1974–75	2	Primera Nacional	5th	
1975–76	2	Primera Nacional	3rd	
1976–77	2	Primera Nacional	1st	
1977–78	2	Primera Nacional	7th	
1978–79	2	Primera Nacional	4th	
1979–80	2	Primera Nacional	4th	Promoted
1980–81	1	División de Honor	7th	Relegated
1981–82	2	Primera Nacional	4th	Relegated
1982–83	3	Segunda Nacional	7th	Promoted
1983–84	2	Primera Nacional	5th	
1984–85	2	Primera Nacional	3rd	
1985–86	2	Primera Nacional	1st	Promoted
1986–87	1	División de Honor	9th	Relegated
1987–88	2	Primera Nacional	3rd	
1988–89	2	Primera Nacional	1st	Promoted
1989–90	1	División de Honor	7th	
1990–91	1	División de Honor	2nd	
1991–92	1	División de Honor	3rd	
1992–93	1	División de Honor	2nd	
1993–94	1	División de Honor	8th	
1994–95	1	División de Honor	9th	Relegated

Season	Tier	Division	Pos.	Notes
1995–96	2	Primera Nacional	2nd	
1996–97	2	Primera Nacional	1st	Promoted
1997–98	1	División de Honor	5th	
1998–99	1	División de Honor	7th	
1999–00	1	División de Honor	4th	
2000–01	1	División de Honor	3rd	Relegated
2001–02	2	División de Honor B	10th	Relegated
2002–03		DNP		
2003–04	3	Primera Nacional	1st	Promoted
2004–05	2	División de Honor B	2nd	Promoted
2005–06	1	División de Honor	8th	
2006–07	1	División de Honor	9th	Relegated
2007–08	2	División de Honor B	1st	
2008–09	2	División de Honor B	5th	
2009–10	2	División de Honor B	3rd	
2010–11	2	División de Honor B	4th	
2011–12	2	División de Honor B	3rd	
2012–13	2	División de Honor B	6th	
2013–14	2	División de Honor B	7th	
2014–15	2	División de Honor B	3rd	
2015–16	2	División de Honor B	—	

- 14 seasons in División de Honor
- 10 seasons in División de Honor B

== See also ==
- Rugby union in Spain
