= UR Almería =

Spanish rugby union club, based in Almería

C. D. Unión Rugby Almería
- Founded: 2013; 13 years ago
- Location: Almería, Spain
- Ground: Estadio Municipal Juan Rojas
- President: Miguel Palanca
- Coach: Francisco Jose Gallegos
- League: 1º Andalusia Regional

Unión Rugby Almería is a Spanish rugby union team based in Almería. They currently play in the 1º Andalusia Region of Spain.

The URA Project currently has 18 teams and 1,000 people practicing rugby union in the province of Almería, which includes children from 4 years of age to the veteran team.

== Teams ==
Their women's team is constantly growing. In addition, its URA Clan project has more than 65 children registered and is based on total inclusion among children of different abilities. It also has an inclusive Senior Rugby team.

Also develops and coordinates 3 Provincial leagues. A U6 to U14, which brings together about 250 children per day. A Provincial League U16 and U18 that is close to 100 children per concentration and another Provincial Senior League, with 4 teams and another almost 100 players.

== Beach Rugby ==
Unión Rugby Almería participates in the Provincial Beach Rugby Circuit, with the organization of the Almería and Almerimar Tournaments and its presence in those of Adra, Vera, Pulpí and Carboneras.

== Union ==
URA integrates the Costa de Almería Rugby Club, founded in 1995, El Ejido Rugby founded in 2003, the C.R. Roquetas de Mar and the more recently created Huércal-Overa Rugby Club, in addition to having the firm intention of continuing to develop and grow the project.
