= Campo de Rugby de Fuentenueva =

Rugby field in Granada, Andalusia, Spain

Fuentenueva
- Stade Fuentenuevais
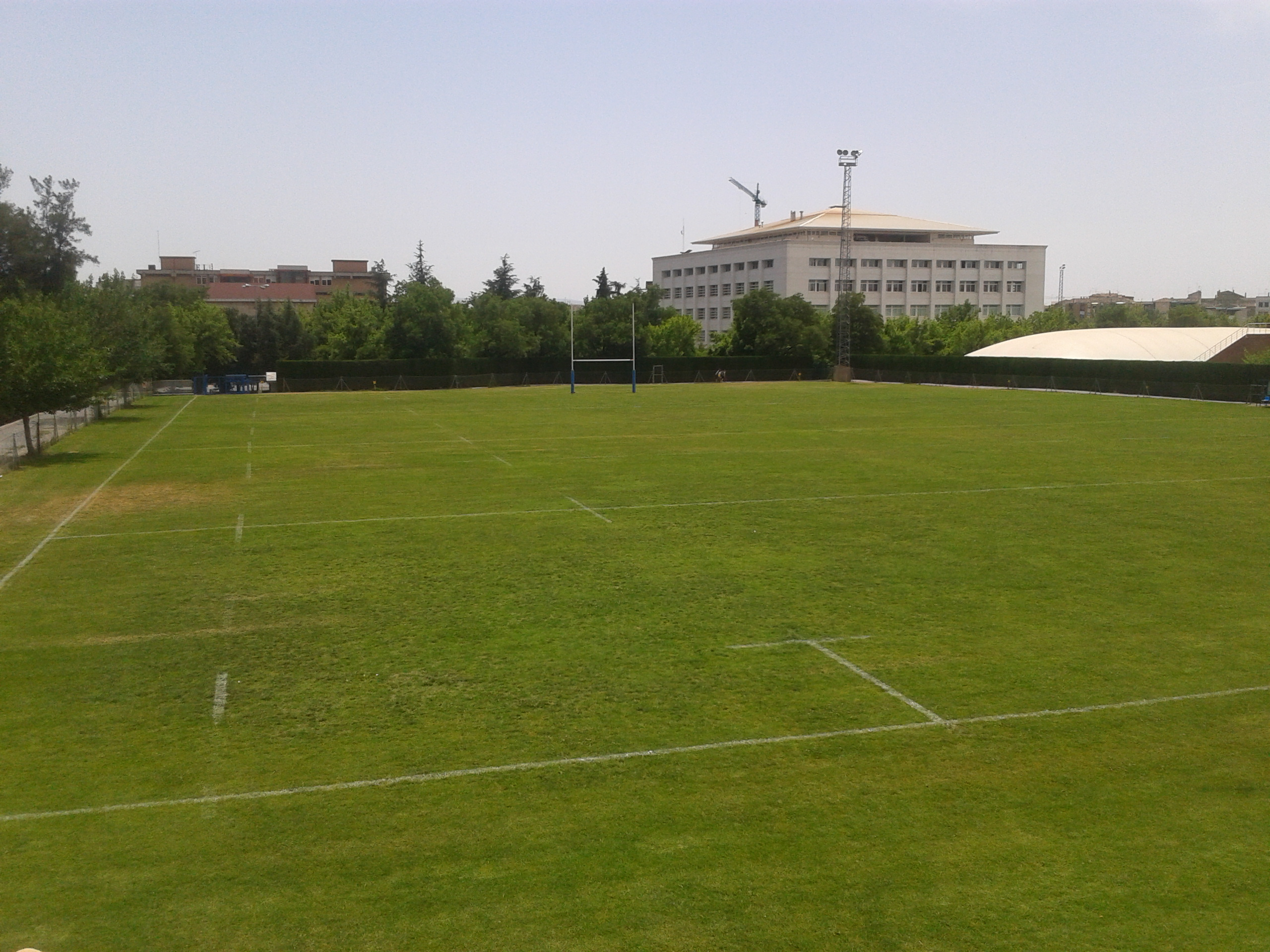
- Field view from the stand
- Interactive map of Fuentenueva
- Full name: Campo de Rugby de Fuentenueva
- Location: Granada, Andalusia, Spain
- Coordinates: 37°10′57″N 03°36′24.3″W
- Owner: University of Granada
- Capacity: 1.000 spectators
- Surface: natural grass
- Field size: 126 x 68 m

Construction
- Main contractor: Universidad de Granada Rugby

Website
- Fuentenueva

The Fuentenueva rugby field is situated within the sports facilities of the same name owned by University of Granada. In this field are played all the home matches of the C.D. Universidad de Granada Rugby teams, as well as the university selection teams and other teams of the academic entity.

Situated between Calle Rector Martín Ocete, Avenida de Severo Ochoa and the university walkways Professor Juan Ossorio of Granada, is currently, the only rugby-specific stadium in the entire Granada province. With a north–south orientation, it has a capacity of circa 1.000 spectators and it has an only stand at the north end. However, the affluence of fans in both sides of the field is frequent.

Frequently the demolition of the field as part of several projects of expansion of a nearby RENFE station, however, during its last substantial refurbishment as a consequence of the implantation of a train line, which respects the current field position.

== See also ==
- Universidad de Granada Rugby
- Rugby union in Spain
- División de Honor B de Rugby
