= CAU Madrid RC =

Spanish rugby union club, based in Madrid

- Founded: 1961; 65 years ago
- Location: Madrid, Spain
- Ground: Campo de Rugby de Orcasitas
- President: José Luis Ballvé
- League: 1º Regional (Federación de Rugby de Madrid)
1st kit	2nd kit

CAU Madrid Rugby Club, previously known as CAU Metropolitano RC, is a Spanish rugby union team based in Madrid. The acronym originally stood for Club Atlético Universitario - University Athletic Club in Spanish.

Founded in 1961, they currently play in the 1º provincial, Spain's third flight.

== History ==
The club was founded in 1961 by students from the Colegio Alemán Madrid with the name Club Atlético Universitario (CAU). In the first years of its history it competed in the regional Madrid leagues.

The club grew progressively thanks to mergers with other teams and the support of the Spanish University Union (SEU). In 1968, they won their first national title, the second tier Spanish Championship.

In 1970 it was one of the six founding teams of the National Rugby League. With the disappearance of the SEU, the Club Atlético Universitario changed its name to Club Atlético Uros, thus maintaining the same identifying initials.

In 1976 they finished runners-up in the Generalissimo Cup and were champions of the Spanish Youth Championship. It was the beginning of five golden years, with two Copa de Rey titles (1977 and 1978) and two top flight titles (1979 and 1980).

The 1982–83 season, due to the restructuring of the league and the creation of the División de Honor de Rugby, the CAU was omitted from the top division. However, they gained promotion the following year, as champion of the Primera Nacional (the then-name of the second flight). They remained in the Division de Honor for three years. The 1985–86 season was the last of CAU Madrid in the top flight of Spanish rugby. The following five years the club played in the Primera Nacional

In 2005 the club dissolved all its teams, except veterans teams. In 2009 it reintroduced the senior teams by merging with the Metropolitan University Rugby Club, an entity founded in 2002 by students from the Complutense University of Madrid. In 2010–11, they won promotion to the Primera Nacional (by this time the third tier), returning to a national level after twelve years of absence.
