= División de Honor B de Rugby =

Spanish rugby union competition

División de Honor B
- Current season, competition or edition: 2025–26 División de Honor B de Rugby
- Sport: Rugby union
- Founded: 1998; 28 years ago
- Organizing body: FER
- No. of teams: 24
- Country: Spain
- Most recent champion: CR Liceo Francés (2024–25)
- Promotion to: División de Honor Élite
- Relegation to: Regional leagues
- Website: ferugby.es

División de Honor B is the third (2025–2026) level of Spanish league competition for rugby union clubs. The league began in 1998 and consists of three groups (North, East and South) of 8 or 9 teams each. The top 3 teams of each group and two best 4rd-placed teams qualify for promotion playoff.

== Competition ==
=== Format ===
The season takes place between October and April. There are three groups of 12 teams, with every team playing each other home and away for a total of 22 matches. Points are awarded according to the following:

- 4 points for a win
- 2 points for a draw
- 1 bonus point is awarded to a team scoring 4 tries or more in a match
- 1 bonus point is awarded to a team that loses a match by 7 points or fewer

=== Promotion playoffs ===
For the promotion playoff, the teams are seeded by total points. The draw for the promotion playoff is as follows:

Round	Pairing
Quarter-final
Quarter-final	A) 1st vs. 8th
Quarter-final	B) 2nd vs. 7th
Quarter-final	C) 3rd vs. 6th
Quarter-final	D) 4th vs. 5th
Semifinals
Semifinals	E) Winner A) vs. Winner D)
Semifinals	F) Winner B) vs. Winner C)
Final	G) Winner E) vs. Winner F)

== Group system ==
In the División de Honor B, a zoning system is followed for the teams that make up the competition, dividing them into geographical groups numbered as A (North Group), B (Levante Group) and C (Central and South Group). Group A is made up of teams from the northern part of Spain (Asturias, Cantabria, Castilla y León, Galicia, La Rioja, Navarra and Basque Country), Group B is made up of teams from the eastern part (Aragon, Catalonia, Valencian Community, Balearic Islands and Murcia) and Group C is made up of teams from the southern half and central part (Andalusia, Canary Islands, Castilla-La Mancha, Extremadura and Madrid)

For promotion to the División de Honor B, the regional competitions follow a system similar to that of promotion from the División de Honor B to the División de Honor, facing the champions of the different divisions between them to decide the promotion to the corresponding group of the División de Honor B.

In the case of relegations, these are automatically made to the corresponding regional competition, leaving it up to the regional federation to fit the new team into the highest regional category, either by increasing the teams for the season or preventing any promotion between its second and highest category to avoid exceeding the number of teams.

There are some regions, such as the Canary Islands or the autonomous cities of Ceuta and Melilla, which have never had a team playing in the División de Honor B.

== Champions by season ==
Season	Champion	Region
1998–99	Arquitectura	(Community of Madrid)
1999–2000	La Moraleja Alcobendas	(Community of Madrid)
2000–01	CAU Valencia	(Valencian Community)
2001–02	Valencia	(Valencian Community)
2002–03	Getxo	(Basque Country (autonomous community))
2003–04	Ciencias Sevilla	(Andalusia)
2004–05	Ordizia	(Basque Country (autonomous community))
=	La Vila	(Valencian Community)
2005–06	CR Cisneros	(Community of Madrid)
=	CRC Madrid	(Community of Madrid)
2006–07	Alcobendas	(Community of Madrid)
=	Ciencias Sevilla	(Andalusia)
2007–08	Liceo Francés	(Community of Madrid)
=	Les Abelles	(Valencian Community)
2008–09	Gernika	(Basque Country (autonomous community))
=	At. Portuense	(Andalusia)
2009–10	Hernani	(Basque Country (autonomous community))
=	Alcobendas	(Community of Madrid)
2010–11	Getxo	(Basque Country (autonomous community))
=	CRC Madrid	(Community of Madrid)
2011–12	Hernani	(Basque Country (autonomous community))
=	CRC Madrid	(Community of Madrid)
2012–13	Bathco Independiente	(Cantabria)
2013–14	FC Barcelona	(Catalonia)
2014–15	Alcobendas	(Community of Madrid)

Season	Champion	Region
2015–16	Ciencias Sevilla	(Andalusia)
2016–17	La Vila	(Valencian Community)
2017–18	UBU Colina Clinic	(Castile and León)
2018–19	Ciencias Sevilla	(Andalusia)
=	Bathco Independiente	(Cantabria)
2019–20	Getxo	(Basque Country (autonomous community))
=	Les Abelles	(Valencian Community)
2020–21	La Vila	(Valencian Community)
=	Gernika	(Basque Country (autonomous community))
2021–22	Pozuelo Rugby Unión	(Community of Madrid)
=	Belenos	(Asturias)
2022–23	Alcobendas	(Community of Madrid)
2023–24	La Vila	(Valencian Community)
2024–25	Liceo Francés	(Community of Madrid)

== See also ==
- División de Honor de Rugby
- Rugby union in Spain
