= Catalonia national rugby union team =

Catalonia
- Nickname: El XV de la ginesta (the XV of the Broom)
- Emblem: Spanish broom flower
- Union: Catalan Rugby Federation (Catalan: Federació Catalana de Rugbi)
- Head coach: Álvaro Hompanera
- Home stadium: Camp de la Foixarda
First colours	Second colours

First international
- Catalonia 5 – 5 Italy (Camp de Les Corts; 14 April 1934)

Biggest win
- Catalonia 66 – 6 Andorra (Sant Boi; 25 March 1995)

Biggest defeat
- Catalonia 15 – 67 Russia (L'Hospitalet; 24 March 1998)
- Website: www.rugby.cat

The Catalonia national rugby union team is the national and/or representative rugby union team of Catalonia. It is organised by the Catalan Rugby Federation and has been active since 1923. On 14 April 1934 they made their international debut with a 5–5 draw at the Camp de Les Corts against Italy.

== History ==
The Catalan Rugby Federation was founded in 1922 and the national rugby union team made their debut on 21 May 1923, losing 9–0 to Toulouse Lanlade Olimpique at the l'Hipòdrom de Can Tunis. During the early 1930s they played against various French club and provincial teams. In 1930 they also twice played a visiting Royal Navy XV and also embarked on brief tour of Germany. In March 1934 Catalonia became a founding member of the Fédération Internationale de Rugby Amateur and on 14 April 1934 they made their international debut with a 5–5 draw at the Camp de Les Corts against Italy. On 27 May 1934 Catalonia played their first international against France, losing 15–22. After the Spanish Civil War, Catalonia lost its sporting independence. This saw the Catalan Rugby Federation lose its full membership of FIRA and the right to organise full international games. Despite these restrictions, the Catalonia national rugby union team continues to play friendlies against international teams as well as club and provincial teams. The Catalan Rugby Federation has also campaigned for its full membership of Rugby Europe to be restored, citing founding members rights of FIRA (now Rugby Europe) and comparing their stance to that of England, Scotland, and Wales, who do not compete in a unified Great Britain team, but rather as individual entities and founding members of the IRB (now World Rugby).

== Matches ==
=== Internationals ===
Date	Home	Score	Away	Venue
14 April 1934	Catalonia	5–5	Italy ^{[Note 1]}	Camp de Les Corts
27 May 1934	Catalonia	15–22	France ^{[Note 1]}	Camp de Les Corts
24 March 1935	Italy	5–3	Catalonia ^{[Note 1]}	Stadio Luigi Ferraris
6 July 1936	Catalonia	17–24	France ^{[Note 1]}	Barcelona
January 1940	Catalonia	?	Romania ^{[Note 2]}	Camp de Les Corts
27 Nov 1955	Catalonia	20–5	England XV	Camp de la Foixarda
29 Nov 1955	Catalonia	0–11	England XV	Camp de la Foixarda
25 Sept. 1960	Catalonia	26–3	Ireland Universities	Camp de la Foixarda
21 May 1972	Catalonia	31–17	France XV	L'Hospitalet de Llobregat
1980	Catalonia	16–3	England XV	
11 June 1982	Catalonia	17–22	Ireland XV	Camp de la Foixarda
13 June 1982	Catalonia	24–17	Scotland XV	Camp de la Foixarda
13 January 1990	Catalonia	8–34	Italy	Argelès-sur-Mer
22 April 1990	Catalonia	16–15	Tunisia	Andorra la Vella
11 May 1990	Basque Country	56–15	Catalonia	San Mamés
25 March 1995	Catalonia	66–6	Andorra	Estadi Baldiri Aleu Sant Boi de Llobregat
6 April 1995	Catalonia	40–12	Czech Republic	Barcelona
3 May 1997	Catalonia	61–17	Spain	Estadi Baldiri Aleu ^{[Note 3]}
28 May 1997	Catalonia	18–58	France	Estadi Olímpic ^{[Note 3]}
24 March 1998	Catalonia	15–67	Russia	L'Hospitalet de Llobregat
13 June 1998	Catalonia	19–40	Italy	Estadi La Feixa Llarga
18 June 2006	Catalonia	17–21	Basque Country	Cornellà
14 February 2010	Catalonia	17–21	Sweden	Estadi Baldiri Aleu
25 Sept. 2010	Catalonia	12–29	France Classic	Camp de la Foixarda
21 Sept. 2013	Catalonia	64–10	Andorra	Camp de la Foixarda
25 June 2016	Catalonia	25–22	Portugal XV	Camp de la Foixarda
5 March 2023	Catalonia	54–14	Sweden	Camp de la Foixarda

Notes

- ^1 Recognised as full internationals by Rugby Europe
- ^2 In January 1940 Catalonia played two games against a Bucharest XV. The Catalan Rugby Federation refers to one of these games as an international against Romania.
- ^3 75th Anniversary of the Catalan Rugby Federation.

=== Spanish Regions Championship finals ===
Since 1983–84 Catalonia have competed in the Spanish Regions Championship, featuring other teams, such as the Basque Country, representing the autonomous communities of Spain. This competition is organised by the Spanish Rugby Federation.

Season	Date	Home	Score	Away	Venue
1983–84	26 February 1984	Basque Country	24–12	Catalonia	
1984–85	3 March 1985	Basque Country	25–4	Catalonia	
1985–86	18 May 1986	(Community of Madrid) Madrid	13–12	Catalonia	
1987–88	5 June 1988	Catalonia	16–9	Basque Country	
1988–89	28 May 1989	Catalonia	21–20	(Castile and León) Castile-León	
1989–90	8 June 1990	(Castile and León) Castile-León	20–16	Catalonia	
1990–91	19 May 1991	Catalonia	19–16	(Castile and León) Castile-León	
1993–94		Basque Country	28–10	Catalonia	
1995–96	19 Nov 1995	Basque Country	25–17	Catalonia	
1996–97	3 Nov 1996	Basque Country	37–14	Catalonia	Guernica
1997–98	7 December 1997	Basque Country	29–8	Catalonia	Tudela, Navarre
1999–2000	5 December 1999	Catalonia	10–9	Andalusia	Camp de la Foixarda

== Honours ==
- Spanish Regions Championship
  - Winners: 1987–88, 1988–89, 1990–91, 1991–92, 1999–2000: 5
  - Runners-up: 1983–84, 1984–85, 1985–86, 1989–90, 1993–94, 1995–96, 1996–97, 1997–98: 8

== 2010 squad ==
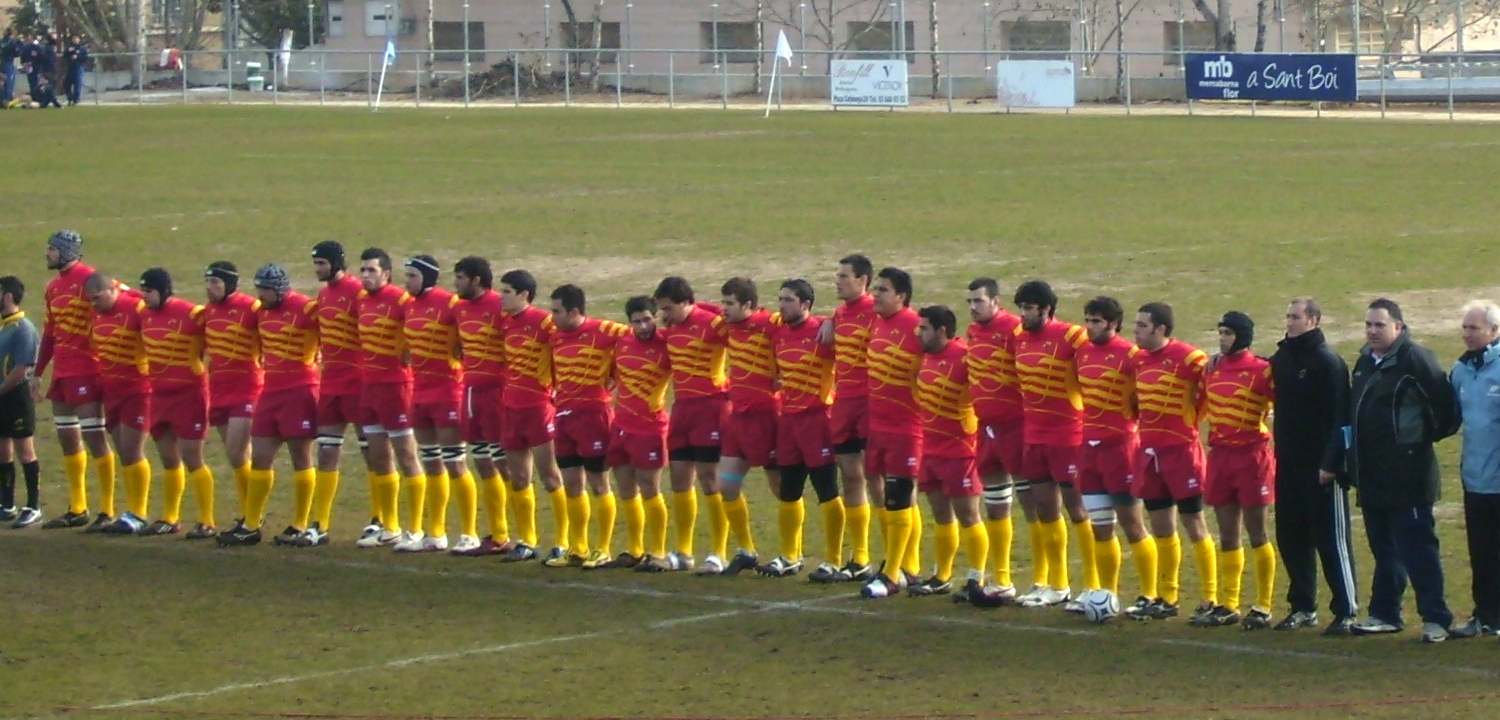
Catalonia vs Sweden in 2010

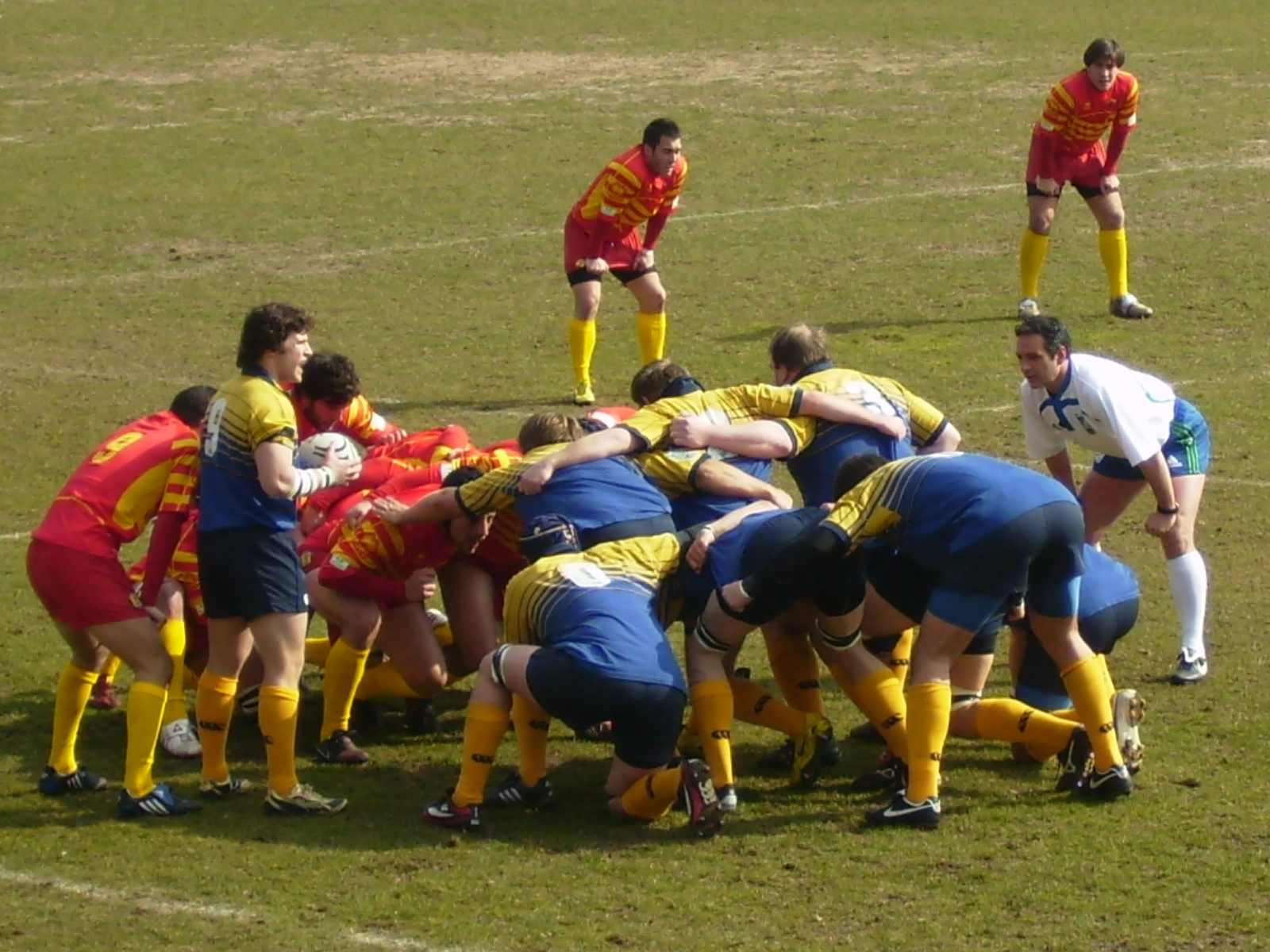
Catalonia vs Sweden in 2010

Catalonia vs. Sweden (2010)

#	Name	Club
1	Josep Raya	CR Sant Cugat
2	Omar Miniño	UE Santboiana
3	Marc González	BUC
4	Pol Massoni	UE Santboiana
5	Ignacio Gaminde	RC l'Hospitalet
6	Ivan Gurriere	FC Barcelona
7	Andrés Rangel	CR Sant Cugat
8	Sergi Guerrero	UE Santboiana
9	Marc Puigvert	UE Santboiana
10	Àlex Benet	CN Poble Nou
11	Cristian Martín	UE Santboiana
12	Sebastià Fernández	FC Barcelona
13	Sergi Aubanell	UE Santboiana
14	Jordi Sánchez	BUC
15	Geoffroy Lourdou	CR Sant Cugat
16	Leo Paredes	CR Sant Cugat
17	Óscar Ferreras	RC l'Hospitalet
18	Gerard Blasco	RC l'Hospitalet
19	Àlex Palomo	UE Santboiana
20	David Porto	SEL Vilanova
21	Víctor Linares	Químic RC
22	Pau Puigdollers	CR Sant Cugat
23	Ignasi Baqué	RC l'Hospitalet

== Catalan qualified players who represented other qualified international teams ==
=== Men's internationals ===
Algeria

- Sadek Deghmache

Catalonia (1934–1941)

- Josep Aguilar ^{(C&S)}
- Baldiri Aleu
- Bartomeu Balcells^{(C&S)}
- Baltasar
- Joan Bisbal
- Vicenç Bisbal^{(C&S)}
- Baudili Ejia^{(C&S)}
- Jaume Garrigosa^{(C&S)}
- Gual
- Jaume Juanes^{(C&S)}
- Joan Massoni^{(C&S)}
- Josep Miret
- Antoni Nuvials^{(C&S)}
- Miquel Puigdeval^{(C&S)}
- Riera
- Eduard Ruiz^{(C&S)}
- Jordán Vallmajo
- Antoni Vilaespasa

^{(C&S:this players represented the Catalonia and the Spain rugby team)}
France

- Roger Aguerre
- Patrick Arlettaz
- Marcel Baillette
- Paul Barrère
- Raoul Barrière
- Stéphane de Bésombes
- Yves Brunet
- Noël Brazès
- Ernest Camo
- Jean Carbonne
- Jean Carrère
- Frédéric Cermeno
- Jean Coderc
- Georges Constant
- Amedee Cutzach
- Vincent Debaty
- Francis Desclaux
- Joseph Desclaux
- Enzo Forletta
- Théo Forner
- Roger Furcade
- Jean Gachassin
- Henri Galau
- Jean Galia
- Fabien Galthié
- Joseph Galy
- Cédric Garcia
- Pierre-Emmanuel Garcia
- Georges Gauby
- Raoul Got
- Bernard Goutta
- Vincent Graule
- Guilhem Guirado
- Jean-François Imbernon
- Melvyn Jaminet
- Pierre Jeanjean
- Gilbert Lavail
- Marc Lièvremont
- Matthieu Lièvremont
- Thomas Lièvremont
- Sacha Lotrian
- Alain Macabiau
- Brice Mach
- David Marty
- Nicolas Mas
- Jep Maso
- Jo Maso
- Lucien Mias
- René Monié
- Camille Montade
- Olivier Olibeau
- Dacien Olive
- Jacques Palat
- Joseph Pascot
- Étienne Piquiral
- Adrien Planté
- Pierre Pons
- Jérôme Porical
- Maurice Porra
- Alphonse Puig
- Roger Ramis
- Raymond Rébujent
- Eugène Ribère
- Jean-Pierre Romeu
- Gérard Roucariès
- André Sanac
- Joseph Sayrou
- Laurent Sempéré
- Jérôme Schuster
- Noël Sicart
- Farid Sid
- Marcel Soler
- Romain Taofifénua
- Sébastien Taofifénua
- Serge Torreilles
- Posolo Tuilagi
- Georges Vaills
- Fernand Vaquer
- Quentin Walcker

Ireland

- Jordi Murphy

Italy

- Giovanni Antoni

South Africa

- Bryan Habana

Spain

- Josep Aguilar^{(C&S)}
- Mario Auzmendi
- Bartomeu Balcells^{(C&S)}
- Vicenç Bisbal^{(C&S)}
- Joan Blanquet
- Jordi Camps
- Baudili Ejia^{(C&S)}
- Joan Escoda
- Miguel Escoda
- Samuel Ezeala
- Enrique Font
- Jaume Garrigosa^{(C&S)}
- Jordi Jorba
- Jaume Juanes^{(C&S)}
- Sergi Loughney
- Joan Lluis
- Alberto Malo
- Victor Marlet
- Héctor Massoni^{(C&S)}
- Juan Massoni
- Joël Merkler
- Antoni Nuvials^{(C&S)}
- Isidro Oller
- Marco Pinto
- Miquel Puigdeval^{(C&S)}
- Daniel Ripol
- Oriol Ripol
- Roger Ripol
- Fabien Rofes
- Eduard Ruiz^{(C&S)}
- Narciso Trull
- Imanol Urraza
- Marc Ventura
- Ferran Velazco
- Antoni Vilaespasa^{(C&S)}

^{(C&S:this players represented the Catalonia and the Spain rugby team)}

=== Women's internationals ===
France

- Aurélie Bailon
- Marie Bourret
- Maud Camatta
- Catherine Devillers
- Anaïs Grando
- Fanny Horta
- Myriam Loyez
- Marion Talayrach

Spain

- Anna Agustí
- Anna Arnau
- Meritxell Basté
- Mercedes Bastidor
- Marta Cabané
- Rosa Calafat
- Alba Capell
- Marta Carreras
- Meritxell Carreras
- Núria Carreras
- Alexandra Castillón
- Clara Costa
- Marta Costa
- Ana Isabel Dolera
- Helena Estevan
- Paz Estevan
- África Félez
- Raquel García
- Diana Gassó
- Aroa González
- Marta Gran
- María Losada
- Elisabet Martínez
- Susanna Monclús
- Ángela del Pan
- Bárbara Plà
- Clàudia Peña
- Olga Pons
- Montserrat Poza
- Anna Puig
- Anna Ramón
- Otília Roca
- Carla Rodríguez
- Beth Segarra
- María del Carmen Sequedo
- Judith Vèlez
- Coral Vila
- Mariona Vila

== See also ==
- Rugby union in Catalonia
