= 2012–13 División de Honor Femenina de Rugby =

2012–13 División de Honor Femenina
- Countries: Spain
- Number of teams: 8
- Date: 27 January 2013 – 17 March 2013
- Champions: INEF Barcelona (10th title)
- Runners-up: Olímpico de Pozuelo
- Relegated: Gòtics RC
- Matches played: 28

The 2012–13 División de Honor Femenina de Rugby was the 3rd season of the División de Honor, the top flight of Spanish domestic women's rugby union competition. The reigning champions entering the season where INEF Barcelona who claimed their 9th title after winning all their matches in the previous edition.

INEF Barcelona won all their matches, and the championship, which was their 10th national title.

== Teams ==
2012–13 División de Honor Teams

Eight teams competed in the league – the top seven teams from the previous season and Gòtics RC who were promoted as champions of the promotion regional tournament.

Team	Head coach	Stadium	City
(Basque Country (autonomous community)) Bizkarians	Aitor Mezo	Polideportivo Fadura	Getxo
(Community of Madrid) Complutense Cisneros	Jaime Marina	Campo Central CIU	Madrid
(Galicia (Spain)) CRAT Universidade da Coruña	Rogelio Sabio; Javier Lista	Elviña	A Coruña
(Catalonia) G.E.i.E.G.	Coral Vila	Complex Esportiu Palau Sacosta	Girona
(Catalonia) Gòtics RC	Eva Serra	La Foixarda	Barcelona
(Catalonia) INEF Barcelona	Meritxell Urbiola	Feixa Llarga	L'Hospitalet de Llobregat
(Community of Madrid) Majadahonda	Carmen Blanco	Valle del Arcipreste	Majadahonda
(Community of Madrid) Olímpico de Pozuelo	Cándido Fernández; Rocío Ramírez	Valle de las Cañas	Pozuelo de Alarcón

== Table ==
Pos	Team	P	W	D	L	PF	PA	PD	BP	Pts
1	INEF Barcelona	7	7	0	0	314	57	257	5	33
2	Olímpico de Pozuelo	7	6	0	1	317	73	244	7	31
3	CRAT Universidade da Coruña	7	5	0	2	306	83	223	5	25
4	Complutense Cisneros	7	4	0	3	181	160	21	4	20
5	Majadahonda	7	2	0	5	115	267	-152	3	11
6	Bizkarians	7	2	0	5	96	219	-123	2	10
7	G.E.i.E.G.	7	2	0	5	113	262	-149	2	10
8	Gòtics RC	7	0	0	7	36	357	-321	1	1
Second to last plays a relegation playoff against Honor Division B runner-up. Last placed plays a relegation playoff against Honor Division B winner.

== Fixtures ==
=== Round 1 ===
27 January 2013	Bizkarians	12–45	CRAT Universidade da Coruña (1BP)	Atxurizubi Kalea, Mungia
	Try: Idioia 77' m Penalty Try 79' c Con: Eva 79'		Try: Vanessa (3) 5' c, 13' c, 38' c Elsa 23' c Berta (2) 62' m, 67' c Nerea 80+3'; Con: Helen (5) 5', 13, 23', 38', 67'	Referee: Eki Fanlo (FER)

27 January 2013	(1BP) G.E.i.E.G.	26–17	Majadahonda	Complex Esportiu Palau Sacosta, Girona
	Try: Júlia Plà (3) 5', 43', 53'; Elisabet Martínez 10' c Con: Txiqui Carreras (2) 10' +1 more		Try: Casado 19'; Hernández-Vaquero 31'; Domínguez 63' m Con: Velasco

27 January 2013	(1BP) INEF Barcelona	34–10	Complutense Cisneros	Feixa Llarga, L'Hospitalet de Llobregat

27 January 2013	Gòtics RC	3–71	Olímpico de Pozuelo (1BP)	La Foixarda, Barcelona

=== Round 2 ===
2 February 2013	(1BP) Olímpico de Pozuelo	12–17	INEF Barcelona	Valle de las Cañas, Pozuelo de Alarcón
16:00 CET (UTC+1)

2 February 2013	Gòtics RC	0–25	Bizkarians (1BP)	La Foixarda, Barcelona
16:00 CET (UTC+1)

3 February 2013	(1BP) Complutense Cisneros	38–17	G.E.i.E.G.	Campo Central CIU, Madrid
12:00 CET (UTC+1)	Try: Marina Bravo m Begoña 20' m Bea 27' m Ángela 40' m Lía Bailán m Anabel Pérez (2) 70' m, 75' m Pen: Marina Bravo 14'		Try: Julia Plá (2) 31', 34'; Eli Martinez 63' m Con: 1

3 February 2013	Majadahonda	17–43	CRAT Universidade da Coruña (1BP)	Valle del Arcipreste, Majadahonda
13:00 CET (UTC+1)

=== Round 3 ===
10 February 2013	(1BP) Majadahonda	22–14	Bizkarians	Valle del Arcipreste, Majadahonda

10 February 2013	(1BP) CRAT Universidade da Coruña	55–0	Complutense Cisneros	Elviña, A Coruña
	Try: Berta García (3) 5' m, 20' m, 75' c Maijo Porcar 28' c Shaan Waru 30' c Vanessa Rial 43' c Turena Mikaela 58' m Nerea Fernández 64' c Silvie Christinat 80' m Con: Berta García (5) 28', 30', 43', 64', 75'

10 February 2013	G.E.i.E.G.	14–57	Olímpico de Pozuelo (1BP)	Complex Esportiu Palau Sacosta, Girona
	Try: Martínez 19' c Carreras 34' c Con: Carreras (2) 19', 34'		Try: Lee 22' m Hess (4) 24' m, 43' c, 50' c, 70' m Kerney (2) 32' c, 41' c Penalty Try 55' c Torres 58' c Con: García (6) 32', 41', 43', 50', 55', 58'	Referee: Joan Aloy (FER)

10 February 2013	(1BP) INEF Barcelona	59–3	Gòtics RC	Feixa Llarga, L'Hospitalet de Llobregat

=== Round 4 ===
16 February 2013	(1BP) Complutense Cisneros	40–27	Majadahonda (1BP)	Campo Central CIU, Madrid
14:00 CET (UTC+1)

16 February 2013	(1BP) Gòtics RC	20–33	G.E.i.E.G. (1BP)	La Foixarda, Barcelona
16:00 CET (UTC+1)	Try: Gasso 38' m Fornells 54' m Borras 64' m Sequedo 78' m		Try: Martínez (3) 10' c, 26' c, 70' c Carreras 32' c Félez 60' m Con: Carreras (4) 10', 26', 32', 70'	Referee: Antoni Rodríguez (FER)

16 February 2013	Bizkarians	10–48	INEF Barcelona (1BP)	Campo de Rugby Ardanza, Plentzia
16:00 CET (UTC+1)

17 February 2013	(1BP) Olímpico de Pozuelo	27–12	CRAT Universidade da Coruña	Valle de las Cañas, Pozuelo de Alarcón
12:30 CET (UTC+1)

=== Round 5 ===
2 March 2013	G.E.i.E.G.	10–64	INEF Barcelona (1BP)	Complex Esportiu Palau Sacosta, Girona
14:30 CET (UTC+1)

2 March 2013	(1BP) Complutense Cisneros	32–5	Bizkarians	Campo Central CIU, Madrid
15:15 CET (UTC+1)

2 March 2013	(1BP) CRAT Universidade da Coruña	100–0	Gòtics RC	Elviña, A Coruña
16:30 CET (UTC+1)	Try: Berta García (3) 1' m, 33' c, 80' c Rocío Garcia (3) 13' c, 21' m, 41' m Elsa Porto 17' m Paula Medín (2) 26' c, 77' m Shaan Waru (2) 48' m, 61' c Vanessa Rial 53' c Silvie Christinat (3) 65' c, 73' c, 79' c Elena Roca 59' c Con: Elena Roca (9) 13', 26', 33', 56', 59', 61', 73', 79', 80'; Vanessa Rial 53'

3 March 2013	Majadahonda	10–64	Olímpico de Pozuelo (1BP)	Valle del Arcipreste, Majadahonda
16:00 CET (UTC+1)

=== Round 6 ===
10 March 2013	(1BP) Olímpico de Pozuelo	22–14	Complutense Cisneros	Valle de las Cañas, Pozuelo de Alarcón

10 March 2013	(1BP) Bizkarians	27–8	G.E.i.E.G.	Polideportivo Fadura, Getxo
11:30 CET (UTC+1)

10 March 2013	INEF Barcelona	22–12	CRAT Universidade da Coruña	Feixa Llarga, L'Hospitalet de Llobregat
12:00 CET (UTC+1)	Try: Anna Ramon 20' m Laura Esbri 47' c +1 more Con: 2 Drop: Meritxell Urbiola 46'; Cards: Alysha Stone (yellow card); Aroa Gonzalez (yellow card)		Try: Elena Roca; Sylvie Christinat 60' m Con: 1 Cards: Elena Roca (yellow card)

10 March 2013	Gòtics RC	10–22	Majadahonda (1BP)	La Foixarda, Barcelona
12:30 CET (UTC+1)				Referee: Joan Aloy (FER)

=== Round 7 ===
16 March 2013	Majadahonda	0–70	INEF Barcelona (1BP)	Valle del Arcipreste, Majadahonda
16:00 CET (UTC+1)

17 March 2013	(1BP) Complutense Cisneros	47–0	Gòtics RC	Puerta de Hierro, Madrid

17 March 2013	(1BP) Olímpico de Pozuelo	64–3	Bizkarians	Valle de las Cañas, Pozuelo de Alarcón

17 March 2013	(1BP) CRAT Universidade da Coruña	39–5	G.E.i.E.G.	Elviña, A Coruña
16:00 CET (UTC+1)

=== Relegation ===
6 April 2013	Sanse Scrum	20–15	Gòtics RC	Ejea de los Caballeros
17:00 CEST (UTC+2)	Try: Paula Pacorbo; Sara Ramírez; Lidia Olivares; Eva García		Try: Mari Sequedo; Diana Gassó; Arantza Olabarria

7 April 2013	G.E.i.E.G.	24–3	La Única RT	Berbegal
14:00 CEST (UTC+2)	Try: Elizabet Martinez (3); Africa Felez; Con: 2		Pen: Arantxa Ursua
