= 2011–12 Top 14 season =

French domestic rugby union club competition

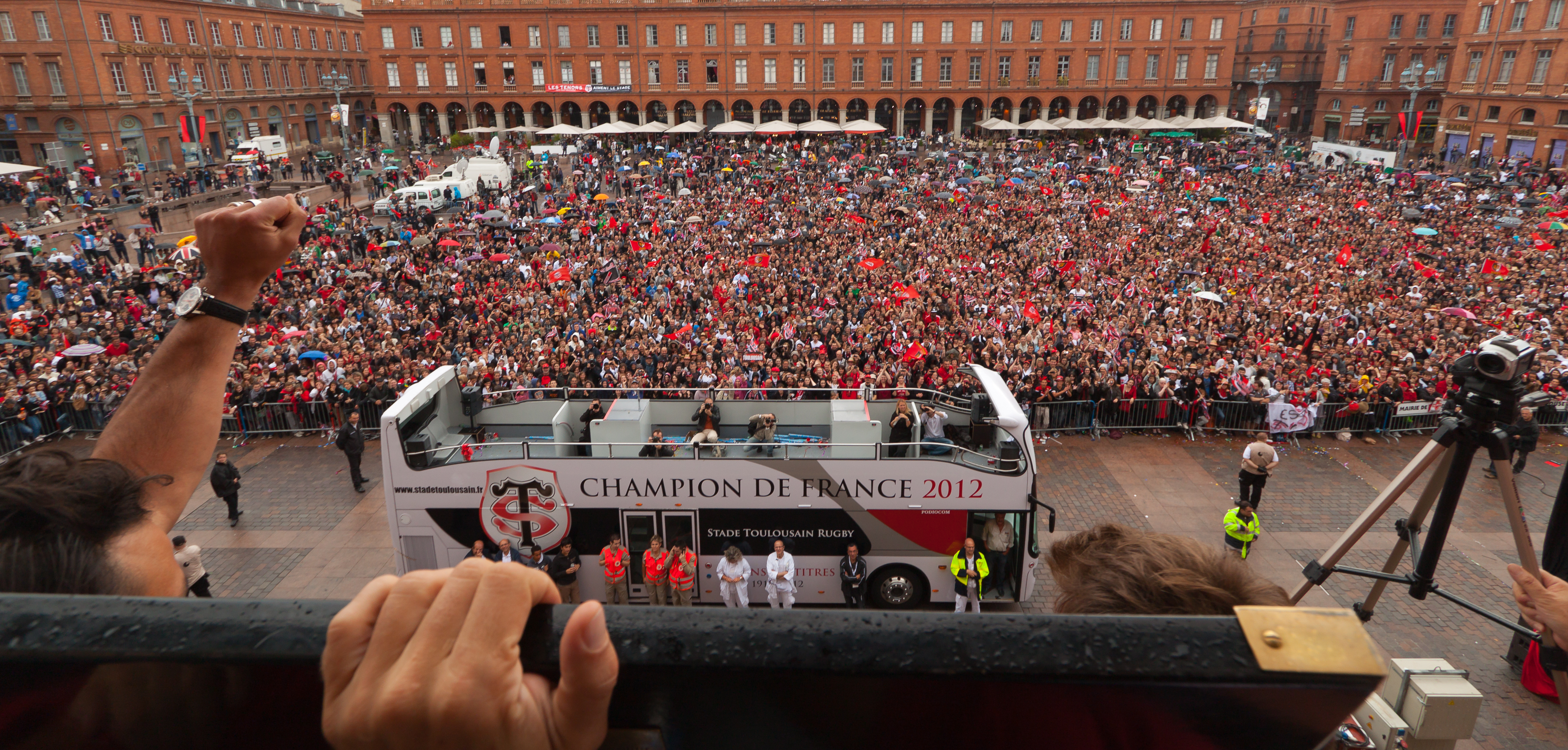
- Countries: France
- Champions: Toulouse
- Runners-up: Toulon
- Relegated: Brive; Lyon
- Matches played: 183
- Attendance: 2,566,416 (average 14,024 per match)
- Top point scorer: (England) Jonny Wilkinson (273)
- Top try scorer: (Fiji) Timoci Nagusa (11)

The 2011–12 Top 14 competition was a French domestic rugby union club competition operated by the Ligue Nationale de Rugby (LNR). Home-and-away play began on August 26, 2011. Two new teams from the 2010–11 Rugby Pro D2 season were promoted to Top 14 this year, Lyon and Bordeaux Bègles in place of the two relegated teams, La Rochelle and Bourgoin.

Toulouse claimed the Bouclier de Brennus as champions for the 19th time, defeating Toulon 18–12 in the final on June 9, 2012, at Stade de France in Saint-Denis. At the other end of the table, Brive and Lyon were relegated.

== Competition format ==
Each club played every other club twice. The second half of the season was conducted in the same order as the first, with the club at home in the first half of the season away in the second. This season maintained the format introduced the previous season for the knockout stage: the top two teams qualified directly to the semifinals, while teams ranked from third to sixth qualified for a quarterfinal held at the home ground of the higher-ranked team.

== The teams ==
Locations of the 2011–12 Top 14 teams

| Team | Captain | Head coach | Stadium | Capacity |
|---|---|---|---|---|
| Agen | (South Africa) Adri Badenhorst | (France) Christophe Deylaud (France) Christian Lanta | Stade Armandie | 14,600 |
| Bayonne | (France) Pépito Elhorga | (France) Didier Faugeron | Stade Jean-Dauger | 16,934 |
| Biarritz | (France) Imanol Harinordoquy | (Australia) Jack Isaac and (France) Jean-Michel Gonzalez | Parc des Sports Aguiléra | 15,000 |
| Bordeaux Bègles | (New Zealand) Matthew Clarkin | (France) Marc Delpoux (France) Laurent Armand (France) Vincent Etcheto | Stade André Moga | 9,088 |
| Brive | (South Africa) Antonie Claassen | (France) Ugo Mola | Stade Amédée-Domenech | 15,000 |
| Castres | (France) Alexandre Albouy (France) Sébastien Tillous-Borde | (France) Laurent Labit and (France) Laurent Travers | Stade Pierre-Antoine | 11,500 |
| Clermont | (France) Aurélien Rougerie | (New Zealand) Vern Cotter | Stade Marcel-Michelin | 16,334 |
| Lyon | | (France) Matthieu Lazerges (France) Raphaël Saint-André | Matmut Stadium | 8,000 |
| Montpellier | (France) Fulgence Ouedraogo | (France) Fabien Galthié | Stade Yves-du-Manoir | 15,000 |
| Perpignan | (France) Nicolas Mas | (France) Bernard Goutta (France) Christophe Manas | Stade Aimé-Giral | 16,593 |
| Racing Métro | (France) Lionel Nallet | (France) Pierre Berbizier | Stade Olympique Yves-du-Manoir | 14,000 |
| Stade Français | (Italy) Sergio Parisse | (Australia) Michael Cheika | Stade Charléty | 20,000 |
| Stade Français | (Italy) Sergio Parisse | (Australia) Michael Cheika | Stade de France | 80,000 |
| Toulon | (South Africa) Joe van Niekerk | (France) Bernard Laporte | Stade Mayol | 14,700 |
| Toulouse | (France) Thierry Dusautoir | (France) Guy Novès | Stade Ernest-Wallon | 19,500 |
| Toulouse | (France) Thierry Dusautoir | (France) Guy Novès | Stadium Municipal | 35,472 |

During the regular season, three teams changed coaches a total of four times:

- Toulon was forced to find a replacement for Philippe Saint-André once he was named to become the new head coach of the France national team, effective 1 December. Bernard Laporte, a former France head coach (1999–2007), was named as Toulon's new head coach, and took over in September after Saint-André was granted an early release by Toulon.
- Perpignan sacked Jacques Delmas on 21 November, only four months after he had taken over from Jacques Brunel, who left to become the new head coach of Italy. The Catalans had lost seven of their 12 matches in all competitions under Delmas. Assistants Bernard Goutta and Christophe Manas were named as replacements.
- Bayonne sacked their entire coaching staff—director of rugby Christian Gajan, forwards coach Thomas Lièvremont and backs coach Frédéric Tauzin—on 6 December. Gajan's position was filled by Jean-Pierre Élissalde, former Japan head coach and also father of former France international and current Toulouse backs coach Jean-Baptiste Élissalde. After six weeks, in which Bayonne remained near the bottom of the table with two losses and one draw in league play, Élissalde was sacked on 16 January, with former Stade Français head coach Didier Faugeron named as his replacement.

== Table ==
| Pos | Team | Pld | W | D | L | PF | PA | PD | B | Pts | Qualification or relegation |
|---|---|---|---|---|---|---|---|---|---|---|---|
| 1 | Toulouse | 26 | 19 | 1 | 6 | 629 | 448 | +181 | 9 | 87 | League champions Qualified for the 2012–13 Heineken Cup |
| 2 | Clermont | 26 | 19 | 2 | 5 | 644 | 364 | +280 | 7 | 87 (Note: Head-to-head: Toulouse 5–4) | Advance to playoff semi-finals Qualified for the 2012–13 Heineken Cup |
| 3 | Toulon | 26 | 14 | 5 | 7 | 581 | 393 | +188 | 7 | 73 | Advance to playoff quarter-finals Qualified for the 2012–13 Heineken Cup |
| 4 | Castres | 26 | 14 | 4 | 8 | 585 | 522 | +63 | 5 | 69 | Advance to playoff quarter-finals Qualified for the 2012–13 Heineken Cup |
| 5 | Montpellier | 26 | 14 | 1 | 11 | 601 | 505 | +96 | 9 | 67 | Qualified for the 2012–13 Heineken Cup |
| 6 | Racing Métro | 26 | 13 | 1 | 12 | 569 | 538 | +31 | 10 | 64 | Qualified for the 2012–13 Heineken Cup |
| 7 | Stade Français | 26 | 11 | 2 | 13 | 568 | 588 | −20 | 10 | 58 | |
| 8 | Bordeaux Bègles | 26 | 12 | 0 | 14 | 493 | 619 | −126 | 5 | 53 | |
| 9 | Biarritz | 26 | 10 | 2 | 14 | 424 | 518 | −94 | 8 | 52 (Note: Head-to-head: Biarritz 6–2) | Qualified for the 2012–13 Heineken Cup (Note: Qualified by winning the 2011–12 European Challenge Cup) |
| 10 | Agen | 26 | 12 | 1 | 13 | 479 | 573 | −94 | 2 | 52 | |
| 11 | Perpignan | 26 | 9 | 2 | 15 | 515 | 578 | −63 | 9 | 49 | |
| 12 | Bayonne | 26 | 9 | 3 | 14 | 479 | 619 | −140 | 6 | 48 | |
| 13 | Brive | 26 | 7 | 1 | 18 | 408 | 488 | −80 | 12 | 42 | Relegated to 2012–13 Rugby Pro D2 |
| 14 | Lyon | 26 | 5 | 3 | 18 | 369 | 591 | −222 | 5 | 31 | Relegated to 2012–13 Rugby Pro D2 |

Notes:

Due to the interplay between LNR's schedule for Heineken Cup qualification and the rules of European Rugby Cup (ERC), which operates both European cup competitions, it is theoretically possible that a team finishing as high as fourth in the league table may not qualify for the Heineken Cup. Under ERC rules, the winners of the Heineken Cup and European Challenge Cup each earn a place in the following season's Heineken Cup. If a team from France wins one of these competitions, the Top 14 will receive a seventh Heineken Cup place. However, if French teams win both cups, the Top 14 is capped at seven Heineken Cup places. Biarritz' victory in the Challenge Cup gave France an extra place for the 2012–13 Heineken Cup.

The LNR presents teams for the Heineken Cup in the following order, skipping any steps occupied by clubs outside the Top 14 or filled in a prior step. The clubs involved in each step for this season are indicated in the numbered list.

1. Champion – Toulouse
2. Runner-up – Toulon
3. Heineken Cup holder – Skipped (won by Leinster of Pro12)
4. Semifinalist that finished higher in the league table – Clermont
5. Semifinalist that finished lower in the league table – Castres
6. Challenge Cup holder – Biarritz
7. Additional berths based on league position – Montpellier, Racing Métro

Under LNR rules, only Top 14 clubs are eligible for European competition. This means that in the (unlikely) event that the winner of one of the two European Cups is relegated from the Top 14 in the same season, its European place will go to a current Top 14 team, based on league position in that season.

Under another ERC rule, if teams from England, which is also capped at seven Heineken Cup places, win both European cups, the extra place will go to the highest-ranked non-English team in the European Rugby Club Rankings that is not already qualified for the Heineken Cup. If that club is in the Top 14, it will receive a Heineken Cup place regardless of its league position, as long as it avoids relegation.

For a team in the top six to be left out of the Heineken Cup, French teams must win both European Cups, and those teams must have finished outside the top six in the league while also avoiding relegation.

== Playoffs ==
Quarterfinals
4 | Castres | 31
5 | Montpellier | 15
3 | Toulon | 17
6 | Racing Métro | 13

Semifinals
1 | Toulouse | 24
4 | Castres | 15
2 | Clermont | 12
3 | Toulon | 15

Final
1 | Toulouse | 18
3 | Toulon | 12

All times are in Central European Summer Time (UTC+2).

=== Quarter-finals ===
25 May 2012
21:00

| Castres | 31 – 15 | Montpellier |
| Try: Lacrampe 18' c Con: Teulet (1/1); Pen: Bernard (5/5) 2', 33', 44', 50', 80'; Teulet (3/3) 15', 38', 72' | Report | Try: Tulou 36' m Fakate 68' c Con: Bustos Moyano (1/2); Pen: Bustos Moyano (1/1) 23' |

Stade Ernest-Wallon, Toulouse
Attendance: 15,203
Referee: Patrick Péchambert

26 May 2012
21:00

| Toulon | 17 – 13 | Racing Métro |
| Try: Armitage 66' m Pen: Wilkinson 35'; Giteau (3) 58', 62', 80' | Report | Try: Fall 27' c Con: Descons (1/1); Pen: Steyn 16'; Descons 32 |

Stade Mayol, Toulon
Referee: Mathieu Raynal

=== Semi-finals ===
2 June 2012
20:45

| Toulouse | 24 – 15 | Castres |
| Pen: McAlister (6/6) 6', 11', 29', 51', 61', 71'; Beauxis (1/1) 39'; Drop: Beauxis (1/1) 20' | Report | Pen: Bernard (3) 18', 26', 46'; Teulet 37'; Drop: Bernard (1/1) 22' |

Stadium de Toulouse, Toulouse
Attendance: 36,121
Referee: Jérôme Garcès

3 June 2012
16:30

| Clermont | 12 – 15 | Toulon |
| Pen: Parra (4/5) 8', 30', 62', 73' | Report | Pen: Wilkinson (5/5) 12', 22', 34', 59', 77' |

Stadium de Toulouse, Toulouse
Attendance: 35,608
Referee: Pascal Gaüzère

=== Final ===
9 June 2012
18:00

| Toulouse | 18 – 12 | Toulon |
| Pen: McAlister (6/6) 3', 21', 35', 42', 64', 68' | Report | Pen: Wilkinson (4/6) 1', 27', 32', 46' |

Stade de France, Saint-Denis
Attendance: 79,612
Referee: Romain Poite

| FB | 15 | (France) Clément Poitrenaud |
| RW | 14 | (France) Vincent Clerc |
| OC | 13 | (France) Yann David | (substituted off) 61' |
| IC | 12 | (France) Florian Fritz |
| LW | 11 | (Fiji) Timoci Matanavou |
| FH | 10 | (New Zealand) Luke McAlister | (substituted off) 70' |
| SH | 9 | (France) Jean-Marc Doussain | (substituted off) 50' |
| N8 | 8 | (France) Louis Picamoles |
| OF | 7 | (France) Thierry Dusautoir (c) |
| BF | 6 | (France) Jean Bouilhou | (substituted off) 53' (substituted on) 62' (substituted off) 68' |
| RL | 5 | (Argentina) Patricio Albacete |
| LL | 4 | (France) Yoann Maestri | (substituted off) 76' |
| TP | 3 | (Samoa) Census Johnston |
| HK | 2 | (France) William Servat | (yellow card) 51' to 62' |
| LP | 1 | (South Africa) Gurthrö Steenkamp | (substituted off) 76' |
Replacements:
| HK | 16 | (France) Christopher Tolofua | (substituted on) 53' (substituted off) 62' |
| PR | 17 | (South Africa) Daan Human | (substituted on) 76' |
| FL | 18 | (France) Yannick Nyanga | (substituted on) 68' |
| FL | 19 | (France) Grégory Lamboley | (substituted on) 76' |
| SH | 20 | (Australia) Luke Burgess | (substituted on) 50' |
| FH | 21 | (France) Lionel Beauxis | (substituted on) 70' |
| CE | 22 | (France) Yannick Jauzion | (substituted on) 61' |
| PR | 23 | (France) Yohan Montes |
| | Coach: (France) Guy Novès |

| FB | 15 | (France) Benjamin Lapeyre |
| RW | 14 | (France) Alexis Palisson |
| OC | 13 | (France) Mathieu Bastareaud |
| IC | 12 | (Australia) Matt Giteau |
| LW | 11 | (New Zealand) David Smith |
| FH | 10 | (England) Jonny Wilkinson |
| SH | 9 | (France) Sébastien Tillous-Borde |
| N8 | 8 | (Argentina) Juan Martín Fernández Lobbe |
| OF | 7 | (England) Steffon Armitage |
| BF | 6 | (South Africa) Joe van Niekerk (c) | (substituted off) 53' (substituted on) 62' (substituted off) 68' |
| RL | 5 | (England) Simon Shaw | (substituted off) 61' |
| LL | 4 | (South Africa) Bakkies Botha |
| TP | 3 | (Georgia (country)) Davit Kubriashvili | (yellow card) 63' to 73' (substituted off) 73' |
| HK | 2 | (France) Sébastien Bruno | (yellow card) 51' to 62' (substituted off) 70' |
| LP | 1 | (Wales) Eifion Lewis-Roberts | (substituted off) 74' |
Replacements:
| HK | 16 | (France) Mickaël Ivaldi | (substituted on) 53' (substituted off) 62' (substituted on) 70' |
| PR | 17 | (France) Laurent Emmanuelli | (substituted on) 74' |
| LK | 18 | (France) Christophe Samson | (substituted on) 61' |
| FL | 19 | (France) Pierrick Gunther | (substituted on) 68' (substituted off) 70' (substituted on) 73' |
| CE | 20 | (France) Geoffroy Messina |
| FB | 21 | (Australia) Luke Rooney |
| SH | 22 | (France) Fabien Cibray |
| PR | 23 | (Georgia (country)) Levan Chilachava | (substituted on) 70' |
| | Coach: (France) Bernard Laporte |

== Statistics ==
=== Top points scorers ===
Updated 19 May 2012

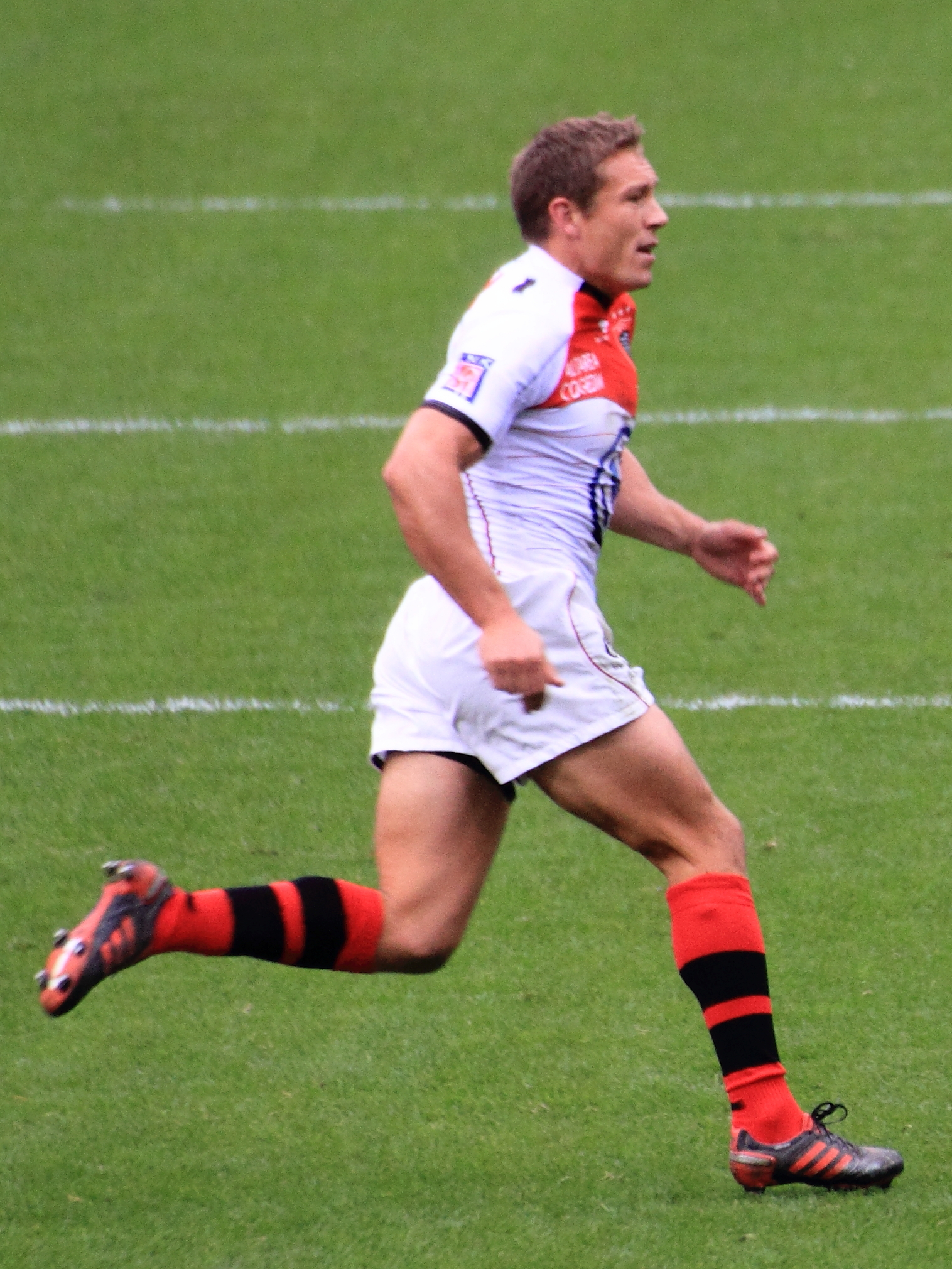
Jonny Wilkinson
(RC Toulon)

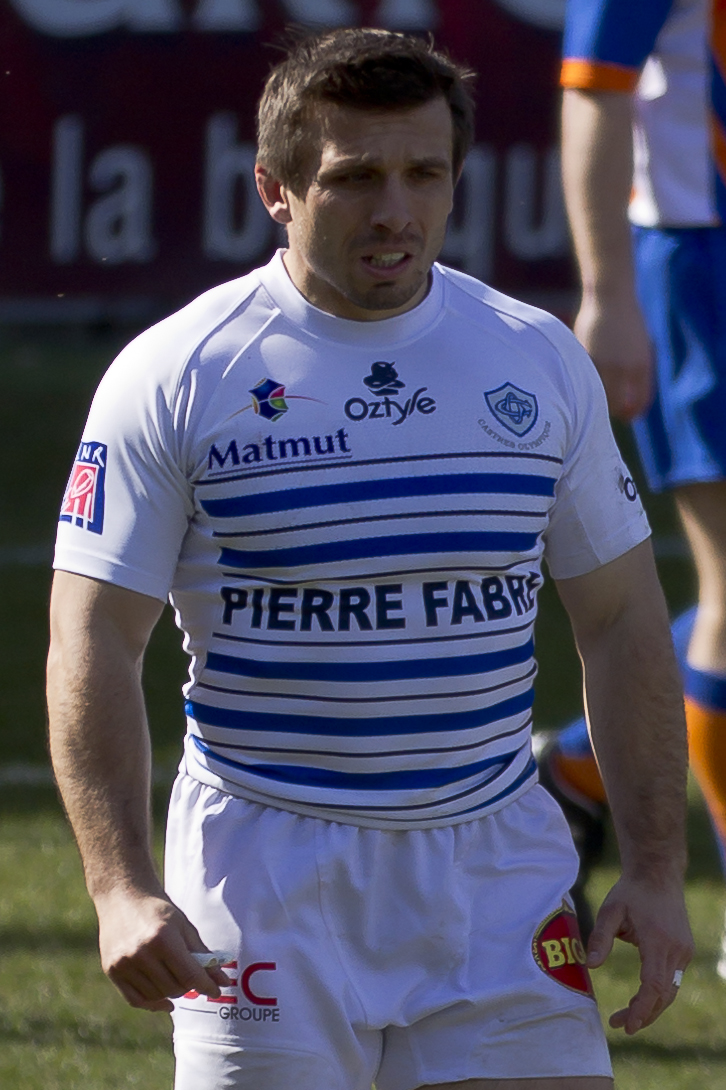
Romain Teulet
(Castres Olympique)

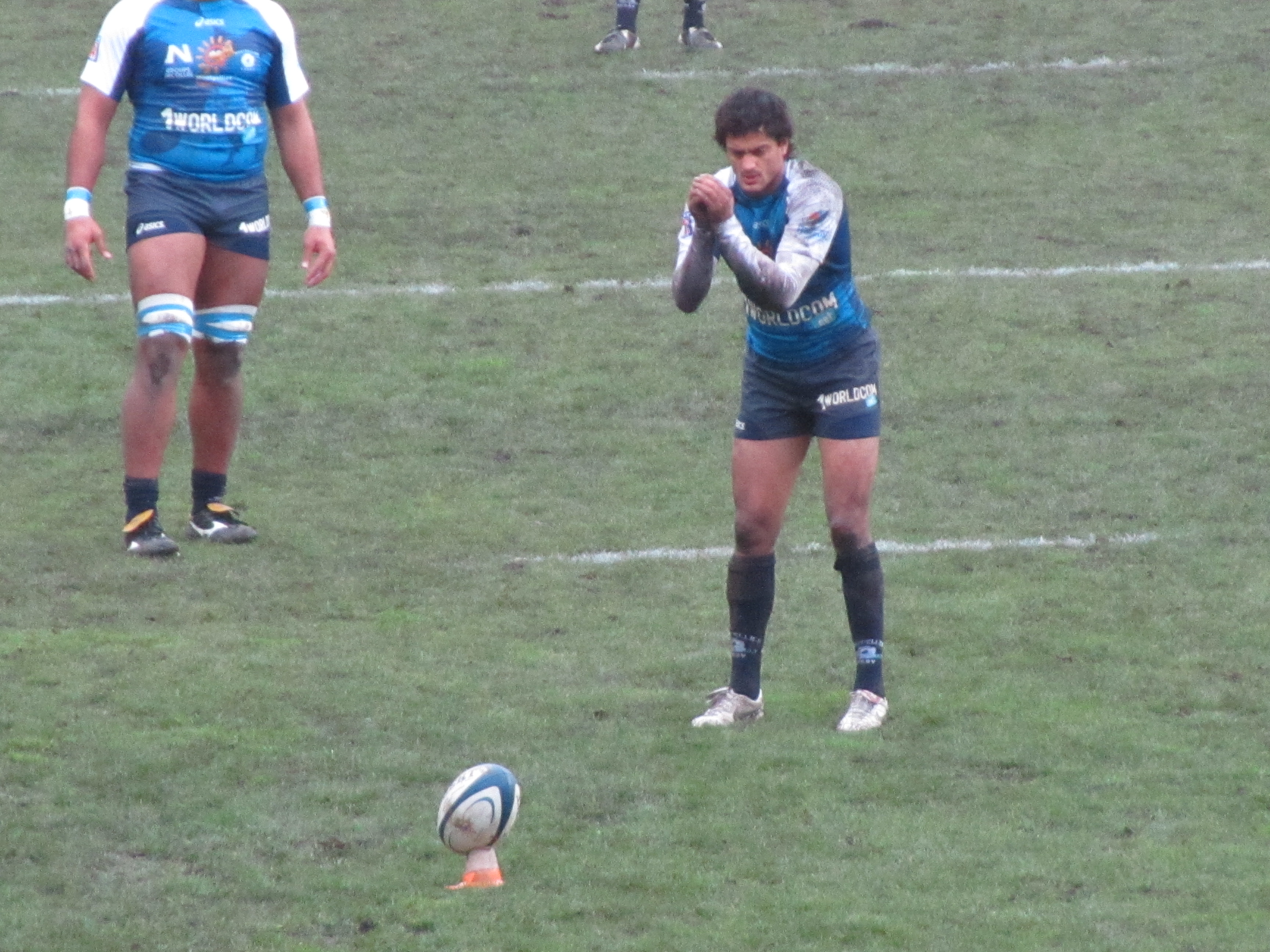
Martín Bustos Moyano
(Montpellier HR)

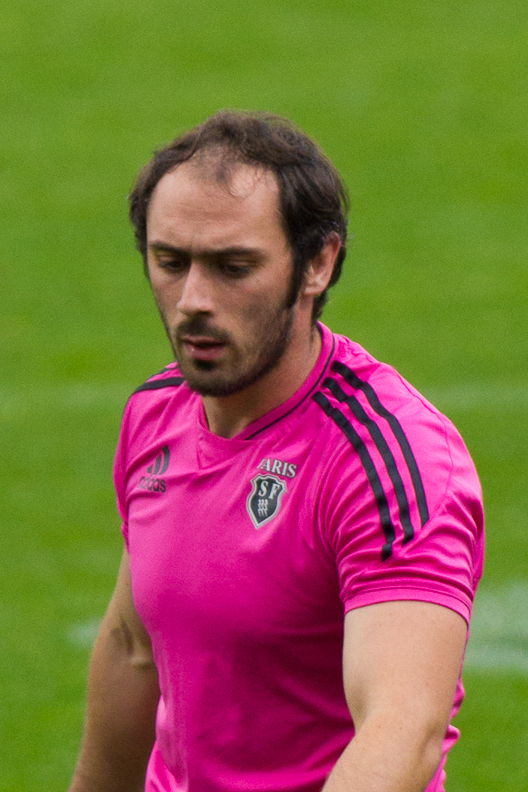
Julien Dupuy
(Stade Français)

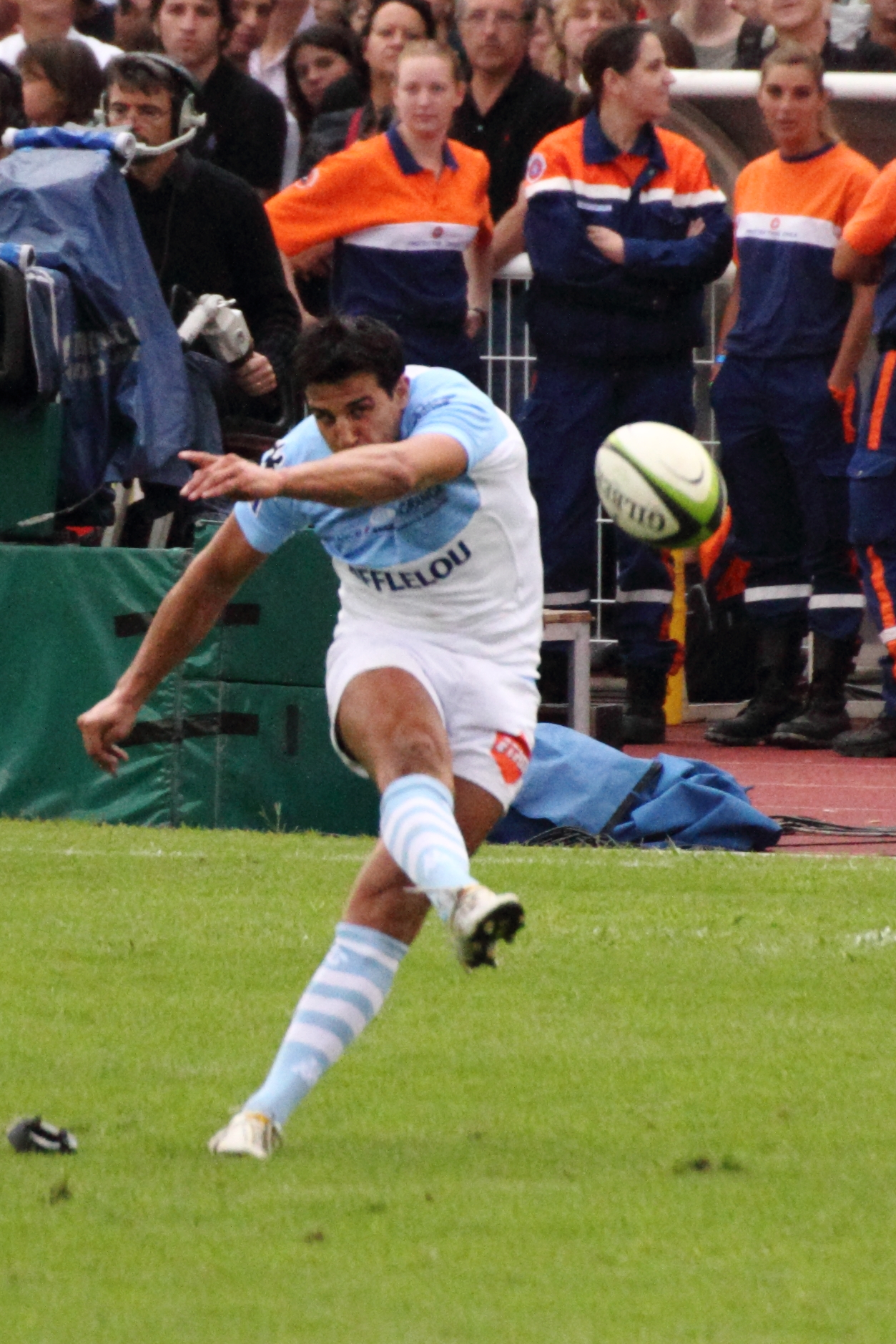
Benjamin Boyet
(Aviron Bayonnais)

Table of Top points scorers
| Rank | Player | Club | Points | Tries | Conversions | Penalties | Drop goals |
|---|---|---|---|---|---|---|---|
| 1 | Jonny Wilkinson | RC Toulon | 273 | 0 | 24 | 75 | 0 |
| 2 | Conrad Barnard | SU Agen | 267 | 0 | 15 | 75 | 4 |
| 3 | Romain Teulet | Castres Olympique | 249 | 0 | 30 | 62 | 1 |
| 4 | Martín Bustos Moyano | Montpellier HR | 213 | 3 | 27 | 48 | 0 |
| 5 | Julien Dupuy | Stade Français | 206 | 2 | 23 | 50 | 0 |
| 6 | Benjamin Boyet | Aviron Bayonnais | 202 | 2 | 12 | 55 | 1 |
| 7 | Lionel Beauxis | Stade Toulousain | 191 | 0 | 19 | 43 | 8 |
| 8 | Luke McAlister | Stade Toulousain | 191 | 3 | 22 | 44 | 0 |
| 9 | Brock James | USA Perpignan | 190 | 2 | 24 | 40 | 4 |
| 10 | Jonathan Wisniewski | Racing Métro 92 | 174 | 1 | 20 | 42 | 1 |

=== Top try scorers ===
Updated 6 May 2012

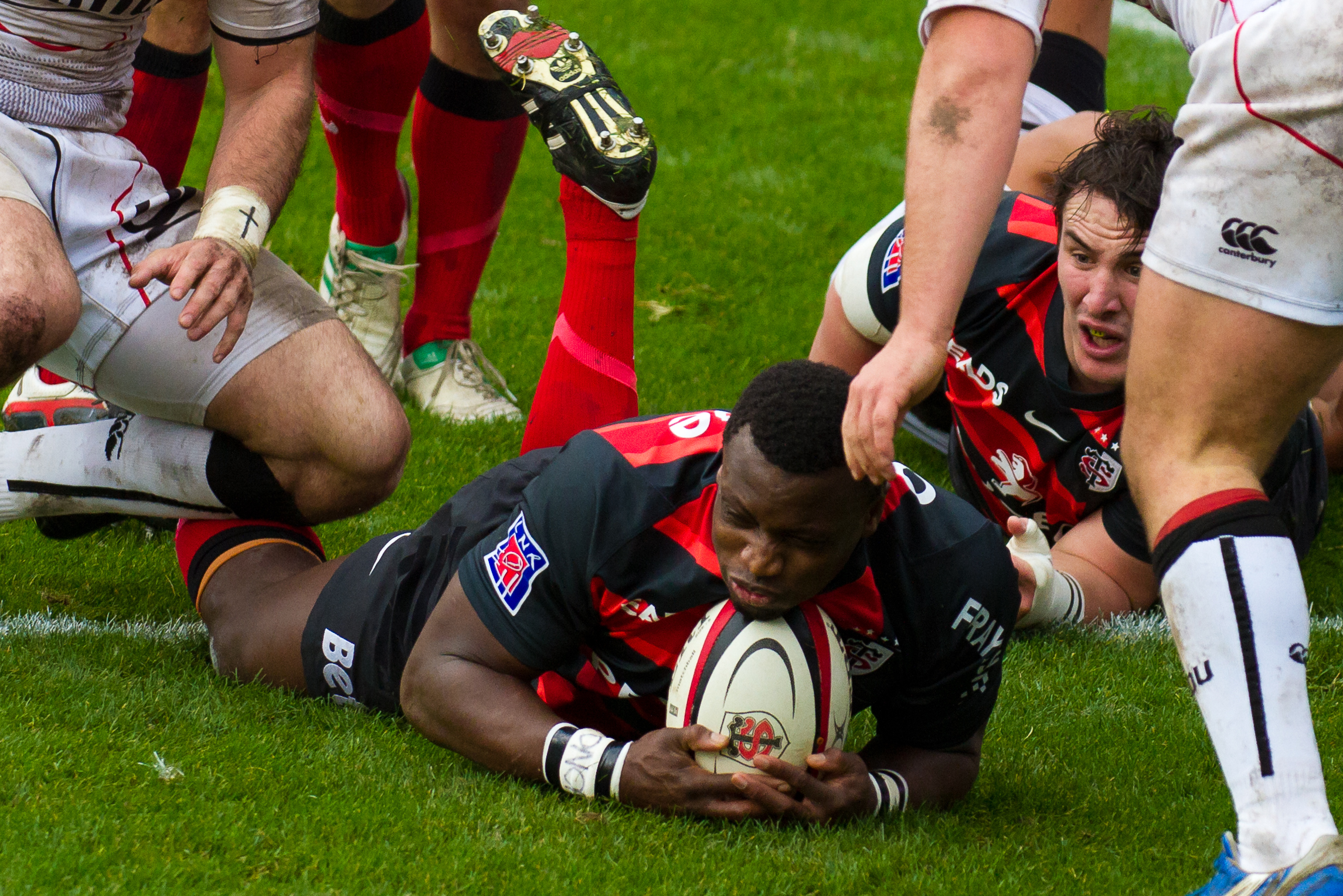
Yves Donguy
(Stade Toulousain)

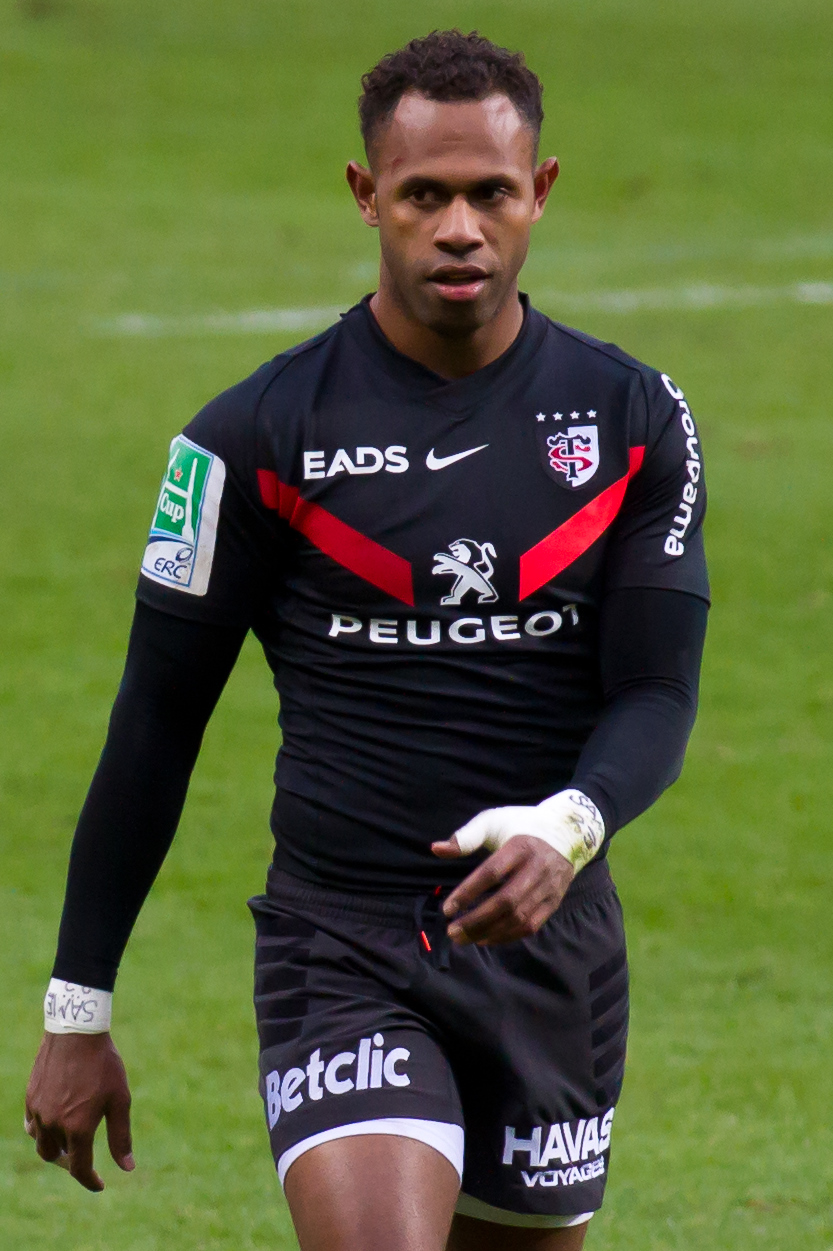
Timoci Matanavou
(Stade Toulousain)

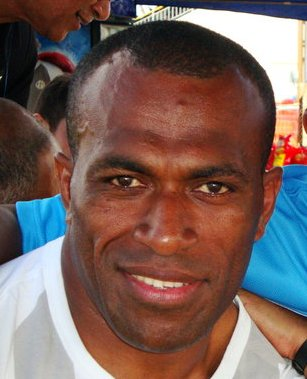
Sireli Bobo
(Racing Métro 92)

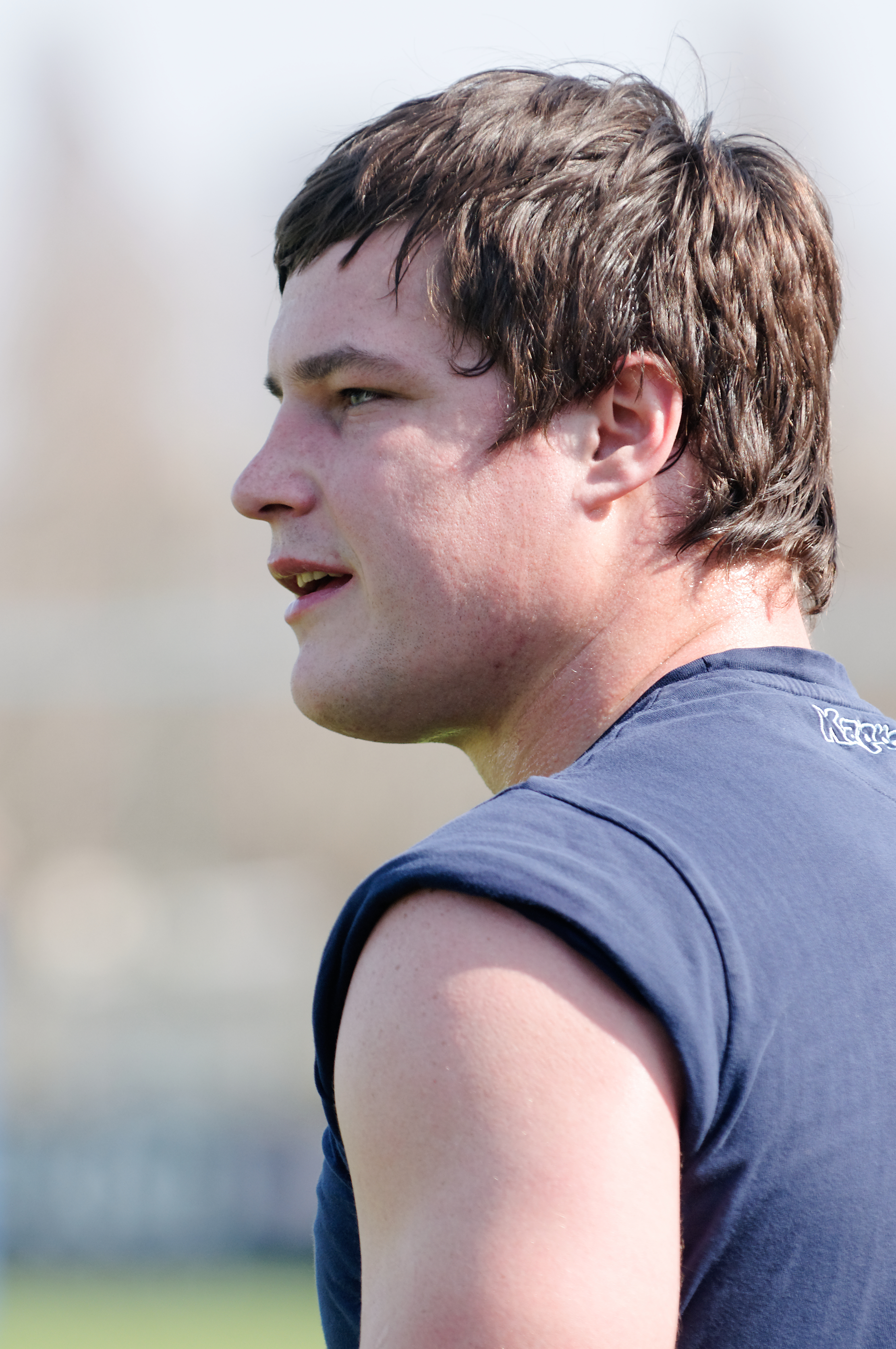
Henry Chavancy
(Racing Métro 92)

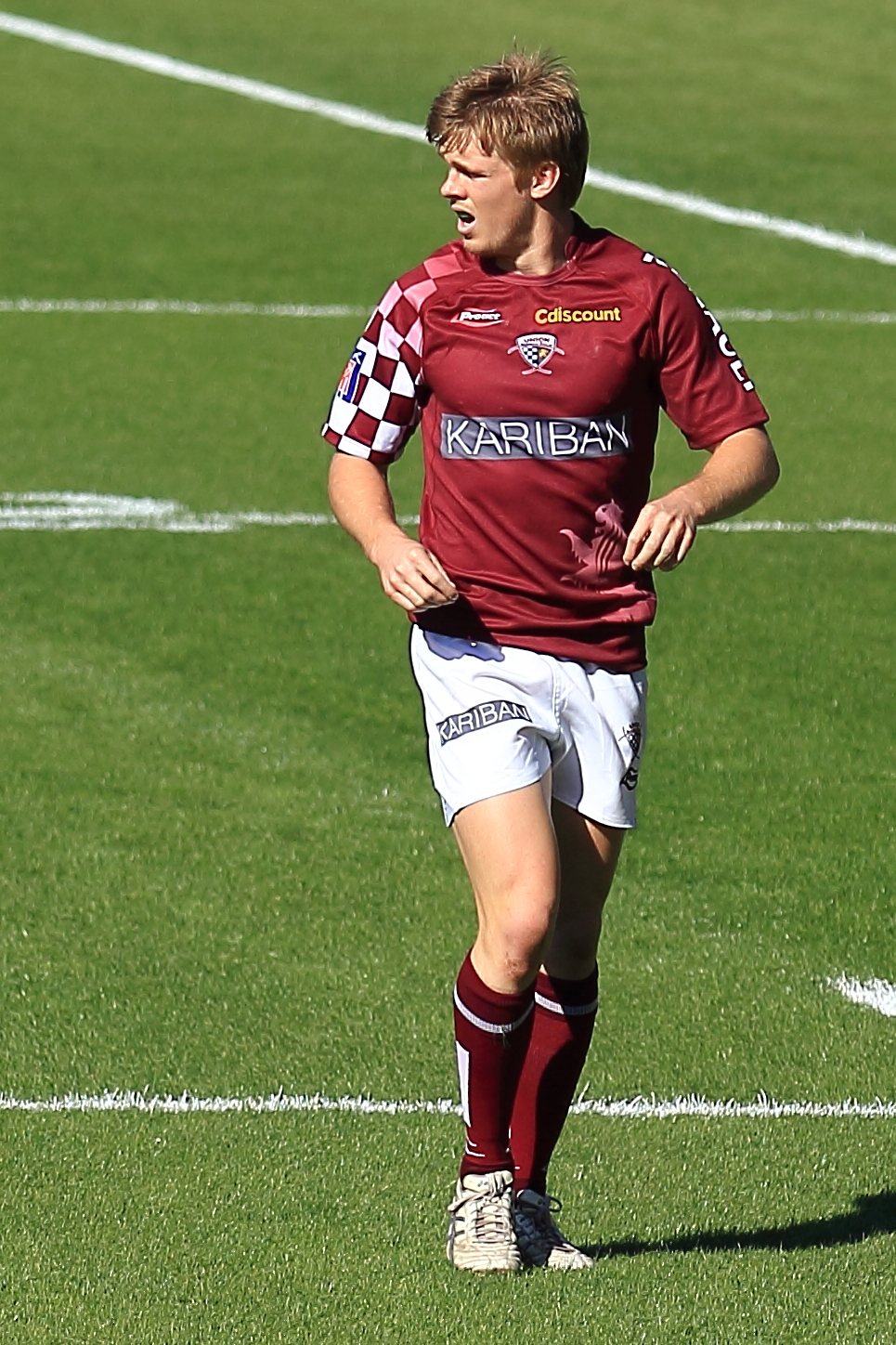
Blair Connor
(Bordeaux Bègles)

Table of Top try scorers
| Rank | Player | Club | Tries |
|---|---|---|---|
| 1 | Timoci Nagusa | Montpellier HR | 11 |
| 2 | Romain Martial | Castres Olympique | 10 |
| - | Yves Donguy | Stade Toulousain | 10 |
| - | Timoci Matanavou | Stade Toulousain | 10 |
| 5 | Alex Tulou | Montpellier HR | 8 |
| 6 | Lucas Amorosino | Montpellier HR | 7 |
| - | Sireli Bobo | Racing Métro 92 | 7 |
| - | Henry Chavancy | Racing Métro 92 | 7 |
| - | Blair Connor | Union Bordeaux Bègles | 7 |
| 10 | Marc Andreu | Castres Olympique | 6 |
| - | Steffon Armitage | RC Toulon | 6 |
| - | Jean-Marcellin Buttin | USA Perpignan | 6 |
| - | Damien Chouly | USA Perpignan | 6 |
| - | Rudi Coetzee | USA Perpignan | 6 |

== See also ==
- 2011–12 Rugby Pro D2 season
