= Galicia national rugby union team =

Galicia
- Nickname: O XV do Toxo (The Gorse XV)
- Emblem: Gorse flower
- Union: Galician Rugby Federation (Galician: Federación Galega de Rugby)
- Head coach: Carlos Bernardos Vallejo; Evaristo Martínez Barallobre
- Home stadium: Manuel Anxo Cortizo
| First colours | Second colours |

First international
- (Galicia (Spain)) Galicia – Portugal (Santiago de Compostela, 1999)

Biggest win
- (Navarre) Navarra 5 – 45 (Galicia (Spain)) Galicia (17 December 2006)

Biggest defeat
- (Basque Country (autonomous community)) Basque Country 59 – 0 (Galicia (Spain)) Galicia (21 December 2003)
- Website: www.rugby.gal

The Galicia rugby union team is the national and/or representative rugby union team of Galicia. It is organised by the Galician Rugby Federation and has been active since 1999. In 1999 they made their international against Portugal.

== Matches ==
Galicia rugby union team matches:

| Data | Lugar | Equipo local | Equipo visitante | Resultado |
|---|---|---|---|---|
| 12-10-2003 | Santa Isabel, Santiago de Compostela | (Galicia (Spain)) Galicia | Catalonia | 20 – 26 |
| 21-12-2003 | | (Basque Country (autonomous community)) Basque Country | (Galicia (Spain)) Galicia | 59 – 0 |
| 10-10-2004 | La Foixarda, Barcelona | Catalonia | (Galicia (Spain)) Galicia | 23 – 3 |
| 18-12-2004 | As Lagoas, Vigo | (Galicia (Spain)) Galicia | (Basque Country (autonomous community)) Basque Country | 6 – 65 |
| 16-01-2005 | Campos de Pepe Rojo, Valladolid | (Galicia (Spain)) Galicia | Asturias | 26 – 22 |
| 29-10-2005 | Acea de Ama, Culleredo | (Galicia (Spain)) Galicia | (Navarre) Navarra | 7 – 0 |
| 07-10-2006 | Manuel Anxo Cortizo, Lalín | (Galicia (Spain)) Galicia | Bearn | 8 – 26 |
| 27-11-2005 | UNBE, Éibar | (Basque Country (autonomous community)) Basque Country | (Galicia (Spain)) Galicia | 51 – 0 |
| 04-11-2006 | Antoine Béguère, Lourdes | Armagnac-Bigorre | (Galicia (Spain)) Galicia | 43 – 8 |
| 25-11-2006 | Acea de Ama, Culleredo | (Galicia (Spain)) Galicia | (Basque Country (autonomous community)) Basque Country | 5 – 37 |
| 17-12-2006 | University Field, Pamplona | (Navarre) Navarra | (Galicia (Spain)) Galicia | 5 – 45 |
| 13-01-2007 | Las Mestas, Xixón | (Galicia (Spain)) Galicia | Castile and León | 25 – 26 |
| 22-09-2007 | Estadio Universitario, Vigo | (Galicia (Spain)) Galicia | (Valencian Community) Valencia | 24 – 29 |
| 29-09-2007 | Plaiaundi, Irún | (Basque Country (autonomous community)) Basque Country | (Galicia (Spain)) Galicia | 35 – 7 |
| 22-12-2007 | Manuel Anxo Cortizo, Lalín | (Galicia (Spain)) Galicia | Armagnac-Bigorre | 22 – 51 |
| 16-12-2007 | Santa Bárbara, Avilés | (Galicia (Spain)) Galicia | Castile and León | 9 – 10 |

== See also ==
- Rugby union in Spain
