= 2003 Heineken Cup final =

2003 Heineken Cup Final
- Event: 2002–03 Heineken Cup
Toulouse	Perpignan
22	17
- Date: 24 May 2003
- Venue: Lansdowne Road, Dublin
- Referee: Chris White (England); Tony Spreadbury (England)
- Attendance: 28,600

The 2003 Heineken Cup Final was the final match of the 2002–03 Heineken Cup, the eighth season of Europe's top club rugby union competition. The match was played on 24 May 2003 at Lansdowne Road in Dublin. The match was contested by Toulouse and Perpignan. Toulouse became the second team to win the competition more than once, winning the match 22–17.

It was the first all-French Heineken Cup Final, and the first all-national Heineken Cup Final in the competitions history.

== Match details ==
24 May 2003
15:00 WEST

Toulouse	22–17	Perpignan
Try: Clerc 33' c Con: Delaigue; Pen: Delaigue (5) 3', 18', 27', 40', 80+1'	Report	Try: Bomati 80+4' m Pen: Edmonds (4) 44', 51', 57', 70'

Lansdowne Road, Dublin
Attendance: 28,600
Referee: Chris White (England) (Note: Referee Chris White was replaced by Tony Spreadbury in the twelfth minute of the match.)

Toulouse	Perpignan

FB	15	Clément Poitrenaud
RW	14	Émile Ntamack
OC	13	Xavier Garbajosa
IC	12	Yannick Jauzion
LW	11	Vincent Clerc
FH	10	Yann Delaigue
SH	9	Frédéric Michalak
N8	8	Christian Labit
OF	7	Trevor Brennan
BF	6	Jean Bouilhou
RL	5	Fabien Pelous (c)
LL	4	David Gérard
TP	3	Jean-Baptiste Poux
HK	2	Yannick Bru
LP	1	Benoît Lecouls
Substitutions:
HK	16	William Servat
PR	17	Cédric Soulette
FL	18	Finau Maka
LK	19	Grégory Lamboley
SH	20	Sylvain Dupuy
WG	21	Cédric Heymans
CE	22	Cédric Desbrosse
Coach:
Guy Novès

FB	15	Jean-Marc Souverbie
RW	14	Pascal Bomati
OC	13	Pascal Giordani
IC	12	Christophe Manas
LW	11	Frédéric Cermeno
FH	10	Manuel Edmonds
SH	9	Ludovic Loustau
N8	8	Phil Murphy
OF	7	Bernard Goutta (c)
BF	6	Grégory Le Corvec
RL	5	Rimas Álvarez-Kairelis
LL	4	Jérôme Thion
TP	3	Nicolas Mas
HK	2	Michel Konieck
LP	1	Renaud Peillard
Substitutions:
HK	16	Marc Dal Maso
PR	17	Stéphane de Bésombes
N8	18	Lionel Mallier
LK	19	Christophe Porcu
SH	20	Jacques Basset
FH	21	Nicolas Laharrague
CE	22	David Marty
Coach:
Olivier Saïsset

== See also ==
- 2002–03 Heineken Cup
