= Basque Country women's national rugby union team =

Basque Country
- Union: Basque Rugby Federation; Euskadiko Errugbi Federakundea
- Head coach: José Miguel Galdós
- Website: www.euskadirugby.org

Basque Country women's national rugby union team (Basque: Euskadiko emakumeen selekzioa) is the national and/or representative women's rugby union team of the Basque Country. It is organised by the Basque Rugby Federation and has been active since 1994–95. Unlike the men's team, the Basque Country women's team have only played a small number of international games. They regularly play friendlies against club and provincial teams.

== History ==
=== Competitions ===
Since 1994–95 the Basque Country women's team have competed in the Spanish Regions Championship featuring other women's teams representing the autonomous communities of Spain. This competition is organised by the Spanish Rugby Federation. Since 2006–07 they have also competed in the Pyrenees International Tournament.

=== List of results ===
Date	Home	Score	Away	Venue
30 September 1995	Côte Basque Landes	10–17	(Basque Country (autonomous community)) Basque Country	
1995–96	US Herms	19–10	(Basque Country (autonomous community)) Basque Country	Zarautz
1996–97	Armagnac Bigorre	5–44	(Basque Country (autonomous community)) Basque Country	
1996–97	France A	0–32	(Basque Country (autonomous community)) Basque Country	
1996–97	Périgord Agenais	0–25	(Basque Country (autonomous community)) Basque Country	
1997–98	US Herms	30–0	(Basque Country (autonomous community)) Basque Country	
1997–98	Aquitaine B	0–10	(Basque Country (autonomous community)) Basque Country	
1997–98	Armagnac Bigorre	7–47	(Basque Country (autonomous community)) Basque Country	
1998–99	US Herms	53–12	(Basque Country (autonomous community)) Basque Country	
1998–99	(Basque Country (autonomous community)) Basque Country	65–15	Armagnac Bigorre	
1999–2000	(Basque Country (autonomous community)) Basque Country	34–0	US Herms	
2000–01	Les Pachys d'Herm	12–5	(Basque Country (autonomous community)) Basque Country	
2000–01	(Basque Country (autonomous community)) Basque Country	15–20	(United Kingdom) British Police XV	
2000–01	(Basque Country (autonomous community)) Basque Country	86–0	Aragon	
2001–02	(Basque Country (autonomous community)) Basque Country	5–5	Navarre	
2001–02	Les Pachys d'Herm	20–19	(Basque Country (autonomous community)) Basque Country	
2001–02	(Basque Country (autonomous community)) Basque Country	3–0	Madrid	^{[Note 1]}
2002–03	Madrid	10–5	(Basque Country (autonomous community)) Basque Country	^{[Note 1]}
2003–04	Catalonia	10–5	(Basque Country (autonomous community)) Basque Country	^{[Note 1]}
2004–05	(Basque Country (autonomous community)) Basque Country	10–0	AS Bayonne	
2005–06	(Basque Country (autonomous community)) Basque Country	28–0	(Galicia (Spain)) Galicia	^{[Note 1]}
2005–06	France Universities	32–5	(Basque Country (autonomous community)) Basque Country	
2005–06	(Basque Country (autonomous community)) Basque Country	5–54	Spain	
2005–06	(Basque Country (autonomous community)) Basque Country	46–5	Navarre	
9 September 2006	(France) Béarn	15–0	(Basque Country (autonomous community)) Basque Country	Lagor
29 September 2007	(Basque Country (autonomous community)) Basque Country	7–17	AS Bayonne	Menditte
31 May 2008	France Universities	37–0	(Basque Country (autonomous community)) Basque Country	Bayonne
2007–08	(Basque Country (autonomous community)) Basque Country	25–15	Madrid	^{[Note 1]}
13 September 2008	(Basque Country (autonomous community)) Basque Country	5–31	L.A.R.G.E.	Salies-de-Béarn
14 March 2010	Catalonia	12–17	(Basque Country (autonomous community)) Basque Country	Lleida ^{[Note 2]}
2009–10	(Basque Country (autonomous community)) Basque Country	15–10	Madrid	^{[Note 1]}
12 December 2010	(Basque Country (autonomous community)) Basque Country	15–22	Catalonia	Durango, Biscay ^{[Note 2]}
2010–11	Madrid	27–7	(Basque Country (autonomous community)) Basque Country	^{[Note 1]}
6 February 2016	(Basque Country (autonomous community)) Basque Country	5–42	France U20	Hernani, Gipuzkoa
10 September 2016	(Basque Country (autonomous community)) Basque Country	0–116	Spain	Gamarra, Vitoria-Gasteiz

Notes

- ^1 Spanish Regions Championship final
- ^2 Pyrenees International Tournament final

== Honours ==
- Spanish Regions Championship
  - Winners: 2001–02, 2005–06, 2007–08, 2008–09, 2009–10: 5
  - Runners-up: 2002–03, 2003–04, 2010–11: 3
- Pyrenees International Tournament
  - Winners: 2008–09, 2009–10: 2
  - Runners-up: 2006–07, 2010–11 : 2

== Players ==
=== 2016 squad ===
Squad called up for the friendly match against France U20 on 6 February 2016.

Head coach: José Miguel Galdós

Euskadi XV
Hookers: Sabina Argagnon (AS Bayonnais); Ilargi Díaz (Gaztedi RT); Props: Ingrid Amigoren (AS Bayonnais); Patricia Carricaburu (Lons RF); Amaya Gonzalez (AS Bayonne); Magali Haiçaguerre (AS Bayonnais); Maite Irigoien (La Única RT); Maika Irizoz (La Única RT); Irati Ormazabal (Hernani CRE); Ane Puerta (Hernani CRE); Cristina Guntin (AS Bayonnais); Locks: Maika Brust (AS Bayonnais); Lea Etxebarrieta (Hernani CRE); Laura Ruiz de Erentxun (La Única RT); Marina Vargas (Eibar RT)	Flankers: Lide Elgezabal (Durango RT); Leire Ruiz (Gaztedi RT); Maitane Salinas (La Única RT); Numbers 8: Nora Solano (Hernani CRE); Scrum-halves: Maddi Braco (La Única RT); Anne Fernández (Gaztedi RT); Marie Menanteau (AS Bayonnais); Fly-halves: Popolle Boudon (AS Bayonnais); Aitana Pérez (Gaztedi RT)	Centres: Uribarri Barrutieta (Durango RT); Ainhoa Belekortu (Gaztedi RT); Céline Héguy (AS Bayonne); Laura Lorenzo (Hernani CRE); Wings: Enara Cacho (AS Bayonnais); Melanie Cenderet (AS Bayonnais); Miren Echezarreta (Gaztedi RT); Ana Mariñelarina (La Única RT); Irene Reyes (La Única RT); Fullbacks: Anabel Pérez (Hernani CRE); Joana Murray (Durango RT); Noelia Telletxea (La Única RT)

=== France internationals ===
- Carla Arbez
- Lise Arricastre
- Ana Ayerra
- Camille Cabalou
- Patricia Carricaburu
- Céline Ferer
- Céline Héguy
- Danièle Irazu
- Sandrine Jauregiberri
- Maya Lespielle
- Julie Pujol

=== Spain internationals ===
- Karitte Alegria
- Arantxa Arana
- Beatriz Baraia-Etxaburu
- Eider Barrena
- Iona Barrena
- Uribarri Barrutieta
- Maika Brust
- Enara Cacho
- Amets Castrejana
- Itziar Diez Murga
- Amaia Erbina
- Lide Erbina
- Rosanna Estanyol
- Victoriano Esnaola
- Inés Etxegibel
- Amaya Fernández
- Anne Fernández
- Olatz Fernández de Arroyabe
- Eider García
- Irene Heras
- Saioa Jaurena
- Angelina Masdeu
- Idoia Olaberria
- Agurtzane Orbegozo
- Nerea Otxoa de Aspuru
- Ana Isabel de la Parte
- Aitziber Porras
- Isabel Rodríguez
- Idoia Salazar
- Itsaso Salazar
- Maitane Salinas
- Estibaliz Uriarte

== See also ==
- Basque Country national rugby union team
- France women's national rugby union team
- Spain women's national rugby union team
