= Spanish Regions Championship (rugby union) =

- Sport: Rugby union
- Instituted: 1983; 42 years ago
- Country: Spain
- Most titles: Basque Country (14 titles)

The Spanish Regions Championship (Spanish:Campeonato de Selecciones Territoriales) is a rugby union competition in Spain featuring the representative teams of the autonomous communities. The competition is organised by the Spanish Rugby Federation. The Basque Country were the inaugural winners in 1983–84. They are also the competitions most successful team. The competition is usually played as a knockout tournament. However it has occasionally adopted a league system.

== Finals ==
Season	Date	Home	Score	Away	Venue
1983–84	26 February 1984	Basque Country	24–12	Catalonia	
1984–85	3 March 1985	Basque Country	25–4	Catalonia	
1985–86	18 May 1986	(Community of Madrid) Madrid	13–12	Catalonia	
1986–87		(Community of Madrid) Madrid	?		
1987–88	5 June 1988	Catalonia	16–9	Basque Country	
1988–89	28 May 1989	Catalonia	21–20	(Castile and León) Castile-León	
1989–90	8 June 1990	(Castile and León) Castile-León	20–16	Catalonia	
1990–91	19 May 1991	Catalonia	19–16	(Castile and León) Castile-León	
1991–92		Catalonia	^{[Note 1]}		
1992–93		(Castile and León) Castile-León	^{[Note 1]}		
1993–94		Basque Country	28–10	Catalonia	
1994–95					
1995–96	19 Nov 1995	Basque Country	25–17	Catalonia	
1996–97	3 Nov 1996	Basque Country	37–14	Catalonia	Guernica
1997–98	7 December 1997	Basque Country	29–8	Catalonia	Tudela, Navarre
1999–2000	5 December 1999	Catalonia	10–9	Andalusia	Camp de la Foixarda
2000–01		Andalusia	16–13	Basque Country	
2001–02		(Castile and León) Castile-León	12–11	Basque Country	
2002–03		Basque Country	8–7	(Castile and León) Castile-León	
2003–04		Basque Country	^{[Note 2]}	(Castile and León) Castile-León	
2004–05		Basque Country	28–20	Andalusia	
2005–06		Basque Country	^{[Note 3]}	Andalusia	
2006–07		Basque Country	21–19	Andalusia	
2007–08		(Community of Madrid) Madrid	35–32	(Valencian Community) Valencia	
2008–09		Basque Country	19–12	Andalusia	
2009–10		Andalusia	22–16	(Community of Madrid) Madrid	
2010–11		Basque Country	24–6	(Castile and León) Castile-León	
2011–12		(Community of Madrid) Madrid	^{[Note 1]}		

Notes

- ^1 No final. League system used.
- ^2 Basque Country won Group A. Castile-León won Group B
- ^3 Basque Country won Group A. Andalusia won Group B

== List of winners by team ==
Club	Titles	Seasons
Basque Country	14	1983–84, 1984–85, 1993–94, 1995–96, 1996–97, 1997–98, 1998–99, 2002–03, 2003–04, 2004–05, 2005–06, 2006–07, 2008–09, 2010–11
Catalonia	5	1987–88, 1988–89, 1990–91, 1991–92, 1999–2000
(Community of Madrid) Madrid	4	1985–86, 1986–87, 2007–08, 2011–12
(Castile and León) Castile-León	3	1989–90, 1992–93, 2001–02
Andalusia	2	2000–01, 2009–10
