= Rudi Coetzee =

South African rugby union player

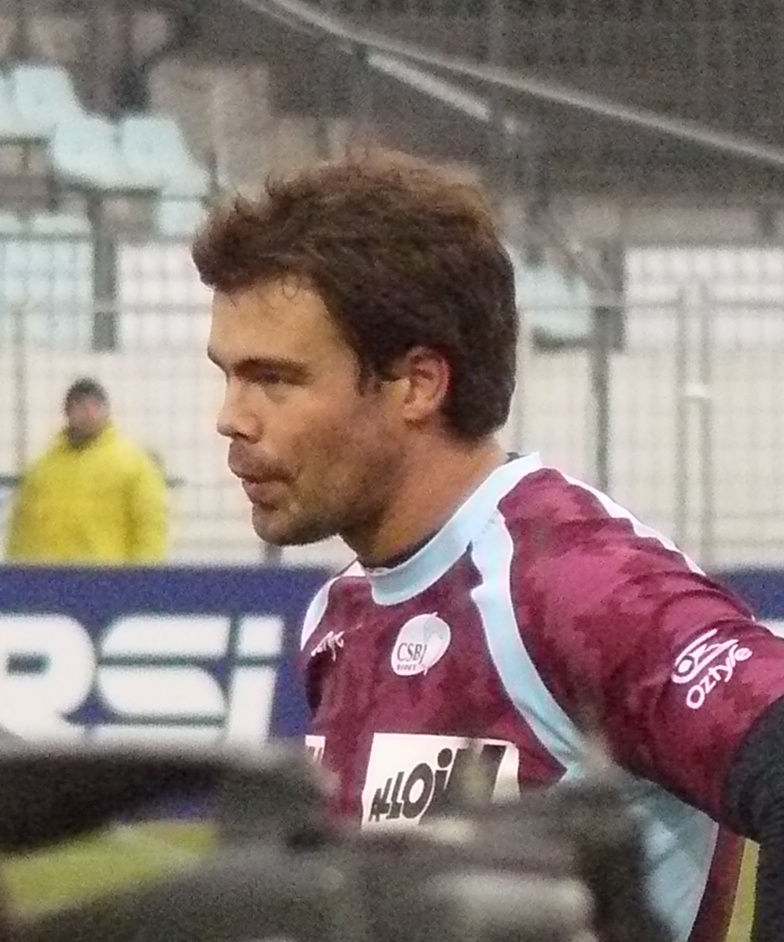
- Born: 16 April 1981 (age 45) Port Elizabeth, South Africa
- Height: 1.96 m (6 ft 5 in)
- Weight: 100 kg (15 st 10 lb)

Rugby union career
- Position: Centre
Senior career
Years	Team	Apps	(Points)
2006–2011	CS Bourgoin-Jallieu	77	(50)
2011–2012	USA Perpignan	25	(50)
2012–2014	FC Grenoble	2	(5)
- Correct as of 14 November 2012
Provincial / State sides
Years	Team	Apps	(Points)
2005	Golden Lions	6	(5)
Super Rugby
Years	Team	Apps	(Points)
2002–2005	Lions	12	(10)
2006	Bulls	2	(0)

Rudi Coetzee (born 16 April 1981) is a South African rugby union player. His position is centre and he currently plays for FC Grenoble in the Top 14.

== Career ==
He began his career with Lions in his native South Africa before moving to CS Bourgoin-Jallieu in 2006. He played with Bourgoin until January 2011. He joined USA Perpignan in January 2011, scoring six tries in the following season, before moving to newly promoted Grenoble in the summer of 2012. He would retire from professional rugby in 2014.

After retiring from professional rugby, he began studying at Nelson Mandela University in Gqeberha to pursue his Bachelor of Science Undergraduate Degree in Quantity Surveying (2015-2017).
