= Osamu Ota =

Japan international rugby union player

- Born: March 23, 1965 (age 61) Akita, Akita Prefecture

Rugby union career
- Position: Prop
Amateur team(s)
Years	Team	Apps	(Points)
- Meiji University RFC
Senior career
Years	Team	Apps	(Points)
1987-1999	NEC		
International career
Years	Team	Apps	(Points)
1986-1995	Japan	27	(5)
Coaching career
- Years: Team
- 2006-2007: Japan

Osamu Ota (太田 治, Ota Osamu) (born 23 March 1965, in Akita) is a former Japanese rugby union player and a coach. He played as a prop.

== Career ==
Ota had 27 caps for Japan, from 1986 to 1995, scoring a try, 5 points in aggregate. He played twice at the Rugby World Cup, being a totalist in the 1991 Rugby World Cup, with three games, and at the 1995 Rugby World Cup, again with three games played. That was the last time he played for the National Team.

Ota, after finishing his player career, become a coach. He was coach of NEC. He was general manager of Japan Rugby Football Union when he took charge as caretaker head coach of the "Brave Blossoms", in September 2006, after the sacking of Jean-Pierre Élissalde. He announced that the new head coach of Japan would be John Kirwan, in October, remaining in office until 1 January 2007.

Sporting positions
Preceded by (France) Jean-Pierre Élissalde	Japan national rugby union team coach (caretaker); 2006	Succeeded by (New Zealand) John Kirwan
