= Pascal Giordani =

France international rugby union player (born 1974)

- Born: 1 June 1974 (age 52) Belfort, France
- Height: 5 ft 11 in (180 cm)
- Weight: 182 lb (83 kg)

Rugby union career
- Position: Centre
International career
| Years | Team | Apps | (Points) |
| 1999 | France | 2 | (0) |

Pascal Giordani (born 1 June 1974) is a French former professional rugby union player.

Born in Belfort, Giordani was a centre, schooled in rugby at RC Trignacais.

Giordani started his career at US Dax and during his time at the club gained two caps for France, against England and Scotland in the 1999 Five Nations Championship. He moved to USA Perpignan in 2001 and played in the team which lost the 2003 Heineken Cup final to Toulouse. From 2004 to 2006, he played for CA Brive.

== See also ==
- List of France national rugby union players
