= Jean-Pierre Élissalde =

French rugby union player (born 1953)

- Born: 31 December 1953 (age 72) La Rochelle, France
- Height: 174 cm (5 ft 9 in)
- Weight: 78 kg (12 st 4 lb)
- Notable relative: Jean-Baptiste Élissalde (son)

Rugby union career
- Position: Scrum-half
Senior career
| Years | Team | Apps | (Points) |
| 1973-1978 | La Rochelle | | |
| 1978-1980 | Bayonne | | |
| 1980-1988 | La Rochelle | | |
International career
| Years | Team | Apps | (Points) |
| 1980-1981 | France | 5 | (0) |
| 1983-1986 | Barbarian RC | 3 | (5) |
Coaching career
- Years: Team
- 1988-1993: La Rochelle
- 1994-2003: La Rochelle
- 2003-2005: Béziers
- 2005-2006: Japan
- 2006-2008: Bayonne
- 2011-2012: Bayonne
- 2015: Basque Country

Jean-Pierre Élissalde (born 31 December 1953) is a rugby union coach and former player.

== Playing career ==
Élissalde began his career with his local team La Rochelle. He went on to play for Bayonne for two years between 1978 and 1980 before returning to his old club where he finished his career in 1988. He won 5 caps for the France national rugby union team between 1980 and 1981.

== Coaching career ==
He became coach of La Rochelle immediately after retiring and remained there for five years. After a few months hiatus, he returned to the job in 1994 and stayed there for nine further years and finished his time there winning the penultimate Challenge Yves du Manoir in 2003.

After leaving La Rochelle, he joined Béziers but he was sacked in 2005 after less than two years in charge as they were relegated from the Top 16.

Soon after leaving Béziers, in March 2005 he became backs coach to the Japan national rugby union team, and three months later after Mitsutake Hagimoto was sacked he was appointed the first ever foreigner to coach Japan, and was backed to lead them to the 2007 Rugby World Cup.

After just over a year in charge, he was sacked in September 2006 after he took on a role with Bayonne without consulting the JFRU and then refused to give up his role to concentrate on coaching Japan. Élissalde went on to spend two seasons with Bayonne before being sacked in 2008.

In December 2011, after Bayonne were languishing at the bottom of the Top 14 they sacked their coaches and Élissalde returned to Bayonne. However he was sacked after just 40 days in charge after Bayonne continued to struggle and failed to win a game under him in the Top 14, and as he left he was criticised by the Bayonne owner Alain Affleou who said "Élissalde was a mistake, he had a negative attitude towards the players".

== Notes ==
Jean-Pierre Élissalde's father Arnaud Élissalde was also a previous player and coach of La Rochelle between 1947 and 1971. His father-in-law Laurent Bidart also played for La Rochelle and won 1 cap for France in 1953. His son Jean-Baptiste Élissalde became the third generation of the family to play for La Rochelle when he made his debut in 1997, and also like his father went on to become a third generation French international winning 35 caps between 2000 and 2008.

In March 2013, Élissalde admitted to having used amphetamines on two occasions during his playing career. While he indicated that doping was widespread during that era, he noted that in his experience as a player and coach, doping was exclusively an individual affair and not conducted on a team level.

Sporting positions
| Preceded by (Japan) Mitsutake Hagimoto | Japan National Rugby Union Coach; 2005–2006 | Succeeded by (Japan) Osamu Ota (caretaker) |
