= Stéphane de Bésombes =

French rugby union player (born 1972)

- Full name: Stéphane de Bésombes-Singla
- Born: 2 January 1972 (age 54) Perpignan, France
- Height: 5 ft 11 in (180 cm)
- Weight: 252 lb (114 kg)

Rugby union career
- Position: Prop
International career
Years	Team	Apps	(Points)
1998	France	2	(0)

Stéphane de Bésombes-Singla (born 2 January 1972) is a French former professional rugby union player.

Born in Perpignan, de Bésombes is the son of a former long-serving L'Albère mayor. He played as a prop and spent most of his rugby career with USA Perpignan, from where he gained his two French caps, against Argentina and Fiji in away Tests in 1998, both off the bench. In 2003, he played on the USA Perpignan team beaten by Stade Toulousain in the Heineken Cup final. He finished his career with a stint at Castres Olympique.

== See also ==
- List of France national rugby union players
