= Rugby union in Catalonia =

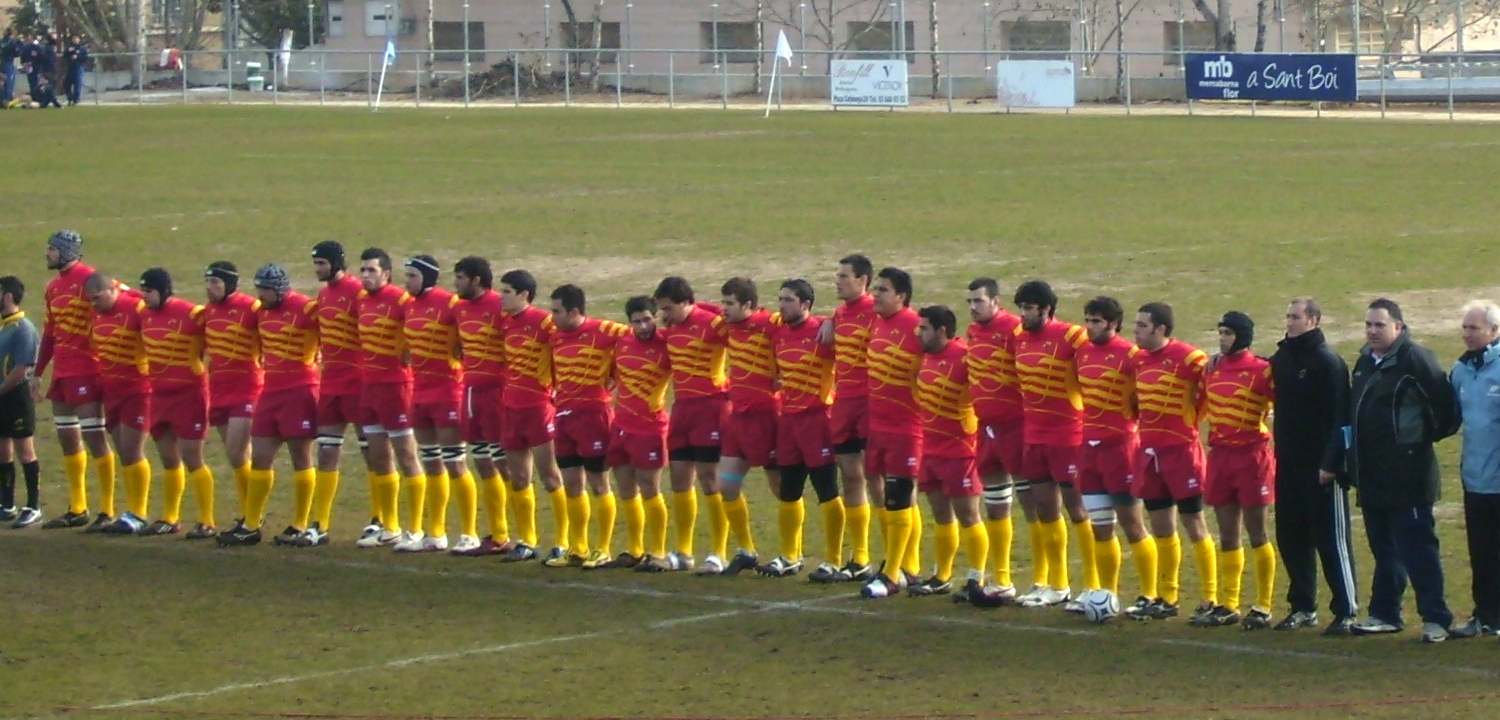
Catalan national rugby union side vs Sweden

Rugby union is a small but popular field sport in Catalonia. The game is most popular in the North near the French border.

== History ==
Rugby union was introduced in Southern Catalonia in 1921, when Baldiri Aleu i Torres founded the Unió Esportiva Santboiana. In 1922 the Catalan Rugby Federation was founded, which was one of the founding members of the Paris-based FIRA – Association of European Rugby, from which it was expelled at the behest of Franco's fascist regime. It has still to be readmitted.

== Club Rugby ==
In Southern Catalonia UE Santboiana, who have won the Spanish championship seven times, and FC Barcelona, are the best Catalan rugby union teams that compete in the División de Honor. In Northern Catalonia, USA Perpignan are the best-known Catalan club. They compete in the French Top 14 and also in European competitions such as the Heineken Cup and Amlin Challenge Cup

== National Side ==
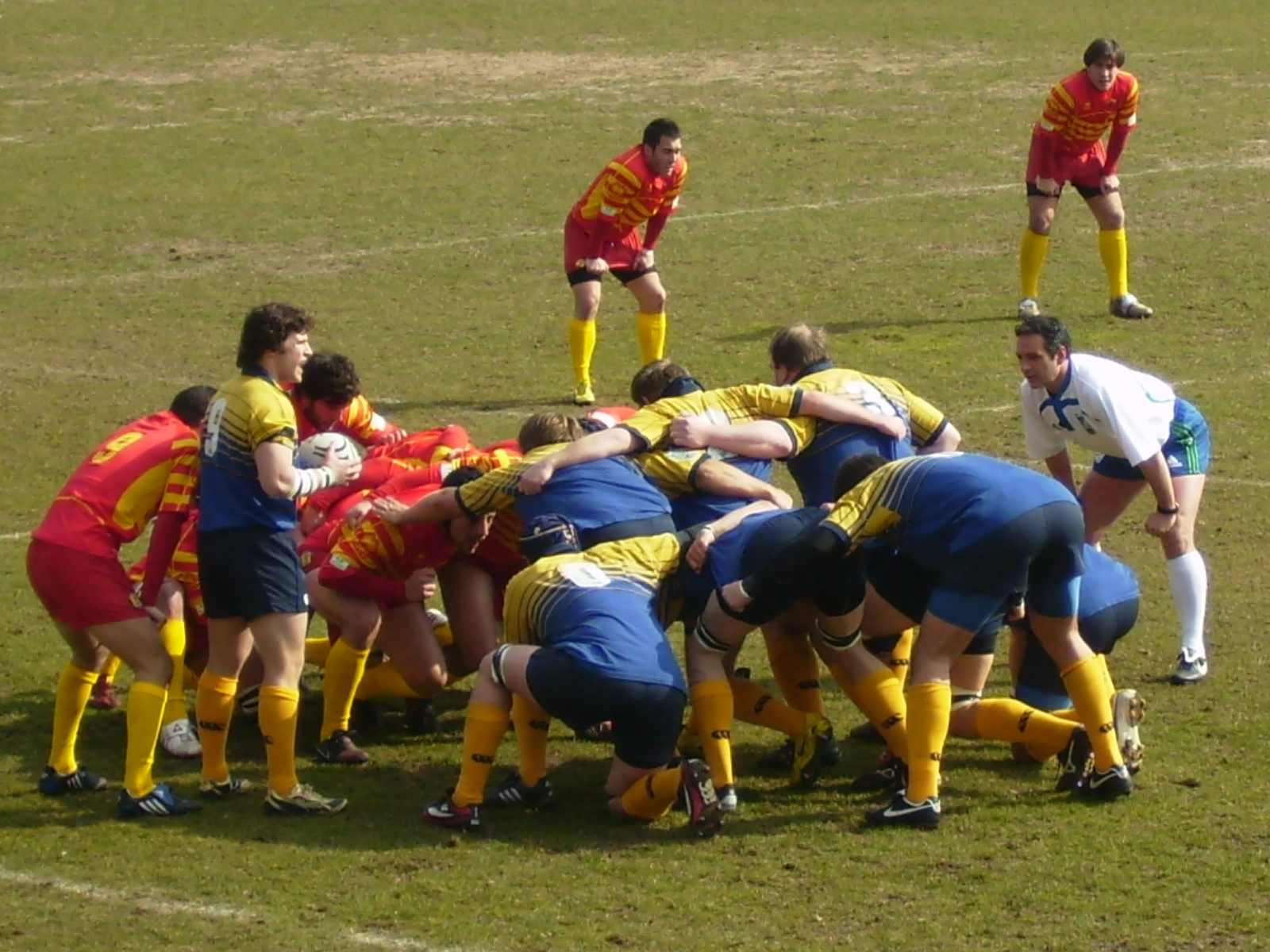
Catalion national team (Red) scrum down against Sweden.

The National side played its first match in 1923 against the French club team, Toulouse Lalande Olympique. Its first international match as an official national team was in 1934 against Italy. The teams tied, 5–5, in front of a crowd of more than 15,000 in the Camp de Les Corts. One month later Catalonia played France, losing 15–22.
