= Barcelona Universitari Club =

Spanish rugby union club, based in Barcelona

- Founded: 1929; 97 years ago
- Location: Barcelona, Catalonia, Spain
- Ground: La Foixarda
- President: Ramon Salinas
- Coach: Arturo Trenzano
- League: División de Honor B
1st kit	2nd kit

Barcelona Universitari Club is a Catalan Spanish rugby union team based in Barcelona established in 1929. Between 2002 and 2009, the club signed a collaboration convenium with USA Perpignan.

== History ==
=== The beginning ===
In 1929, a group of players from different clubs founded Rugby Club Universitario, with Ramón Eiximeno as chairman of the entity. Its first match was played on 25 December of the same year against another historic Catalan rugby club team, UE Santboiana. The following year, the club was incorporated to the Catalan Championship In 1930 many of the Unión Deportiva de Estudiantes Católicos players were incorporated and the club changed name to Barcelona Universitari Club. The club became a multi-discipline sports club, where are practiced Track and field, boxing, tennis, equestrianism, etc. With the creation of Universidad Autónoma de Barcelona, in 1933, the club starts to depend from its Patronage, with August Pi i Sunyer, who was then the chairman of the Spanish Olympic Committee, as chairman. In this period were organised several tours abroad which gave prestige to the club. In 1934 started the golden age of the club, which lasted until the outbreak of the Spanish Civil War. BUC became the Official Sports Organ of Universidad Autónoma. The following year, the club became the only representative organ of the university sports in Barcelona, and by extension, in Catalonia.

=== Post-war ===
After the war years, The reorganisation of BUC was planned. However, the opposition from the Francoist authorities, represented by the Youth Front and the University Students' Union made that this was not possible. These entities absorbed all the club's sections, as well as all its merits and documentation. In the late 1950s, the former founding players led by Zarraluqui and Ciscar, started the difficult task of raising the club. Several significant changes characterized this period: BUC changed its denomination to Barcelona Unión Club. The traditional club playing strip was changed from white to completely black uniforms. At this stage, the club limited its actions to the rugby section, with rugby union being the only sport currently practiced by the club.

In the period between the 1950s and the 1960s, BUC, with Julio Zarraluqui as chairman, consolidated itself both in at institutional and sports level. The club ended two times runner-up of 2 ª División Nacional and achieved a championship title in the same category. The tours to Catalonia by foreign clubs were consolidated, as well as the participation of the club in tours was higher than the tours of any other team at the time, playing all over Europe, including the Eastern European countries. In this period the senior team was created.

In the late 1960s, a social location was inaugurated near the Port of Barcelona, whose function was to give the club a physical location. In 1971, a new stage in the club's life started, based on the grassroots work with the intention to create a roster which fed the senior teams in a near future, creating the youth team. In these years, after the death of Julio Zarraluqui, the chairman seat was passed to Kepa Uriarte.

=== The Transition ===
With the end of the Franco Regime, the club kept going forward and in 1979, two new sections were created: the women's team, which had a brief two-year period and the foundations for the future rugby school started to be laid. With the political changes consolidated in Spain, the club Catalanised its name, in order to return to its first name, Barcelona Universitari Club. With the promotion to División de Honor in the 1987 season, a new era of consolidation in the top category started, where the club managed to stay at the top division and became runner-up in Copa del Rey. The lesser level categories, nonetheless, managed to win several Catalan Championships and the women's section of the club was recreated.

=== USAP-Barcelona ===
In 2002, BUC signed a collaboration agreement with USA Perpignan. As a result of this agreement, the club took the name USAP-Barcelona and changed its uniform from the now traditional black strip to the yellow and red of the club from Perpignan. In these years, the definitive folding of the CN Montjuïc rugby section caused the arrival of several players with which the club took a new impulse. The section became the transition towards professionalism, achieving in 2005 a new promotion to División de Honor .

=== Final years ===
In 2007, the USAP-Barcelona project came to an end, also coinciding with the exit of many players, the club descended to the regional division. In this same year, with a group of very young players, BUC won the Catalan Championship without losing any match in the league, winning the promotion to Primera Nacional. However, BUC would not play in said category, as it achieved an administrative promotion and went back to División de Honor B, where it would play until the 2010-11 section.
