= Gòtics RC =

Spanish rugby union club, based in Barcelona

- Full name: Gòtics Rugby Club
- Founded: 1984; 42 years ago
- Location: Barcelona, Spain
- Region: Catalonia
- Ground: Camp Municipal de Rugby La Foixarda

Official website
- gotics.com

Gòtics Rugby Club (Gòtics RC) is a rugby union from Barcelona established in 1984. They play their home matches at Camp Municipal de Rugbi La Foixarda.

Created as a result of the abolition of the RCD Espanyol's rugby section, four players from this section, Toni Rigat, Carles Tabernero, Josep Maria Vilajosana and Josep Cobo, formed a new rugby team, keeping the white and blue colours of the uniform.

== Story ==
The club was created in 1984, after the budget cuts made by R.C.D Espanyol in which it was decided to eliminate some of its sections, including the rugby section.

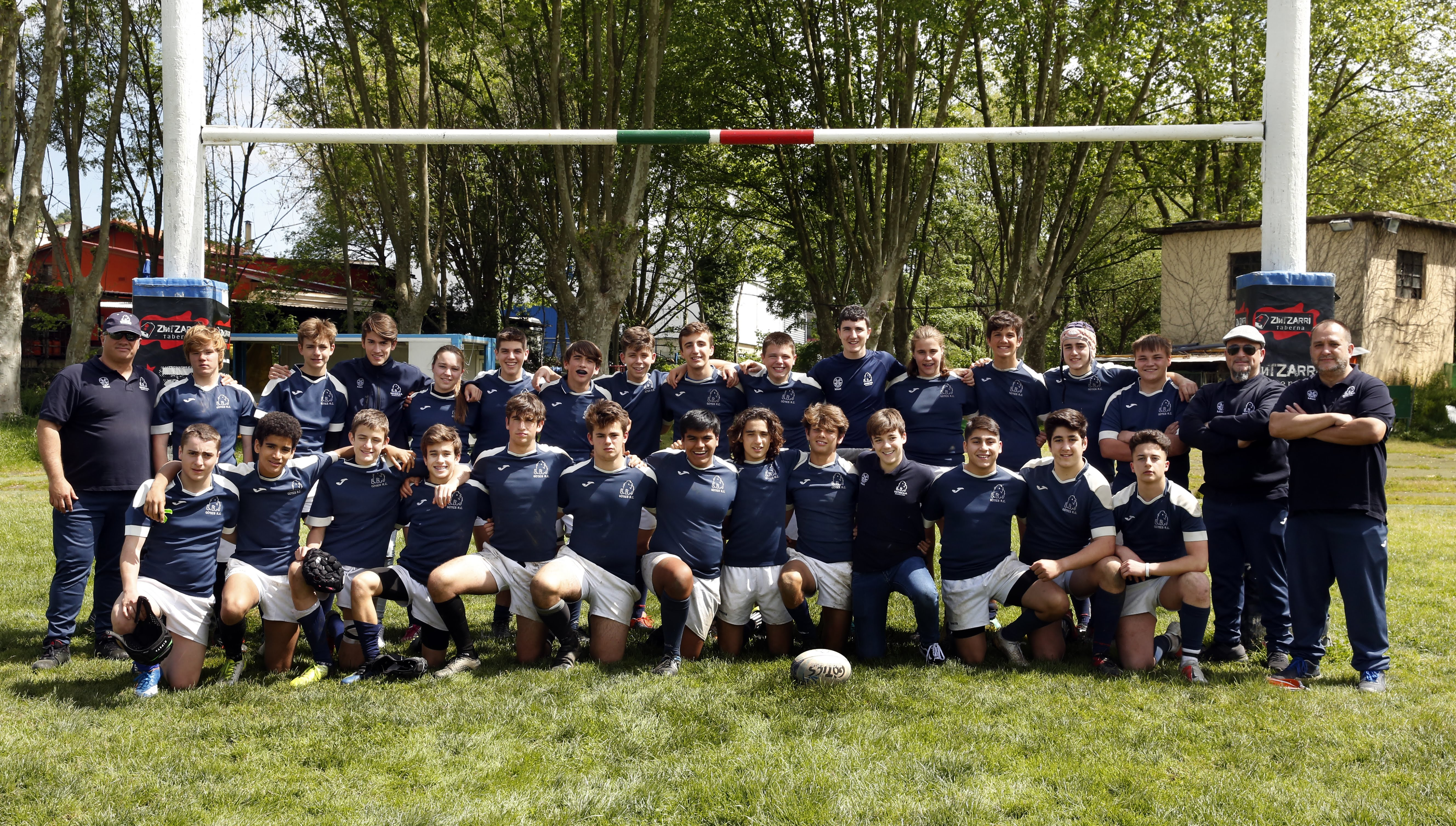
Gòtics RC under-16 team in 2018.

== Uniform ==
Gòtics RC's uniform is a simple but very formal and traditional uniform due to the one worn by the previous team (Espanyol Rugby Club) . The uniform colours are blue and white.

== Honours ==
Gòtics RC won the Catalan Rugby Championship in the 1987–88 season, winning its first championship. The club was runner-up in 1989, 2003, 2004, 2008, 2013, 2014 and 2016.
