= Basque Country national rugby union team =

Basque Country
- Nickname: Euskarians
- Emblem: Pottok horse
- Union: Basque Rugby Federation; Euskadiko Errugbi Federakundea
- Head coach: Patrice Lagisquet
First colours	Second colours

First international
- (Basque Country (autonomous community)) Basque Country 3–24 Wales (14 May 1983)
- Website: www.euskadirugby.org

Basque Country national rugby union team (Basque: Euskal Herriko errugbi selekzioa) is the national and/or representative rugby union team of the Basque Country. It is also sometimes referred to as the Basque Selection. They made their international debut on 14 May 1983 against Wales while the latter were on a tour of Spain. The Basque Country lost this game 3–24. Since 1985 the team has been organised by the Basque Rugby Federation.

== History ==
=== Friendlies ===
Since making their international debut against Wales in 1983, the Basque Country has regularly played international friendlies. They have also played regular friendlies against Basque club teams, including Aviron Bayonnais and Biarritz Olympique, and against touring club and provincial teams, including Ulster and Leinster.

=== Competitions ===
Since 1983–84 the Basque Country have competed in the Spanish Regions Championship, featuring other teams, such as Catalonia, representing the autonomous communities of Spain. This competition is organised by the Spanish Rugby Federation. The Basque Country were the inaugural winners of this competition. Since 2001–02 they have also competed in the European Regions Championship. On 8 December 2011 the Basque Country also played a Lisbon XV in the final of the Iberian Regions Cup, losing 22–30.

== List of international results ==
Date	Home	Score	Away	Venue
14 May 1983	(Basque Country (autonomous community)) Basque Country	3–24	Wales ^{[Note 1]}	Guernica
26 February 1984	(Basque Country (autonomous community)) Basque Country	24–12	Catalonia	^{[Note 2]}
12 May 1984	(Basque Country (autonomous community)) Basque Country	7–24	England U23	Hernani
1984–85	Portugal	12–6	(Basque Country (autonomous community)) Basque Country	
1985–86	(Basque Country (autonomous community)) Basque Country	23–13	Scotland Universities	
3 March 1985	(Basque Country (autonomous community)) Basque Country	25–4	Catalonia	^{[Note 2]}
21 September 1985	(Basque Country (autonomous community)) Basque Country	6–8	Zimbabwe	Getxo
5 June 1988	Catalonia	16–9	(Basque Country (autonomous community)) Basque Country	^{[Note 2]}
8 May 1990	(Basque Country (autonomous community)) Basque Country	3–64	England B	Anoeta Stadium
11 May 1990	(Basque Country (autonomous community)) Basque Country	56–15	Catalonia	San Mamés
1992–93	(Basque Country (autonomous community)) Basque Country	6–10	(Ireland) Irish Exiles	
1992–93	(Basque Country (autonomous community)) Basque Country	14–22	Spain	
1993–94	(Basque Country (autonomous community)) Basque Country	28–10	Catalonia	^{[Note 2]}
1993–94	(Basque Country (autonomous community)) Basque Country	11–21	Russia	
4 April 1995	(Basque Country (autonomous community)) Basque Country	41–10	Czech Republic	San Sebastián
1995–96	(Basque Country (autonomous community)) Basque Country	25–17	Catalonia	^{[Note 2]}
1996–97	(Basque Country (autonomous community)) Basque Country	37–14	Catalonia	^{[Note 2]}
1997–98	(Basque Country (autonomous community)) Basque Country	29–8	Catalonia	^{[Note 2]}
1997–98	(Basque Country (autonomous community)) Basque Country	31–31	Russia	
1998–99	(Basque Country (autonomous community)) Basque Country	8–17	Georgia	
3 March 1999	(Basque Country (autonomous community)) Basque Country	34–12	Portugal	Eibar
2003–04	(Basque Country (autonomous community)) Basque Country	33–25	Spain	
18 June 2006	Catalonia	17–21	(Basque Country (autonomous community)) Basque Country	Cornellà

Notes

- ^2 Spanish Regions Championship final

=== Recent results ===
6 September 2015
17:00 CEST (UTC+02)

Basque Country (Basque Country (autonomous community))	19–41	Uruguay
	Report

Campos Deportivos de Fadura, Getxo

Team details

FB	15	Jon Iturriria
RW	14	Ander Ayala
OC	13	Vincent Bordagaray
IC	12	Beñat Goicoetxea
LW	11	Clement Sallaber
FH	10	Igor Genua
SH	9	Pablo Feijóo
N8	8	Jon Magunazelaia
OF	7	Adrien Juanicotena
BF	6	Clement Pinon (c)
RL	5	Julen Zamakola
LL	4	Damien Elgoyhen
TP	3	Sebastien Guillemin
HK	2	David Pérez
LP	1	Ekaitz Sadaba
Replacements:
PR	16	Christophe Gaye
HK	17	Facundo Orive
PR	18	Iker Lavín
LK	19	Gastón Ibarburu
FL	20	William Broca
SH	21	Mikel Ezeiza
WG	22	Mathieu Betache
WG	23	Axier Álvarez de Eulate
Coach:
(France) Jean Pierre Elissalde

FB	15	Jerónimo Etcheverry
RW	14	Francisco Bulanti
OC	13	Joaquín Prada
IC	12	Alberto Román
LW	11	Rodrigo Silva
FH	10	Manuel Blengio
SH	9	Alejo Durán
N8	8	Agustín Alonso
OF	7	Fernando Bascou
BF	6	Juan de Freitas
RL	5	Mathias Palomeque
LL	4	Franco Lamanna
TP	3	Oscar Durán (c)
HK	2	Germán Kessler
LP	1	Mateo Sanguinetti
Replacements:
HK	16	Carlos Arboleya
PR	17	Mario Sagario
PR	18	Alejo Corral
LK	19	Jorge Zerbino
FL	20	Diego Magno
FL	21	Matías Beer
SH	22	Andrés Vilaseca
WG	23	Santiago Gibernau
Coach:
(Uruguay) Pablo Lemoine

17 November 2015
19:00 CET (UTC+01)

Basque Country (Basque Country (autonomous community))	31–14	Chile
Try: Juanicotena 18' c Pinon 39' c Achigar 49' c Genua 56' c Con: Guecainburu (4/4) 19', 40', 50', 57'; Pen: Guecainburu (1/1) 3'	Report	Try: Zamorano 52' c Soto 72' c Con: González (2/2) 53', 73'

Miniestadio de Anoeta, San Sebastián
Attendance: 1,200
Referee: Iñigo Atorrasagasti (Spain)

Team details

FB	15	Oier Garmendia
RW	14	Thomas Chouzenoux
OC	13	Guillen Giresse
IC	12	Peyo Achigar
LW	11	Clement Sallaber
FH	10	Stephane Guecainburu
SH	9	Pablo Feijoo
N8	8	Jean Yves Orabe
OF	7	Adrien Juanicotena
BF	6	Clement Pinon (c)
RL	5	Damien Elgoyhen
LL	4	Jean-Marc Zubizarreta (yellow card) 71' to 80'
TP	3	Bittor Aboitiz
HK	2	Unai Lasa
LP	1	Ion Insausti
Replacements:
PR	16	Xabi Argagnon
HK	17	Jojo Blaison
PR	18	Axier Álvarez de Eulate
LK	19	Igor Genua
FL	20	Battitt Chaudiere
SH	21	Thomas Erguy
WG	22	Florien Lapeyrade
WG	23	Mikel Meabebasterretxea
Coach:
(France) Jean Pierre Elissalde

FB	15	Francisco Urroz
RW	14	Franco Velarde
OC	13	Pablo Casas
IC	12	José Ignacio Larenas
LW	11	Italo Zunino
FH	10	Francisco González
SH	9	Juan Pablo Perrotta (c)
N8	8	Nikola Bursic
OF	7	Javier Richard
BF	6	Cristóbal Niedmann
RL	5	Felipe Bassaletti
LL	4	Raimundo Piwonka (yellow card) 79' to 80'
TP	3	Roberto Oyarzún
HK	2	Felipe Burgos
LP	1	Iñaki Gurruchaga
Replacements:
HK	16	Claudio Zamorano
PR	17	Sebastián Parra
PR	18	Sergio de la Fuente
LK	19	Benjamín Soto
FL	20	Hernán Amigo
FL	21	Sergio Bascuñán
SH	22	Francisco de la Fuente
WG	23	Leonardo Montoya
Coach:
(Australia) Paul Healy

Touch judges:
Pedro Montoya (Spain)
Arnaltz Bilbao (Spain)

== Honours ==
- Spanish Regions Championship
  - Winners: 1983–84, 1984–85, 1993–94, 1995–96, 1996–97, 1997–98, 1998–99, 2002–03, 2003–04, 2004–05, 2005–06, 2006–07, 2008–09, 2010–11: 14
  - Runners-up: 1987–88, 1994–95, 2000–01, 2000–01, 2001–02 : 5
- Iberian Regions Cup
  - Runners-up: 2011 : 1

== See also ==
- Basque Country women's national rugby union team
- List of Basque rugby union players
