= Alex Tulou =

NZ international rugby union player

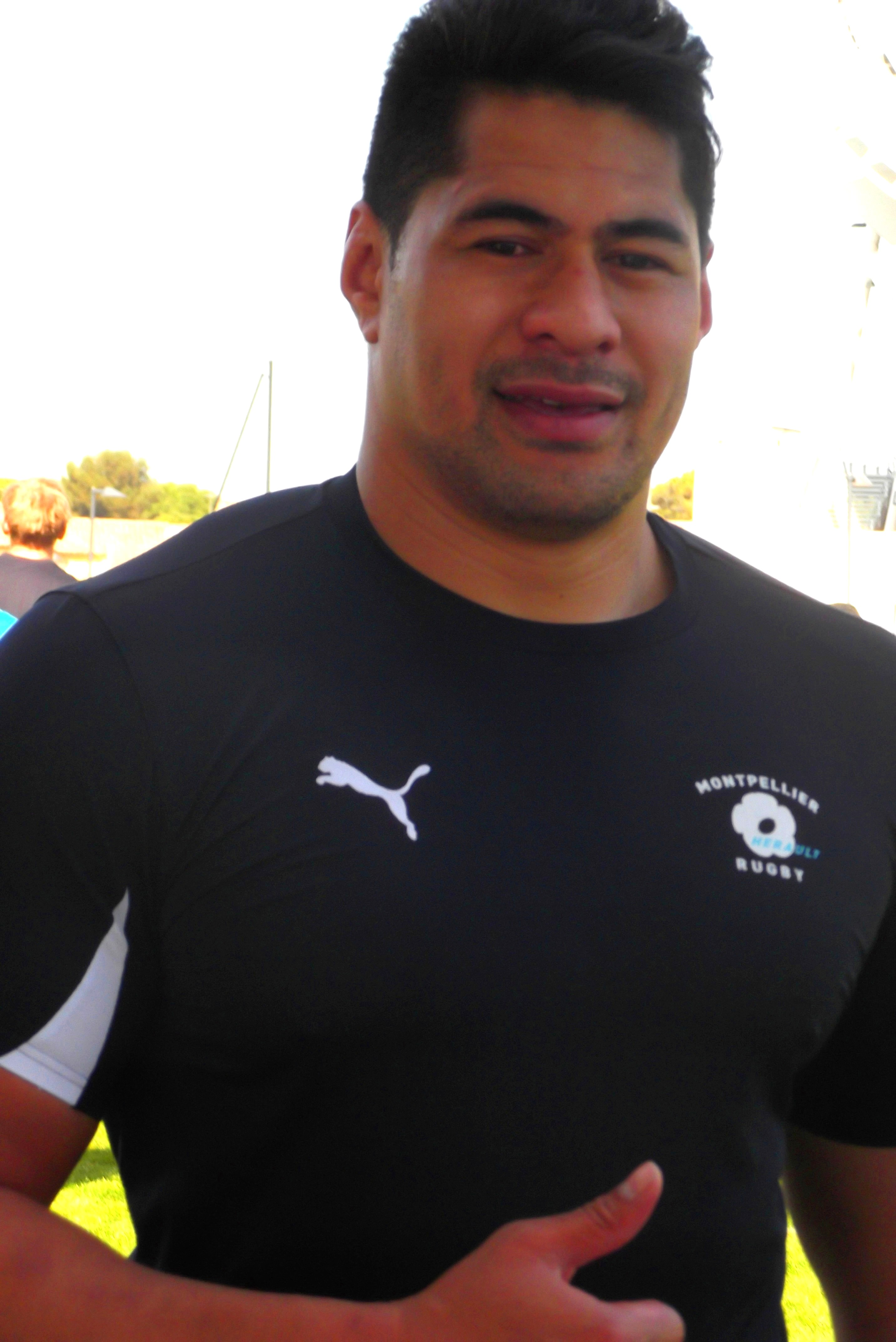
- Born: Alex Tulou Junior Tulou; 21 March 1987 (age 39) Faga'alu, American Samoa
- Height: 1.92 m (6 ft 3 1/2 in)
- Weight: 114 kg (251 lb)

Rugby union career
- Position: Flanker / Number 8
Senior career
Years	Team	Apps	(Points)
2010–2011	Bourgoin	19	(20)
2011–2015	Montpellier	88	(80)
2015-2020	Castres	92	(100)
2020–	Lyon	0	(0)
- Correct as of 5 February 2013
Provincial / State sides
Years	Team	Apps	(Points)
2006–2007	Wellington		
2008	Taranaki		
National sevens team
Years	Team		Comps
2008	New Zealand		1

Alex Tulou (born March 21, 1987, in Faga'alu, American Samoa) is a rugby union footballer, currently playing in the top French professional rugby competition, the Top 14, for Montpellier. He joined Montpellier in 2011. His usual position is number eight or Flanker.

== Career ==
Alex started his school boy rugby at Hastings Boys' High School in the province of Hawkes Bay, New Zealand. He was quickly identified as an up-and-coming young player with tremendous strength, ball skills and speed.

Tulou started his career with the Taranaki in the National Provincial Championship and the Hurricanes in the Super 14. During this time he had a trial for the New Zealand 7's team.

In 2010 he signed a two-year contract to play for Bourgoin in the Top 14. He played 15 Top 14 matches (9 starts and 6 as a replacement) for the club in the 2010/11 season, scoring 3 tries, and 4 matches in the European Challenge Cup, scoring one try.

Following this he signed for Montpellier to replace Jérôme Vallée after he was forced to retire due to injury. He played a further 8 matches for Montpellier in 2010/11 but failed to add to his try tally.

During the 2011/12 season, Tulou established himself as a first team regular for Montpellier, starting 19 of the team's 27 league games at Number 8 and was a replacement for 5 more. He scored 9 tries, including the team's first try in their end of season playoff defeat to Castres. Tulou also played in his first Heineken Cup matches, scoring one try.

In September 2012 it was announced that Tulou had signed a new contract to keep him at Montpellier until 2015.

Afterwards he signed for French rivals Castres from the 2015–16 season. Afterwards, he rejected a move to Pro D2 side Beziers, he instead signed for another French club Lyon to remain in the Top 14 from the 2020–21 season.

== Honours ==
=== Club ===
(France) Castres

- Top 14: 2017–18
