= Frédéric Cermeno =

France international rugby union & league footballer

- Born: 20 June 1979 (age 47) Perpignan, Pyrénées-Orientales, Occitania, France
- Height: 1.75 m (5 ft 9 in)
- Weight: 78 kg (172 lb)

Rugby union career
- Position(s): Wing, Fullback, Centre
Senior career
| Years | Team | Apps | (Points) |
| 1999–2006 | USA Perpignan | 223 | (85) |
| 2006–2007 | Castres | | |
| 2007–2009 | AS Béziers | | |
International career
| Years | Team | Apps | (Points) |
| | France | 1 | (5) |
| | France A | 4 | |
- Rugby league career

Playing information
Club
| Years | Team | Pld | T | G | FG | P |
|---|---|---|---|---|---|---|
| 2009 | Pia Donkeys |

Frédéric Cermeno (born 20 June 1979 in Perpignan), is a French rugby league and rugby union player. He has played at the club level for USA Perpignan.

== Career ==
Frédéric Cermeno began playing Rugby union with USA Perpignan, where he was a finalist for the Heineken Cup. He moved to Castres Olympique in 2006. The next year he played the Pro D2 with AS Béziers Hérault. He earned his only cap playing for the French national team on 28 May 2000 against the Romania at Bucharest. In 2009 he joined Pia Donkeys in rugby league.
