= Camp Municipal de Rugby La Foixarda =

Rugby stadium in Barcelona, Spain

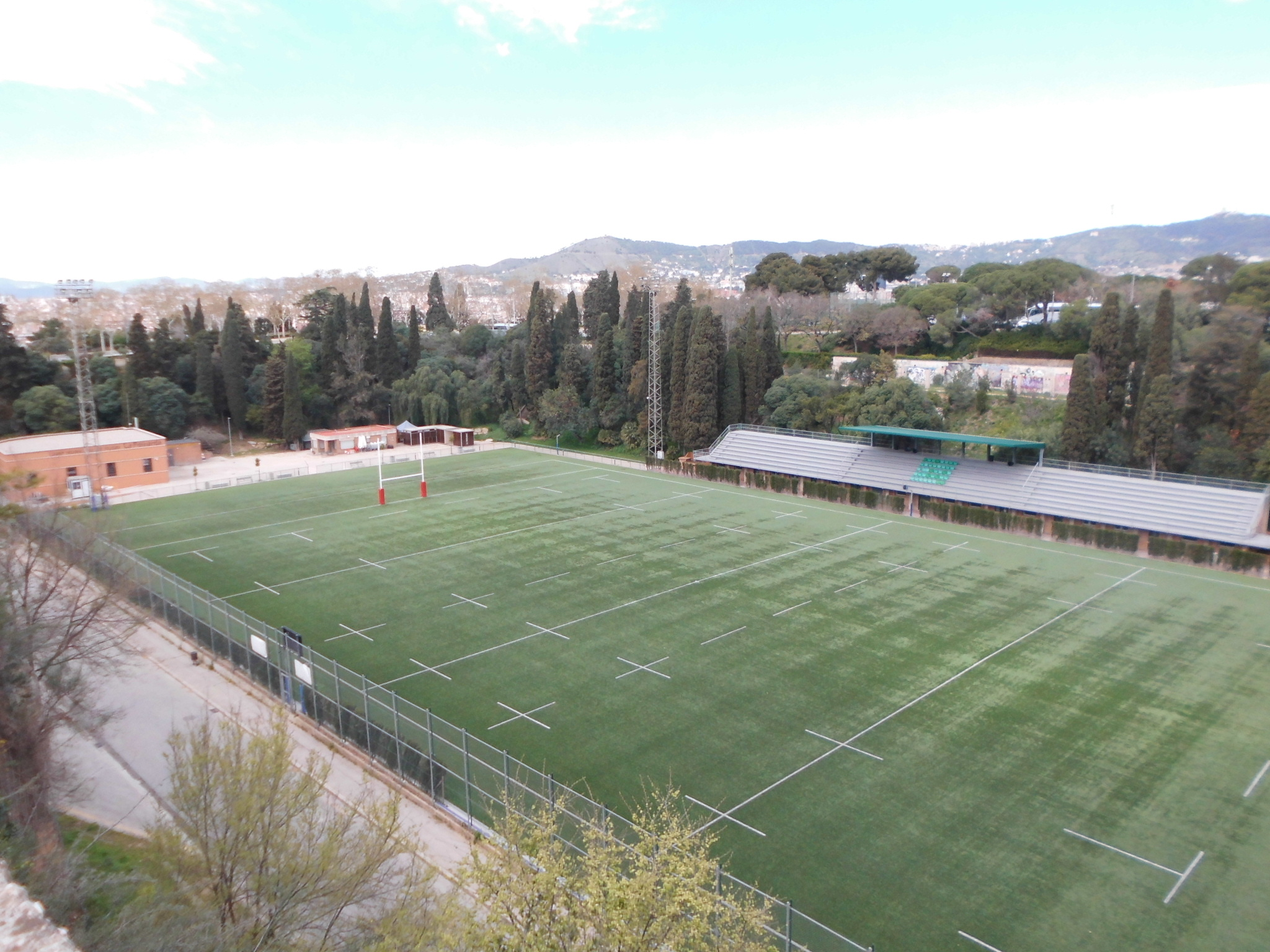
- Interactive map of Camp Municipal de Rugby La Foixarda
- Location: Sants-Montjuïc, Barcelona, Catalonia, Spain
- Coordinates: 41°21′11″N 2°08′49″E
- Capacity: 1.200

Construction
- Opened: 1921

Tenants
- Barcelona Universitari Club; Gòtics RC

Campo Municipal de Rugby La Foixarda is a rugby stadium located in the Sants-Montjuïc district, Barcelona, Catalonia, Spain. Its location lies in the Foixarda sector, in the Montjuic Park, in the Montjuïc, Barcelona, built in the site of the old Foixarda quarry's ravine, known as El Sot de la Foixarda. The field is habitually used as home ground by Gòtics RC and Barcelona Universitari Club and, occasionally, used by Spain national rugby union team and Catalonia national rugby union team. It is a natural grass field opened in 1921 and holds about 1.200 people.

== History ==
The field was inaugurated on 25 December 1921 when a football friendly match between F.C. Barcelona and Sparta Praha was being disputed, with the intention of converting the field into the main stadium of the 1924 Olympic Games, with the name "Stadium Catalán".

In 1955, the field was the rugby union venue in that year's Mediterranean Games edition, disputed in Barcelona. It was also the venue for the Copa del Rey de Rugby final, in the 1956, 1957, 1958, 1959, 1960, 1965, 1966 and 1985 seasons.

In 2013, were started the works to replace the natural grass surface, in poor conditions, with an artificial grass surface, with a new draining and irrigation network. The floodlights were also replacing, equipping its facilities of all the necessary equipment, everything homologated by the Spanish Rugby Federation. The price of the works was calculated in € 775,589.

== Capacity ==
In its days, the field held 25.000 spectators, although its current capacity is around 1.200 spectators.
