= La Única RT =

Spanish rugby union club, based in Pamplona

La Única Rugby Taldea
- Founded: 1984; 42 years ago
- Location: Pamplona, Spain
- Ground: UPNA
- League: División de Honor B de Rugby
Team kit

La Única RT is a Spanish rugby union team based in Pamplona.
