= Bernard Goutta =

French rugby league/rugby union footballer and coach

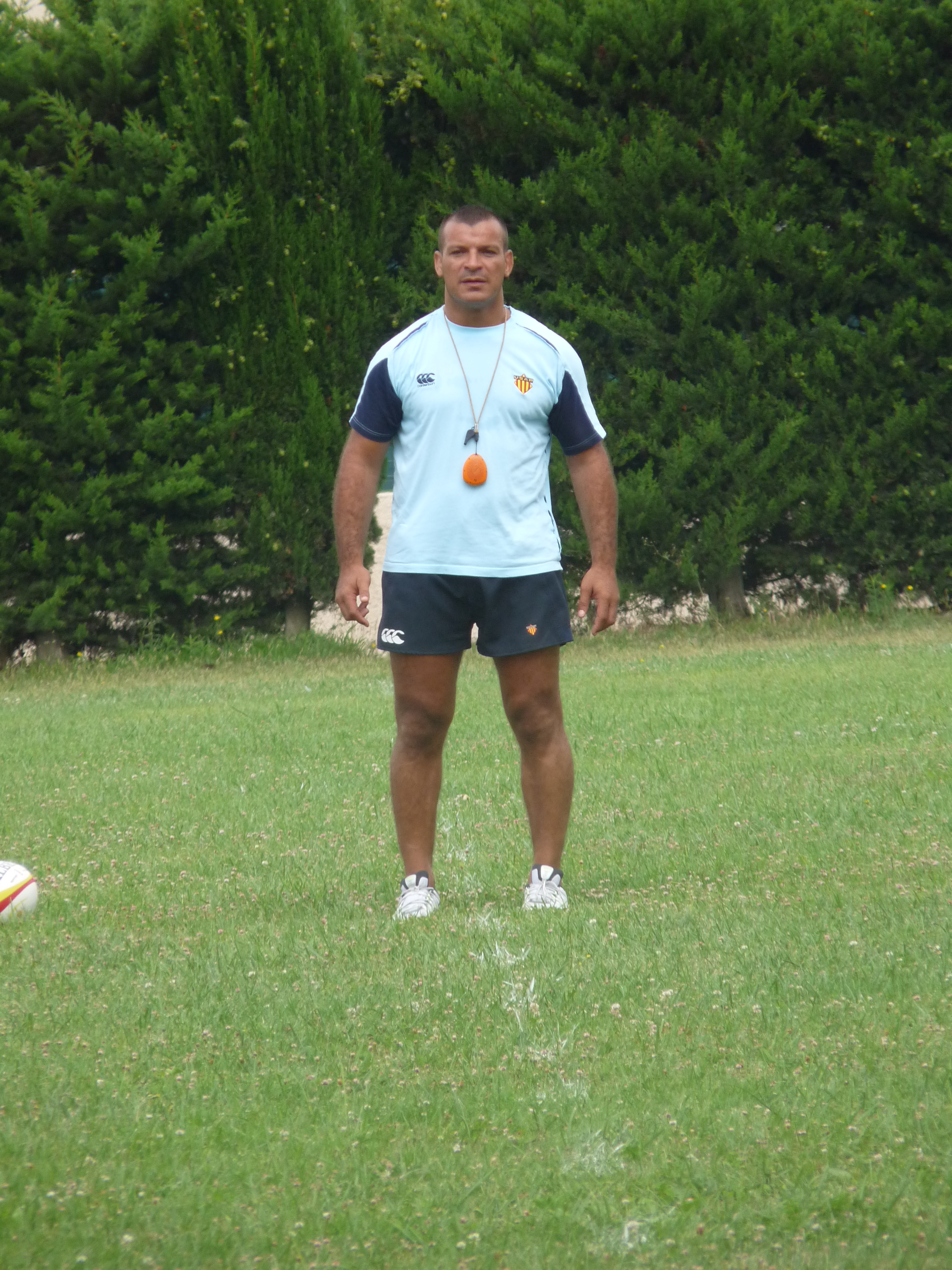

Personal information
- Born: 28 September 1972 (age 54) Perpignan, France
- Height: 1.85 m (6 ft 1 in)
- Weight: 103 kg (227 lb)

Playing information
- Position: Back-row
Club
Years	Team	Pld	T	G	FG	P
1989–1991	Saint Estève XIII
1991–1994	Pia Donkeys
	Total	0	0	0	0	0

Rugby union career
- Position: Flanker
Senior career
Years	Team	Apps	(Points)
1994–2007	USA Perpignan	223	(85)
International career
Years	Team	Apps	(Points)
	France	1	(5)
	France A	4	
Coaching career
- Years: Team
- 2007–: USA Perpignan

Bernard Goutta (born 28 September 1972 in Perpignan), is a French former professional rugby league and rugby union footballer and current rugby union coach. He is now co-head coach of his former union club, USA Perpignan, following the sacking of predecessor Jacques Brunel in November 2011.

Goutta began playing Rugby League at with Saint Estève XIII, then with the Pia Donkeys. He switched code, playing Rugby Union for Perpignan. He earned his only cap for the France national team on 10 July 2004 against the Canada at Toronto. After ending his playing career, he joined Brunel's staff as forwards coach.

== Honours ==
- French rugby champion, 2009 with USA Perpignan (assistant coach)
- French rugby champion finalist, 1998, 2004 (player), 2010 (assistant coach)
- Heineken Cup runner up: 2003 (player)
