= 2024–25 Liga Iberdrola de Rugby =

- Countries: Spain
- Number of teams: 8
- Date: 26 October 2024 –
- Champions: Colina Clinic El Salvador (1st title)
- Runners-up: Silicius Majadahonda
- Relegated: Social Energy AVRFCB
- Matches played: 45
- Tries scored: 315 (average 7 per match)
- Top point scorer: (Spain) María Miguel (Colina Clinic El Salvador) – 115 points
- Top try scorer: (Spain) María Miguel (Colina Clinic El Salvador) – 23 tries

The 2024–25 Liga Iberdrola de Rugby will be the 15th season of the Liga Iberdrola de Rugby, the top flight of Spanish domestic women's rugby union competition and the 9th to be sponsored by Iberdrola. The reigning champions entering the season where Majadahonda who claimed their 4th league title after winning the 2023-24 final against CRAT Residencia Rialta.

== Teams ==
2024–25 Liga Iberdrola de Rugby Teams

Eight teams compete in the league – the top six teams from the previous season, Getxo RT who were promoted as champions of the 2023–24 Honor Division B, and Cisneros promoted as winners of the relegation playoff. They replaced Olímpico de Pozuelo and Eibar RT.

Team	Captain	Head coach	Stadium	Capacity	City
(Galicia (Spain)) CRAT Residencia RIALTA	Alba Rubial Lalín	Pablo Artime	Elviña	1500	A Coruña
(Community of Madrid) Complutense Cisneros	Alba María Alonso Pérez	Alejandra Betancur	Campo Central CIU	12400	Madrid
(Castile and León) Colina Clinic El Salvador	Elisa Castro Camarero	Michael Walker-Fitton	Estadio Pepe Rojo	2500	Valladolid
(Basque Country (autonomous community)) Getxo	Haieza Arco Villar	Muir Kara Thompson	Polideportivo Fadura	510	Getxo
(Catalonia) Sant Cugat	Sara Marín i Puyuelo	Jordi Justicia Rodríguez	ZEM La Guinardera	500	Sant Cugat del Vallès
(Community of Madrid) Silicius Majadahonda	Lucía Díaz Martín	Xabier Rodríguez	Valle del Arcipreste	200	Majadahonda
(Andalusia) Simón Verde Magnolia Cocos	Julia Castro Camino	Massimo Sandri	La Cartuja	1932	Sevilla
(Community of Madrid) Social Energy AVRFCB	Silvia Juliá i Rossell	Stacy Steve Duvenage Berry	La Teixonera	240	Barcelona

== Table ==
Pos	Team	P	W	D	L	PF	PA	PD	TF	TA	TD	TBP	DBP	Pts
1	Colina Clinic El Salvador	10	9	0	1	420	125	295	65	19	46	8	1	45
2	Silicius Majadahonda	10	8	0	2	283	199	84	46	31	15	5	0	37
3	Simón Verde Magnolia Cocos	10	6	0	4	268	187	81	41	28	13	4	1	29
4	Sant Cugat	10	4	0	6	163	212	-49	27	33	-6	2	1	19
5	Getxo	10	5	0	5	204	218	-14	31	35	-4	2	1	23
6	Complutense Cisneros	10	4	0	6	158	255	-97	24	39	-15	2	2	20
7	CRAT Residencia Rialta	10	2	0	8	153	295	-142	23	46	-23	1	1	10
8	Social Energy AVRFCB	10	2	0	8	110	268	-158	16	42	-26	1	0	9
First Two are semi-finals places. Third to Sixth are quarter-finals places. Second to last plays a relegation playoff against Honor Division B runner-up. Last placed relegated to Honor Division B.

== Regular season ==
Fixtures for the season were announced by the Spanish Rugby Federation on 16 July 2024. The season will use the same format as the previous one: every team will play each other once. Then the teams are split into 2 groups. Group A comprises the first 4 placed and Group B the 4 last. Teams play again against the others on their group, thus reaching a total of 10 rounds. The schedule for the second phase of the regular season was announced by the Spanish Rugby Federation on 29 January 2025.

=== Round 1 ===
26 October 2024	(DBP) Complutense Cisneros	10–15	Silicius Majadahonda	Campo Central CIU, Madrid
16:00 CEST (UTC+2)	Try: Sonia Montero 45' m Iratxe Aramburu 57' m		Try: Eva Aguirre 10' m Marta Ferrándiz 17' m Chloë Arroyo 62' m Cards: Claudia Pérez (yellow card) 36'	Attendance: 250; Referee: José Luis Murillo García-Gil (RFER)

27 October 2024	(TBP) Colina Clinic El Salvador	29–3	Sant Cugat	Estadio Pepe Rojo, Valladolid
12:00 CET (UTC+1)	Try: Carla Méndez 21' c María Miguel 57' c Penalty Try 69'; Carmen Martos 80'; Con: Alba Alpín (2) 22', 58'; Pen: Alba Alpín 6'; Cards: Belén Castellano (yellow card) 45'		Pen: Zoe Marie Elise Bastide 28'; Cards: Lara Cook (yellow card) 18'; Marina García (yellow card) 69'	Referee: Luis Fernández Díaz (RFER)

27 October 2024	(DBP) Getxo	27–31	Simón Verde Magnolia Cocos	Polideportivo Fadura, Getxo
12:00 CET (UTC+1)	Try: Lucía Guerra 15' m Haizea Arco 39' m Garazi Goikoiea 48' m Joana Murray (2) 54' c, 68' m Con: Naroa Azpitarte 55'		Try: Blanca Ruíz 1' c Laura Muñiz 9' c Julia Castro 36' c Marta Carmona 44' m Ana Peralta 60' m Con: Carolina Fernanda Alfaro (3) 2', 10', 37'; Cards: Ana Peralta (yellow card) 30'; Mariana Londoño (yellow card) 54'	Referee: David Joaquín Castro Muñiz (RFER)

27 October 2024	Social Energy AVRFCB	17–16	CRAT Residencia Rialta (DBP)	La Teixonera, Barcelona
14:00 CET (UTC+1)	Try: Gaïa Tartinville 19' m Martina Márquez 44' m Sara Mendavia 62' c Con: Sara Rodríguez 63'		Try: Mariana Romero 35' m Ana Iglesias 70' m Pen: Ana Iglesias (2) 11', 25'; Cards: Hannah Smid (yellow card) 62'	Attendance: 156; Referee: Lorena Martínez Fernández (RFER)

=== Round 2 ===
2 November 2024	(TBP) Simón Verde Magnolia Cocos	39–8	Social Energy AVRFCB	La Cartuja, Seville
14:00 CET (UTC+1)	Try: Ana Peralta 27' c Marieta Román 35' m Laura Muñiz (2) 44' m, 56' m Kasandra Sylla 53' c Marta Carmona (2) 56' m, 77' m Con: Lea Ducher 28'; Marta Carmona 54'; Cards: Julia Castro (yellow card) 80'		Try: Gael Albesa 13' m Pen: Sara Rodríguez 55'; Cards: Paula Garzón (yellow card) 11'	Referee: Alfonso Mirat Serván (RFER)

2 November 2024	(TBP) Silicius Majadahonda	39–5	Getxo	Valle del Arcipreste, Majadahonda
16:00 CET (UTC+1)	Try: Rocío Rodera 10' m Eva Aguirre 20' m Lucía Díaz 25' c Abril Martín 39' m Claudia Pérez (2) 44' m, 50' m Mónica Arias 75' c Con: Martina Márquez (2) 26', 76'		Try: Iciar Pozo 56' m	Referee: Carlos Guerrero Padín (RFER)

2 November 2024	Sant Cugat	10–32	Complutense Cisneros (TBP)	ZEM La Guinardera, Sant Cugat del Vallès
16:00 CET (UTC+1)	Try: Alba Masdevall 16' m Marina García 55' m		Try: Iratxe Aramburu (2) 13' c, 43' m Sonia Montero 18' m Claudia Cano 21' m Ingrid Algar 58' m Alba María Alonso 68' m Con: Sonia Montero 14'; Cards: Elsa del Pino (yellow card) 49'; Iratxe Aramburu (yellow card) 59'	Referee: Daniel Sarrión García (RFER)

3 November 2024	CRAT Residencia Rialta	14–55	Colina Clinic El Salvador (TBP)	Elviña, A Coruña
12:00 CET (UTC+1)	Try: Hannah Smid (2) 22' c, 28' c Con: Ana Iglesias (2) 23', 29'; Cards: Sofia Bekir (yellow card) 45'		Try: María Miguel (3) 7' c, 37' m, 63' c Tecla Masoko (3) 16' m, 19' m, 49' c Penalty Try 45'; Claudia de la Loma 55' m Matilda Toca 80' c Con: Alba Alpín (2) 8', 50'; Bingbing Vergara (2) 64', 80+1'	Referee: David Joaquín Castro Muñiz (RFER)

=== Round 3 ===
9 November 2024	Simón Verde Magnolia Cocos	19–39	Silicius Majadahonda (TBP)	La Cartuja, Seville
16:00 CET (UTC+1)	Try: Lea Ducher (2) 5' c, 15' m Marta Carmona 27' c Con: Lea Ducher (2) 6', 28'; Cards: Ana Peralta (yellow card) 49'; Miriam Roig (yellow card) 60'; María Estepa (yellow card) 74'		Try: Lucía Díaz 39' c Abril Martín (2) 46' m, 57' m Penalty Try 50'; Mónica Arias 61' c María Marín 77' m Con: Martina Márquez (2) 40', 62'; Pen: Martina Márquez 67'	Referee: Jenny Lee (RFER)

10 November 2024	Getxo	5–29	Sant Cugat (TBP)	Polideportivo Fadura, Getxo
11:30 CET (UTC+1)	Try: Joana Murray 76' m		Try: Irene Aires 4' m Gina Navarro 33' m Inés Bueso-Inchausti 37' m Marina García 45' c Sara Marín 60' c Con: Inés Bueso-Inchausti (2) 46', 61'	Referee: David Joaquín Castro Muñiz (RFER)

10 November 2024	Complutense Cisneros	17–5	CRAT Residencia Rialta	Campo Central CIU, Madrid
12:00 CET (UTC+1)	Try: Zahía Pérez (2) 4' c, 43' m Ingrid Algar 34' m Con: Elisa Álvarez 5'		Try: Mariana Romero 78' m	Attendance: 200; Referee: Luis Lasala de la Rosa (RFER)

10 November 2024	Social Energy AVRFCB	3–42	Colina Clinic El Salvador (TBP)	La Teixonera, Barcelona
12:00 CET (UTC+1)	Pen: Sara Rodríguez 70'		Try: Tecla Masoko 3' m Beatriz Rivera 40' c Belsay Escudero 50' m Ángela Diez 53' c María Miguel 59' m Amaia Fabo 71' m Jimena Torres 79' m Con: Bingbing Vergara (2) 40', 54'; Pen: Bingbing Vergara 15'	Referee: Luis Fernández Díaz (RFER)

=== Round 4 ===
14 December 2024	(TBP) Silicius Majadahonda	29–10	Social Energy AVRFCB	Valle del Arcipreste, Majadahonda
16:00 CET (UTC+1)	Try: Pilar Soria 30' c Lucía Díaz 37' c Eva Aguirre 77' c Claudia Pérez 79' m Con: Martina Márquez (3) 31', 38', 78'; Pen: Martina Márquez 18'		Try: Gaïa Tartinville 62' c Con: Sara Rodríguez 63'; Pen: Sara Rodríguez 33'; Cards: Paula Garzón (red card) 70'	Attendance: 129; Referee: Lorena Martínez Fernández (RFER)

15 December 2024	(TBP) Colina Clinic El Salvador	64–8	Complutense Cisneros	Estadio Pepe Rojo, Valladolid
11:00 CET (UTC+1)	Try: Beatriz Rivera 2' m Tecla Masoko (2) 4' c, 20' c María Miguel (4) 32' m, 37' c, 42' c, 53' c Matilda Toca 55' c Alba Alpín 64' c Julia Navarro 71' m Con: Bingbing Vergara (7) 5', 21', 38', 43', 54', 56', 65'		Try: Sonia Montero 48' m Con: Candela Cembrano 76'; Cards: Celia Dávila (yellow card) 37'	Referee: Carlos Guerrero Padín (RFER)

15 December 2024	CRAT Residencia Rialta	15–25	Getxo	Elviña, A Coruña
12:00 CET (UTC+1)	Try: Luxora Suárez 43' c Sofia Bekir 63' m Con: Ana Iglesias 44'; Pen: Ana Iglesias 17'; Cards: Luxora Suárez (yellow card) 75'		Try: Lucía Guerra 5' c Joana Murray 20' c Garazi Goikoiea 48' m Con: Naroa Azpitarte (2) 6', 21'; Pen: Naroa Azpitarte (2) 30', 75'; Cards: Lucía Petraccaro (yellow card) 59'; Aitziber Tamara (yellow card) 64'	Referee: Alberto Díaz Camarero (RFER)

15 December 2024	Sant Cugat	5–15	Simón Verde Magnolia Cocos	ZEM La Guinardera, Sant Cugat del Vallès
12:30 CET (UTC+1)	Try: Ana Harris 75' m		Try: Ana Peralta 4' c Marta Núnez 20' m Con: Lea Ducher 5'; Pen: Carolina Fernanda Alfaro 39'; Cards: Carolina Fernanda Alfaro (yellow card) 50'; María del Carmen Fernández (yellow card) 67'; Mariana Londoño (yellow card) 77'	Attendance: 136; Referee: Daniel Sarrión García (RFER)

=== Round 5 ===
21 December 2024	(TBP) Silicius Majadahonda	34–17	Sant Cugat	Valle del Arcipreste, Majadahonda
16:00 CET (UTC+1)	Try: Claudia Pérez 18' m Eva Aguirre 28' c Chloë Arroyo 34' c Abril Martín 40' m Martina Márquez 70' m Alicia Guío 80' m Con: Martina Márquez (2) 29', 35'		Try: Alba Masdevall 9' m Gina Navarro 59' m Mireia García 61' c Con: Inés Bueso-Inchausti 62'; Cards: Maitane Ibáñez (yellow card) 40'	Referee: Andoni Susperregui Iragorri (RFER)

21 December 2024	(TBP) Social Energy AVRFCB	29–6	Complutense Cisneros	La Teixonera, Barcelona
16:00 CET (UTC+1)	Try: Gaïa Tartinville 14' c Sara Rodríguez 29' c Sara Mendavia (2) 42' m, 79' c Con: Sara Rodríguez (3) 15', 30', 80'; Pen: Sara Rodríguez 35'		Pen: Zahía Pérez (2) 11', 37'	Referee: Joaquín Santoro Ferreiro (RFER)

21 December 2024	Getxo	13–29	Colina Clinic El Salvador (TBP)	Polideportivo Fadura, Getxo
16:30 CET (UTC+1)	Try: Garazi Goikolea 52' m Naroa Azpitarte 80' m Pen: Naroa Azpitarte 37'		Try: María Miguel (3) 4' m, 15' m, 31' c Alba Alpín 39' m Sidorella Bracic 43' c Con: Bingbing Vergara (2) 32', 44'; Cards: Kiara Espósito (yellow card) 47'; Belén Castellano (yellow card) 65'	Attendance: 200; Referee: Lluís Llauger Suau (RFER)

22 December 2024	(TBP) Simón Verde Magnolia Cocos	27–7	CRAT Residencia Rialta	La Cartuja, Seville
11:00 CET (UTC+1)	Try: Marieta Román 21' c Carolina Fernanda Alfaro 26' m Nicole Cerulli 33' c Araceli Baena 55' m Con: Carolina Fernanda Alfaro (2) 22', 34'; Pen: Carolina Fernanda Alfaro 14'		Try: Carla Ramón 79' c Con: Hannah Smid 79'	Attendance: 56; Referee: Álvaro García de las Mestas García (RFER)

=== Round 6 ===
25 January 2025	(DBP) Complutense Cisneros	12–17	Getxo	Campo Central CIU, Madrid
15:30 CET (UTC+1)	Try: Lourdes Novillo 35' c Irene Simón 63' m Con: Zahía Pérez 36'		Try: Lucía Petraccaro 11' c Garazi Goikolea 13' c Con: Naroa Azpitarte (2) 12', 14'; Pen: Naroa Azpitarte 45'	Attendance: 250; Referee: Alhambra Nievas (RFER)

25 January 2025	Social Energy AVRFCB	7–25	Sant Cugat (TBP)	La Teixonera, Barcelona
17:00 CET (UTC+1)	Try: Paula Garzón 68' c Con: Martina Campoy 69'		Try: Mireia García (2) 47' c, 57' m Berta Gimeno 64' m Martina Benito 77' m Con: Inés Bueso-Inchausti 48'; Pen: Inés Bueso-Inchausti 9'	Referee: Alexandre Mullor Armadà (RFER)

26 January 2025	Colina Clinic El Salvador	27–12	Simón Verde Magnolia Cocos	Estadio Pepe Rojo, Valladolid
12:00 CET (UTC+1)	Try: María Miguel (2) 12' c, 76' c Kiara Espósito 53' m Beatriz Rivera 62' m Con: Bingbing Vergara (2) 13', 76'; Pen: Bingbing Vergara 71'		Try: Araceli Baena 27' m Cecilia Benza 47' c Con: Carolina Fernanda Alfaro 47'; Cards: Kasandra Sylla (yellow card) 75'	Referee: Marc Riera (RFER)

30 March 2025	CRAT Residencia Rialta	5–71	Silicius Majadahonda (TBP)	Elviña, A Coruña
12:00 CEST (UTC+2)	Try: Hannah Smid 7' m		Try: Celia Palumbo (2) 2' m, 35' c Vico Gorrochategui 21' m Alba Noa Castellano (2) 27' c, 46' c Carlota Caicoya (4) 31' c, 48' c, 56' c, 79' m Chloë Arroyo 39' c Marina Díaz 71' c Con: María Arzuaga (7) 28', 32', 36', 40', 47', 49', 57'; Carlota Caicoya 72'; Cards: Rocío Tenorio (yellow card) 64'	Referee: Carlos Guerrero Padín (RFER)

=== Round 7 ===
18 January 2025	(TBP) Simón Verde Magnolia Cocos	50–6	Complutense Cisneros	La Cartuja, Seville
16:00 CET (UTC+1)	Try: Florencia Moreno (2) 1' c, 26' m Marieta Román (3) 6' c, 43' m, 52' c Ana Peralta 23' m Araceli Baena 37' c Nicole Cerulli 66' c Con: Carolina Fernanda Alfaro (5) 1', 6', 37', 52', 66'		Pen: Zahía Pérez (2) 46', 54'	Attendance: 290; Referee: José Luis Murillo García-Gil (RFER)

19 January 2025	(TBP) Getxo	33–12	Social Energy AVRFCB	Polideportivo Fadura, Getxo
12:00 CET (UTC+1)	Try: Garazi Goikolea 5' c Iciar Pozo 42' m Joana Murray 55' c Lucía Guerra 61' c Naroa Azpitarte 70' c Con: Naroa Azpitarte (4) 6', 57', 62', 71'; Cards: Ariane Torrontegui (yellow card) 25'		Try: Sara Martori 9' c Laia González 26' m Con: Sara Rodríguez 10'	Attendance: 123; Referee: Alberto Díaz Camarero (RFER)

19 January 2025	Silicius Majadahonda	22–47	Colina Clinic El Salvador (TBP)	Valle del Arcipreste, Majadahonda
12:00 CET (UTC+1)	Try: Chloë Arroyo (2) 5' m, 58' m Valentina Maldonado 50' m Marta Ferrándiz 66' c Con: María Arzuaga 67'; Cards: Lucía Calvo (yellow card) 53'		Try: María Miguel (2) 8' m, 54' c Matilda Toca 20' c Amaia Fabo 36' c Beatriz Rivera 41' c Tecla Masoko 61' c Carla Méndez 79' c Con: Bingbing Vergara (6) 21', 37', 42', 55', 62', 80'; Cards: María Miguel (yellow card) 77'	Attendance: 200; Referee: Eki Fanlo Antzin (RFER)

19 January 2025	Sant Cugat	33–17	CRAT Residencia Rialta	ZEM La Guinardera, Sant Cugat del Vallès
15:00 CET (UTC+1)	Try: Gina Navarro 24' c Alba Masdevall (2) 36' c, 42' c Marina García 50' m Mireia García 79' c Con: Inés Bueso-Inchausti (4) 25', 37', 43', 80'		Try: Mariana Romero 29' m Alba Martínez 45' c Hannah Smid 61' m Con: Hannah Smid 46'	Referee: Joaquín Santoro Ferreiro (RFER)

=== Round 8 ===
15 February 2025	(TBP) Simón Verde Magnolia Cocos	39–7	Sant Cugat	La Cartuja, Seville
16:00 CET (UTC+1)	Try: Martina Fernández (3) 12' c, 18' m, 52' c Marta Carmona 30' c Florencia Moreno 67' c Con: Carolina Fernanda Alfaro (4) 13', 31', 53', 68'; Pen: Carolina Fernanda Alfaro (2) 22', 75'		Try: Sarah Gossmann 62' c Con: Inés Bueso-Inchausti 63'	Attendance: 259; Referee: Lorena Martínez Fernández (RFER)

15 February 2025	(TBP) Getxo	39–10	Complutense Cisneros	Polideportivo Fadura, Getxo
16:00 CET (UTC+1)	Try: Lucía Guerra 39' m Iciar Pozo 47' m Jone Etxegia 55' c Garazi Goikolea 59' m June Larrañaga 65' m Con: Naroa Azpitarte 56'; Pen: Naroa Azpitarte (4) 14', 31', 37', 50'		Try: Laura Marco 75' c Con: Zahía Pérez 76'; Pen: Zahía Pérez 17'; Cards: Paula Canales (yellow card) 53'	Attendance: 450; Referee: Roger Parera Villacampa (RFER)

16 February 2025	(TBP) Colina Clinic El Salvador	61–5	Silicius Majadahonda	Estadio Pepe Rojo, Valladolid
12:00 CET (UTC+1)	Try: Carla Méndez (2) 6' c, 37' c Tecla Masoko (3) 12' c, 27' c, 60' m Ángela Diez 23' c María Miguel (2) 45' c, 57' c Amaia Fabo 79' c Con: Bingbing Vergara (6) 7', 13', 24', 28', 38', 46'; Alba Alpín (2) 58', 80'; Cards: Nerea García (yellow card) 49'		Try: Lucía Díaz 48' m	Referee: Joaquín Santoro Ferreiro (RFER)

16 February 2025	(TBP) CRAT Residencia Rialta	26–5	Social Energy AVRFCB	Elviña, A Coruña
12:30 CET (UTC+1)	Try: Isabel Marti 10' c Alba Rubial 17' c Inês Spinola 39' m Mariana Romero 60' c Con: Ana Iglesias 11'; Hannah Smid (2) 18', 61'; Cards: Elsa Porto (yellow card) 55'; Judith Hernández (yellow card) 75'		Try: Gael Albesa 30' m	Referee: David Joaquín Castro Muñiz (RFER)

=== Round 9 ===
22 February 2025	CRAT Residencia Rialta	19–28	Complutense Cisneros	Elviña, A Coruña
15:00 CET (UTC+1)	Try: Elsa Porto 21' c Linneke Gevers 31' m Isabel Marti 70' c Con: Hannah Smid (2) 21', 70'		Try: Candela Cembrano 26' m Victoria Rosell 36' m Claudia Araujo 43' m Iratxe Aramburu 79' c Con: Candela Cembrano 80'; Pen: Candela Cembrano (2) 54', 58'; Cards: Sofía Ayuso (yellow card) 68'	Attendance: 150; Referee: José Luis Murillo García-Gil (RFER)

23 February 2025	Social Energy AVRFCB	12–23	Getxo	La Teixonera, Barcelona
12:00 CET (UTC+1)	Try: Anna Camarassa 7' c Elena Comadran 19' m Con: Martina Campoy 8'; Cards: Gemma Silva (yellow card) 65'		Try: Garazi Goikolea (2) 36' m, 62' m Alba de la Cruz 39' m Iciar Pozo 48' m Pen: Naroa Azpitarte 15'	Attendance: 69; Referee: Jorge Sáez Domínguez (RFER)

23 February 2025	Simón Verde Magnolia Cocos	21–45	Colina Clinic El Salvador (TBP)	La Cartuja, Seville
12:30 CET (UTC+1)	Try: Lea Ducher 58' c Ana Peralta 73' c Marta Carmona 80' c Con: Carolina Fernanda Alfaro (3) 59', 74', 80'		Try: Matilda Toca (2) 5' c, 8' c María Miguel (2) 40' m, 48' c Beatriz Rivera 45' c Amaia Fabo 65' m Alba Alpín 77' c Con: Bingbing Vergara (5) 6', 9', 46', 49', 78'; Cards: Julia Navarro (yellow card) 79'	Referee: Alfonso Mirat Serván (RFER)

23 February 2025	(DBP) Sant Cugat	10–13	Silicius Majadahonda	ZEM La Guinardera, Sant Cugat del Vallès
13:30 CET (UTC+1)	Try: Meritxell Tur 62' m Mireia García 76' m Cards: Maitane Ibáñez (yellow card) 39'		Try: Eva Aguirre 13' m María Arzuaga 79' m Pen: María Arzuaga 11'; Cards: Lucía Calvo (yellow card) 46'	Referee: Eki Fanlo Antzin (RFER)

=== Round 10 ===
1 March 2025	(TBP) Complutense Cisneros	29–7	Social Energy AVRFCB	Campo Central CIU, Madrid
14:00 CET (UTC+1)	Try: Sonia Montero 15' m Aiora Hijarrubia 22' m Ingrid Algar (2) 38' c, 44' c Zahía Pérez 50' m Con: Sonia Montero 39'; Candela Cembrano 45'		Try: Sara Mendavia 73' c Con: Irene Real 74'	Attendance: 62; Referee: Jenny Lee (RFER)

1 March 2025	Silicius Majadahonda	16–15	Simón Verde Magnolia Cocos (DBP)	Valle del Arcipreste, Majadahonda
14:00 CET (UTC+1)	Try: Eva Aguirre 62' m Alicia Guío 72' m Pen: Chloë Arroyo 9'; Martina Márquez 19'		Try: Araceli Baena 47' c Marieta Román 77' m Con: Carolina Fernanda Alfaro 48'; Pen: Carolina Fernanda Alfaro 16'; Cards: Martina Fernández (yellow card) 7'; Laura Muñiz (yellow card) 27'; Valle Viñas (yellow card) 71'	Referee: David Joaquín Castro Muñiz (RFER)

2 March 2025	Sant Cugat	24–21	Colina Clinic El Salvador (DBP)	ZEM La Guinardera, Sant Cugat del Vallès
11:00 CET (UTC+1)	Try: Ana Harris 22' m Marina García 26' c Martina Benito 32' c Mireia García 49' m Con: Inés Bueso-Inchausti (2) 27', 33'		Try: Tecla Masoko 35' c Ángela Diez 44' c María Miguel 61' c Con: Alba Alpín (3) 36', 45', 62'	Attendance: 159; Referee: Lorena Martínez Fernández (RFER)

2 March 2025	Getxo	17–29	CRAT Residencia Rialta	Polideportivo Fadura, Getxo
12:30 CET (UTC+1)	Try: Iciar Pozo 3' m Garazi Goikolea 9' m Keyla Rivera 75' c Con: Naroa Azpitarte 75'; Cards: Garazi Goikolea (yellow card) 37'		Try: Linneke Gevers 6' c Luxora Suárez 21' c Isabel Marti 35' c Iria Anidos 40' m Con: Hannah Smid (3) 6', 21', 35'; Pen: Hannah Smid 15'; Cards: Elsa Porto (yellow card) 47'	Attendance: 164; Referee: José Luis Murillo García-Gil (RFER)

== Relegation playoff ==
25 May 2025	CRAT Residencia Rialta	29–5	Eibar RT	Complejo Deportivo Las Mestas, Gijón
12:00 CEST (UTC+2)	Try: Judith Hernández 19' m Isabel Marti 26' m Idaira García 39' m Penalty Try 62'; Hannah Smid 67' c Con: Hannah Smid 68'; Cards: Judith Hernández (yellow card) 29'; Alba Rubial (yellow card) 49'; Alicia San Martín (red card) 32'		Try: Florencia Marin 58' m Cards: Maddi Sola (yellow card) 62'	Referee: David Joaquín Castro Muñiz (RFER)

== Play-offs ==
Quarter-finals
4	Sant Cugat	41
5	Getxo	24
3	Simón Verde Magnolia Cocos	27
6	Complutense Cisneros	20

Semi-finals
1	Colina Clinic El Salvador	72
4	Sant Cugat	0
2	Silicius Majadahonda	32
3	Simón Verde Magnolia Cocos	17

Final
1	Colina Clinic El Salvador	31
2	Silicius Majadahonda	12

=== Quarter-finals ===
26 April 2025	Simón Verde Magnolia Cocos	27–20	Complutense Cisneros	La Cartuja, Seville
16:00 CEST (UTC+2)	Try: Marieta Román 17' c Marta Carmona 33' m Ana Peralta 41' m Carolina Fernanda Alfaro 59' c Con: Carolina Fernanda Alfaro (2) 17', 59'; Pen: Carolina Fernanda Alfaro 65'		Try: Alba María Alonso 2' m Candela Cembrano (2) 8' c, 74' m Con: Zahía Pérez 8'; Pen: Candela Cembrano 62'	Referee: Daniel Sarrión García (RFER)

27 April 2025	Sant Cugat	41–24	Getxo RT	ZEM La Guinardera, Sant Cugat del Vallès
12:00 CEST (UTC+2)	Try: Irene Aires 7' m Mireia García (3) 13' m, 30' m, 39' c Mireia de Andrés 27' c Sara Marín 57' c Berta Gimeno 75' m Con: Inés Bueso-Inchausti (3) 28', 40', 58'; Cards: Laia Azorín (yellow card) 68'		Try: Luisina Contreras (2) 35' c, 80' m Leyre Bianchi 50' m Luna Arroyo 62' c Con: Naroa Azpitarte (2) 36', 63'; Cards: Leyre Bianchi (yellow card) 26'	Attendance: 223; Referee: Álvaro García de las Mestas García (RFER)

=== Semi-finals ===
3 May 2025	Silicius Majadahonda	32–17	Simón Verde Magnolia Cocos	Valle del Arcipreste, Majadahonda
16:00 CEST (UTC+2)	Try: Carlota Caicoya (2) 12' c, 56' c Alicia Guío 33' c Eva Aguirre 52' m Con: Carlota Caicoya (3) 12', 33', 56'; Pen: Carlota Caicoya (2) 2', 6'		Try: Cecilia Benza 40' c Ana Peralta 59' m Florencia Moreno 79' m Con: Carolina Fernanda Alfaro 40'	Attendance: 200; Referee: Lorena Martínez Fernández (RFER)

4 May 2025	Colina Clinic El Salvador	72–0	Sant Cugat	Estadio Pepe Rojo, Valladolid
11:00 CEST (UTC+2)	Try: Bingbing Vergara (2) 4' m, 48' c Amaia Fabo 9' c María Miguel 20' c Tecla Masoko 26' m Inés Antolínez 42' m Kiara Espósito 51' c Belsay Escudero 56' c Ángela Diez 62' c Carla Méndez 75' m Nerea García 79' c Con: Bingbing Vergara (6) 10', 21', 49', 52', 57', 63'; Alba Alpín 80'; Pen: Bingbing Vergara 40'		Cards: Berta Gimeno (yellow card) 42'	Referee: Jenny Lee (RFER)

=== Final ===
18 May 2025	Colina Clinic El Salvador	31–12	Silicius Majadahonda	Estadio Pepe Rojo, Valladolid
12:00 CEST (UTC+2)	Try: Brianna Wallace 17' c Bingbing Vergara 32' c María Miguel 45' c Jimena Torres 71' c Con: Bingbing Vergara (4) 18', 33', 45', 71'; Pen: Bingbing Vergara 24'; Cards: Tecla Masoko (yellow card) 27'; Carmen Martos (yellow card) 74'		Try: Martina Márquez 40' c Marta Estellés 67' m Con: María Arzuaga 40'	Referee: David Joaquín Castro Muñiz (RFER)

== Leading scorers ==
=== Most points ===
Rank	Player	Club	Points
1	(Spain) María Miguel	Colina Clinic El Salvador	115
2	(Spain) Bingbing Vergara	Colina Clinic El Salvador	111
3	(Chile) Carolina Fernanda Alfaro	Simón Verde Magnolia Cocos	72
4	(Spain) Naroa Azpitarte	Getxo	63
5	(Spain) Tecla Masoko	Colina Clinic El Salvador	60
6	(Spain) Garazi Goikolea	Getxo	45
7	(Spain) Carlota Caicoya	Silicius Majadahonda	44
8	(Spain) Martina Márquez	Silicius Majadahonda	42
9	(Netherlands) Hannah Smid	CRAT Residencia RIALTA	41
10	(Spain) Mireia García	Sant Cugat	40

=== Most tries ===
Rank	Player	Club	Tries
1	(Spain) María Miguel	Colina Clinic El Salvador	23
2	(Spain) Tecla Masoko	Colina Clinic El Salvador	12
3	(Spain) Garazi Goikolea	Getxo	9
4	(Spain) Mireia García	Sant Cugat	8
5	(Spain) Ana Peralta	Simón Verde Magnolia Cocos	7
5	(Spain) Eva Aguirre	Silicius Majadahonda	7
5	(Spain) Marieta Román	Simón Verde Magnolia Cocos	7
5	(Spain) Marta Carmona	Simón Verde Magnolia Cocos	7
9	(Spain) Carlota Caicoya	Silicius Majadahonda	6

== Super Cup ==
III Supercopa Iberdrola de Rugby
- Countries: Spain
- Number of teams: 2
- Date: 15 September 2024
- Champions: Silicius Majadahonda (3rd title)
- Runners-up: CRAT Residencia RIALTA
- Matches played: 1
- Tries scored: 9 (average 9 per match)

On August 21, the Spanish Rugby Federation announced the third edition of the Supercup was to be played as a single match at the beginning of the season.

15 September 2024	Silicius Majadahonda	41–12	CRAT Residencia RIALTA	Estadio Yago Lamela, Avilés
13:00 CEST (UTC+2)	Try: Denisse Gortázar Valverde (2) 3' m, 32' c Abril Martín De La Calle (2) 6' m, 47' c Isabelle María Grisé 28' m Carmen Rodera Leguey 50' c Marta Ferrandiz Lefler 73' m Con: Isabelle María Grisé (3) 33', 48', 51'		Try: Maitane Buján Gómez 24' m Hannah Thyra Smid 64' c Con: Ana Iglesias Sobrino 65'	Referee: Jenny Lee (RFER)

== Queen's Cup ==
2024–25 Queen's Cup
- Countries: Spain
- Number of teams: 16
- Date: 21 September 2024 –
- Champions: El Salvador (1st title)
- Runners-up: Sant Cugat
- Matches played: 27
- Tries scored: 234 (average 8.7 per match)

On 29 July 2024, the Spanish Rugby Federation announced the RFER Cup would be now called the Queen's Cup and its calendar. The competition will be played in preseason and during the 2025 Rugby Europe Women's Championship window and, like the previous year, will see the 16 teams of the two top categories split in 4 regional pools. Every team will play once against the other 3 in their pool, and the winner of each one will classify for the semi-finals.

=== Pool A ===
Pos	Team	P	W	D	L	PF	PA	PD	TF	TA	TD	TBP	DBP	Pts
1	CRAT Residencia Rialta	3	3	0	0	93	41	52	15	7	8	2	0	14
2	Getxo	3	2	0	1	102	50	52	18	8	10	2	1	11
3	Eibar RT	3	1	0	2	72	75	-3	12	13	-1	1	0	5
4	PRB Flor de Escocia UBU	3	0	0	3	31	132	-101	5	22	-17	0	0	0
First qualify for semi-finals.

==== Round 1 ====
21 September 2024	(TBP) Eibar RT	46–12	PRB Flor de Escocia UBU	Unbe, Eibar
16:00 CEST (UTC+2)	Try: Oihane Lopez De Ullibarri Torrado (4) 5' m, 39' m, 53' m, 77' m Malen Esparza Azcune 11' c Naia Goiriena 30' m Iraide Toyos Marzo 69' c Leire Markiegi Gortazar 79' c Con: Lorea Mar Barrutia (3) 12', 70', 80'		Try: Laura Maestro García (2) 35' c, 58' m Con: Laura Maestro García 36'; Cards: Paula Salazar Rocha (yellow card) 71' to end'	Attendance: 100; Referee: David Valdés Gayo (RFER)

22 September 2024	CRAT Residencia Rialta	24–22	Getxo (DBP)	Elviña, A Coruña
12:00 CEST (UTC+2)	Try: Inês Spinola Duarte 25' m Luxora Catalina Azucena Del Suárez Suárez 51' c Idaira García López 63' c María Mercedes Estévez Parada 70' m Con: Ana Iglesias Sobrino (2) 52', 64'; Cards: Alicia San Martín Alonso (yellow card) 28' to 38'		Try: Aiora Jiménez Landeta 21' m Lucía Inés Petraccaro Inchusta 30' c Joana Murray Barandika 37' m June Larrañaga Echevarria 79' m Con: Lucía Inés Petraccaro Inchusta 31'	Referee: David Joaquín Castro Muñiz (RFER)

==== Round 2 ====
29 September 2024	Eibar RT	19–39	Getxo (TBP)	Unbe, Eibar
12:00 CEST (UTC+2)	Try: Adara Alfonso Boubeta 26' c Ane Rincón Madinabeitia 42' c Oihane Lopez De Ullibarri Torrado 58' m Con: Lorea Mar Barrutia (2) 27', 43'		Try: Garazi Goikolea Lopez De Munain (3) 15' m, 20' m, 79' m Aiora Jiménez Landeta 30' c India Benoit Milara 35' c Gorane Madariaga Godoy 48' m Iciar Pozo Eizaguirre 77' m Con: Lucía Inés Petraccaro Inchusta (2) 31', 36'; Cards: June Larrañaga Echevarria (yellow card) 39' to 49'; Jone Etxegia Mardaras (yellow card) 74' to end'	Attendance: 120; Referee: Pablo Pascual Barragán (RFER)

29 September 2024	PRB Flor de Escocia UBU	12–45	CRAT Residencia Rialta (TBP)	Campo de Rugby Bienvenido Nieto, Burgos
12:00 CEST (UTC+2)	Try: Laura Maestro García (2) 35' c, 70' m Con: Laura Maestro García 36'; Cards: Nerea Rodríguez Herrero (yellow card) 9' to 19'		Try: Maitane Buján Gómez 30' c María Mercedes Parada Estévez (2) 39' m, 54' m Idaira García López 44' c Hannah Thyra Smid (2) 47' c, 61' c Alejandra Fernández Maceiras 65' c Con: Ana Iglesias Sobrino (5) 31', 44', 47', 61', 65'	Referee: Alfonso Mirat Serván (RFER)

==== Round 3 ====
13 October 2024	(TBP) CRAT Residencia Rialta	24–7	Eibar RT	Elviña, A Coruña
12:00 CEST (UTC+2)	Try: Alejandra Fernández Maceiras 9' m Idaira García López 17' c Hannah Thyra Smid 62' c Alicia San Martín Alonso 76' m Con: Ana Iglesias Sobrino (2) 18', 63'; Cards: Alba Rubial Lalín (yellow card) 35' to 45'; Ana Iglesias Sobrino (yellow card) 47' to 57'		Try: Lorea Segovia Cincunegui 49' c Con: Lorea Mar Barrutia 50'	Referee: Ignacio Iglesia Poch (RFER)

13 October 2024	(TBP) Getxo	41–7	PRB Flor de Escocia UBU	Polideportivo Fadura, Getxo
12:30 CEST (UTC+2)	Try: Haizea Arco Villar (2) 6' m, 75' m Alba De La Cruz Garrido 12' m Joana Murray Barandika 33' c Garazi Goikolea Lopez De Munain (2) 43' m, 51' c Lucía Inés Petraccaro Inchusta 53' c Con: Lucía Inés Petraccaro Inchusta (3) 34', 52', 54'		Try: Laura Maestro García 68' c Con: Laura Maestro García 69'	Attendance: 123; Referee: Silvia Garrido Ribas (RFER)

=== Pool B ===
Pos	Team	P	W	D	L	PF	PA	PD	TF	TA	TD	TBP	DBP	Pts
1	Sant Cugat	3	2	0	1	60	14	46	10	2	8	2	0	10
2	Turia - Les Abelles	3	2	0	1	56	31	25	5	5	0	2	0	10
3	Social Energy AVRFCB	3	2	0	1	59	26	33	9	1	8	1	0	7 (Note: Round 1 match between Turia and AVRFCB was awarded as a 21-0 bonus win for Turia after AVRFCB didn't show up. AVRFCB also received an extra 2 points deduction.)
4	UE Santboiana	3	0	0	3	12	116	-104	2	18	-16	0	0	0
First qualify for semi-finals.

==== Round 1 ====
21 September 2024	(TBP) Turia - Les Abelles	HWO; 21–0	Social Energy AVRFCB	Poliesportiu Quatre Carreres, Valencia
15:30 CEST (UTC+2)				Referee: Luis Fernández Díaz (RFER)

21 September 2024	(TBP) Sant Cugat	36–0	UE Santboiana	ZEM La Guinardera, Sant Cugat del Vallès
16:00 CEST (UTC+2)	Try: Berta Gimeno Santesmases 24' m Marina García Mota 33' c Alexia Gasco Amoros 38' c Sara Marín i Puyuelo 57' c Mireia García Santiago 59' m Paula Xutglà Reixach 77' m Con: Zoé Marie Elise Bastide (3) 34', 39', 58'			Attendance: 200; Referee: Roger Parera Villacampa (RFER)

==== Round 2 ====
28 September 2024	Turia - Les Abelles	0–19	Sant Cugat (TBP)	Poliesportiu Quatre Carreres, Valencia
15:00 CEST (UTC+2)	Cards: Maribel Mestra Díaz (yellow card) 78' to end'		Try: Berta Gimeno Santesmases 14' m Mireia García Santiago (2) 32' c, 80' c Con: Zoé Marie Elise Bastide (2) 33', 80'	Attendance: 100; Referee: Juan José López Torres (RFER)

19 October 2024	(TBP) Social Energy AVRFCB	45–0 (Note: Match stopped after 27 minutes for player safety after Santboiana, that started with 12 players, suffered numerous injuries.)	UE Santboiana	La Teixonera, Barcelona
21:00 CEST (UTC+2)	Try: María Eugenia Cruces Barrios (2) 3' c, 12' c Shara Benedicte Dimi Ngayo (4) 5' m, 18' c, 23' c, 27' m Paula Garzón Osorio 10' c Con: Sara Rodríguez Berdún (5) 4', 11', 13', 18', 24'; Cards: Martina Campoy Villar (yellow card) 17' to 27'			Referee: Lluís Llauger Suau (RFER)

==== Round 3 ====
12 October 2024	UE Santboiana	12–35	Turia - Les Abelles (TBP)	Estadi Baldiri Aleu, Sant Boi de Llobregat
16:00 CEST (UTC+2)	Try: Mariona Ventura Romero 19' c Érika Beltrán Bujalance 69' m Con: Leire Aguilar Gil 20'		Try: Camila Lopera 22' c, 32' c Maribel Mestra Díaz 38' m Camila Soledad Ríos 40' m Marina Rodríguez Alvarruiz 62'; Con: Alejandra Marina Romay (2) 23', 33'; Pen: Alejandra Marina Romay (2) 8', 48'	Attendance: 250; Referee: Francisco Jesús Gázquez Bendicho (RFER)

12 October 2024	Sant Cugat	5–14	Social Energy AVRFCB	ZEM La Guinardera, Sant Cugat del Vallès
18:00 CEST (UTC+2)	Try: Lara Cook Ballester 22' m		Try: Paula Garzón Osorio 28' c Gaïa Tartinville Bruant 54' c Con: Sara Rodríguez Berdún (2) 29', 55'; Cards: Martina Campoy Villar (yellow card) 76' to end'	Referee: Lluís Llauger Suau (RFER)

=== Pool C ===
Pos	Team	P	W	D	L	PF	PA	PD	TF	TA	TD	TBP	DBP	Pts
1	El Salvador	3	3	0	0	202	25	177	34	3	31	3	0	15
2	Complutense Cisneros	3	2	0	1	162	53	109	24	9	15	2	0	10
3	Olímpico de Pozuelo	3	1	0	2	37	136	-99	7	22	-15	1	0	5
4	CEFA-Unizar	3	0	0	3	3	190	-187	0	31	-31	0	0	0
First qualify for semi-finals.

==== Round 1 ====
21 September 2024	(TBP) El Salvador	81–5	Olímpico de Pozuelo	Estadio Pepe Rojo, Valladolid
17:00 CEST (UTC+2)	Try: Amaia Fabo Pérez 8' m María Miguel Gil 14' c Alba Alpín Bardaji 17' c Jimena Torres Eleno 23' c Beatriz Rivera Zapatero 29' m Belsay Escudero López 33' m Saray Avilés Alcoba 39' m Carla Méndez Vázquez 50' c África Vilchez Peinado (2) 55' c, 63' m Matilda Toca Altes 70' c Elisa Castro Camarero 75' c Belén Castellano Hernández 79' c Con: Alba Alpín Bardaji (3) 15', 18', 24'; Ariadna Bingbing Vergara Piqueras (5) 51', 56', 71', 76', 80'		Try: Raquel Bermejo Manteca 2' m	Attendance: 101; Referee: Jon Ibisate Alday (RFER)

21 September 2024	(TBP) Complutense Cisneros	90–0	CEFA-Unizar	Campo Central CIU, Madrid
17:00 CEST (UTC+2)	Try: María de Lluc Bonet Seguí (2) 2' c, 55' c Aiora Hijarrubia Lanau 6' m Lucía Malagón Sánchez (2) 12' c, 17' c Margarita Blanco Esquivel 20' c Elena Irache Aracil 33' c Gema García Mecández 37' c Aiora Hijarrubia Lanau 45' c Iratxe Aramburu Barreiro (4) 52' c, 62' m, 67' c, 71' c Con: Elisa Álvarez Yuste (11) 3', 13', 17', 21', 34', 37', 46', 53', 56', 67', 71'; Pen: Elisa Álvarez Yuste 30'		Cards: Ametsa Ulibarri Pérez de Nanclares (red card) 50'	Referee: Joaquín Santoro Ferreiro (RFER)

==== Round 2 ====
28 September 2024	CEFA-Unizar	3–68	El Salvador (TBP)	Centro Deportivo Municipal David Cañada, Zaragoza
17:00 CEST (UTC+2)	Pen: Marta Pamplona De Uña 77'		Try: María Del Carmen Martos Cuesta 7' m Saray Avilés Alcoba (3) 12' m, 30' m, 35' m Irene Alonso Pinilla (3) 15' m, 19' m, 26' c Matilda Toca Altes 23' c Amaia Fabo Pérez (2) 46' m, 65' c África Vilchez Peinado 50' c Claudia de la Loma Dehesa 79' m Con: Alba Alpín Bardaji (3) 24', 27', 51'; Ariadna Bingbing Vergara Piqueras 66'	Attendance: 101; Referee: Carlos Guerrero Padín (RFER)

28 September 2024	Olímpico de Pozuelo	0–55	Complutense Cisneros (TBP)	Valle de las Cañas, Pozuelo de Alarcón
19:00 CEST (UTC+2)	Cards: Blanca Martinez Bueno (yellow card) 73' to end'		Try: Aiora Hijarrubia Lanau 5' c Elena Amo Cortés (2) 12' c, 79' m Lourdes Novillo Lucas-Vaquero 23' m Elena Irache Aracil 25' c Inas El Ammouri Ruiz 31' c Elisa Álvarez Yuste 60' c Ingrid Algar González (2) 64' m, 67' m Con: Elisa Álvarez Yuste (5) 6', 13', 25', 32', 61'	Attendance: 72; Referee: Telmo Jesús Avalle Morales (RFER)

==== Round 3 ====
13 October 2024	(TBP) El Salvador	53–17	Complutense Cisneros	Estadio Pepe Rojo, Valladolid
11:00 CEST (UTC+2)	Try: María Miguel Gil (2) 4' m, 43' m Carla Méndez Vázquez 15' c Beatriz Rivera Zapatero (2) 28' m, 58' c Elisa Castro Camarero (2) 50' c, 54' c Tecla Masoko Bueriberi (2) 62' m, 71' m Con: Alba Alpín Bardaji (4) 16', 51', 55', 59'		Try: Ingrid Algar González (2) 10' c, 76' c Con: Elisa Álvarez Yuste 11'; María de Lluc Bonet Seguí 77'; Pen: Elisa Álvarez Yuste 7'	Attendance: 300; Referee: Santiago Castro Villar (RFER)

13 October 2024	CEFA-Unizar	0–32	Olímpico de Pozuelo (TBP)	Centro Deportivo Municipal David Cañada, Zaragoza
13:00 CEST (UTC+2)			Try: Elena Milagros Jiménez Salguero 19' m Sara María Deygas Sirvent 23' m Núria López Moll 48' m Blanca Barriuso González 53' m Miriam Vega Tocino 64' m Steffi Frances Hooson 73' c Con: Elena Milagros Jiménez Salguero 74'	Referee: Alejandro Jiménez Carrasco (RFER)

=== Pool D ===
Pos	Team	P	W	D	L	PF	PA	PD	TF	TA	TD	TBP	DBP	Pts
1	Simón Verde Magnolia Cocos	3	3	0	0	138	17	121	21	3	18	3	0	15
2	Silicius Majadahonda	3	2	0	1	114	40	74	20	6	14	2	0	10
3	Atlético Portuense	3	1	0	2	75	82	-7	12	14	-2	1	0	5
4	Jabatas Móstoles RC	3	0	0	3	25	213	-188	5	35	-30	0	0	0
First qualify for semi-finals.

==== Round 1 ====
21 September 2024	(TBP) Silicius Majadahonda	75–5	Jabatas Móstoles RC	Valle del Arcipreste, Majadahonda
12:30 CEST (UTC+2)	Try: Vico Gorrochategui Juste (3) 1' c, 16' c, 36' c Luisa Pérez Pérez 11' m Ruth Arroyo Escorial 15' m Celia Palumbo Ribot (2) 22' m, 27' m Rocío Tenoiro Lara 41' m Patricia Alexandre González 42' m Marta Ferrandiz Lefler (2) 55' c, 74' m Luisina Contreras (2) 62' c, 68' m Con: Idaira Morales Cabrera (5) 2', 17', 37', 56', 63'		Try: Inés Paterna Benito 78' m Cards: Marta Tejedo Cerrato (yellow card) 49' to 59'	Attendance: 56; Referee: Elena Mora Serrano (RFER)

21 September 2024	Atlético Portuense	0–40	Simón Verde Magnolia Cocos (TBP)	Ciudad Deportiva Municipal Rafael Sánchez, El Puerto de Santa María
18:30 CEST (UTC+2)	Cards: Sabela Díaz Rodríguez (yellow card) 70' to end'		Try: Maria Cecilia Benza Morales 8' m Blanca Ruiz Cabrero 12' c Concha Moreno Pérez 34' c Valle Viñas Moure (2) 65' m, 79' c Ana Peralta Baquet 71' c Con: Carolina Fernanda Alfaro (3) 13', 19', 34'; Blanca Ruiz Cabrero (2) 72', 80'	Referee: Eduardo Cousillas Álvarez (RFER)

==== Round 2 ====
28 September 2024	(TBP) Simón Verde Magnolia Cocos	27–7	Silicius Majadahonda	La Cartuja, Seville
17:00 CEST (UTC+2)	Try: Kasandra Sylla Rodríguez 1' c María Estepa Navarro (2) 21' m, 40' m Laura Muñiz Fernández 67' c Con: Carolina Fernanda Alfaro (2) 2', 67'; Drop: Carolina Fernanda Alfaro 16'		Try: Luisina Contreras 28' c Con: Luisina Contreras 29'	Attendance: 253; Referee: Lorena Martínez Fernández (RFER)

29 September 2024	(TBP) Atlético Portuense	67–10	Jabatas Móstoles RC	Ciudad Deportiva Municipal Rafael Sánchez, El Puerto de Santa María
12:00 CEST (UTC+2)	Try: María Castellano Bernal (3) 1' c, 11' c, 30' m María Martínez Carretero 4' m Ana García Agrela 22' m Sabela Díaz Rodríguez 33' c Blanca Delgado Pérez 39' c Paula Ruiz Madrid (2) 52' m, 61' m Valle Pérez Rodríguez (2) 70' c, 79' c Con: Blanca Delgado Pérez (6) 2', 12', 34', 40', 71', 80'; Cards: Lola Icíar Pavía Gómez (yellow card) 28' to 38'; Camila Fantacone (yellow card) 79' to end'		Try: Elisa García Herrero (2) 27' m, 46' m	Referee: Juan María Escudero Abenza (RFER)

==== Round 3 ====
13 October 2024	(TBP) Silicius Majadahonda	32–8	Atlético Portuense	Valle del Arcipreste, Majadahonda
12:00 CEST (UTC+2)	Try: Cayetana Álvarez Serrano (2) 16' m, 43' m Luisa Pérez Pérez (2) 36' m, 63' m Marta Fresno Jimenez 68' c Valentina Maldonado Jaimes 78' m Con: Idaira Morales Cabrera 69'; Cards: Luisina Contreras (yellow card) 40' to 50'		Try: Paula Ruiz Madrid 23' m Pen: Blanca Delgado Pérez 77'	Attendance: 100; Referee: Isaac Pujol Pasanau (RFER)

13 October 2024	Jabatas Móstoles RC	10–71	Simón Verde Magnolia Cocos (TBP)	Puerta de Hierro, Madrid
13:00 CEST (UTC+2)	Try: Marta Cardiel Fernández 30' m Mara Sofía Cepeda Zapata 80' m		Try: Marta Carmona Pérez (2) 1' m, 52' m Ana Peralta Baquet 7' c Miriam Roig González 25' c Ana Caravaca Humanes 39' c Blanca Ruiz Cabrero (2) 46' c, 59' c María Estepa Navarro (2) 55' m, 78' c María Montero Chozas 63' c Laura Muñiz Fernández 75' c Con: Carolina Fernanda Alfaro (8) 8', 26', 40', 47', 60', 64', 76', 79'	Referee: Félix Villegas Casado (RFER)

=== Play-offs ===
Semi-finals
1	Colina Clinic El Salvador	80
4	CRAT Residencia Rialta	5
3	Sant Cugat	45
2	Simón Verde Magnolia Cocos	33

Final
Colina Clinic El Salvador	57
Sant Cugat	5

==== Semi-finals ====
The semi-finals draw was announced on 28 November 2024.

8 March 2025	Sant Cugat	45–33	Simón Verde Magnolia Cocos	ZEM La Guinardera, Sant Cugat del Vallès
16:00 CET (UTC+1)	Try: Mireia García (3) 16' c, 25' c, 54' m Gina Navarro 21' c Marina García 43' c Lara Cook 69' m Martina Benito 72' c Con: Inés Bueso-Inchausti (5) 17', 22', 26', 43', 73'		Try: Claudia Sánchez 8' m Marieta Román 13' c Carolina Fernanda Alfaro, 28' c Marta Carmona 49' c Cecilia Benza 75' c Con: Carolina Fernanda Alfaro (4) 14', 29', 50', 76'	Referee: Joaquín Santoro Ferreiro (RFER)

9 March 2025	El Salvador	80–5	CRAT Residencia Rialta	Estadio Pepe Rojo, Valladolid
12:00 CET (UTC+1)	Try: Carla Villegas (3) 2' c, 16' m, 59' c Penalty Try 6'; Ángela Diez (3) 20' c, 35' c, 39' c Carla Méndez (2) 24' c, 41' m Nerea García (2) 27' c, 73' c Amaia Fabo 61' m Con: Bingbing Vergara (6) 2', 20', 24', 27', 35', 40', 42'; Alba Alpín (2) 59', 73'		Try: Idaira García 66' m Cards: Victoria Arroyo (yellow card) 6'	Referee: Federico Javier Japas (RFER)

==== Final ====
15 March 2025	El Salvador	57–5	Sant Cugat	Las Terrazas, Madrid
16:00 CET (UTC+1)	Try: Bingbing Vergara (2) 2' m, 78' c Beatriz Rivera 6' c María Miguel (4) 9' c, 15' c, 27' m, 34' m Matilda Toca 29' c Inés Antolínez 46' c Con: Bingbing Vergara (6) 7', 10', 16', 30', 47', 79'		Try: Ana Harris 51' m	Referee: Jenny Lee (RFER)
