= 2023–24 Liga Iberdrola de Rugby =

- Countries: Spain
- Number of teams: 8
- Date: 12 November 2023 – 18 May 2024
- Champions: Silicius Majadahonda (4th title)
- Runners-up: CRAT Residencia Rialta
- Relegated: Olímpico de Pozuelo; Eibar RT
- Matches played: 45
- Tries scored: 259 (average 5.8 per match)
- Top point scorer: (Spain) Claudia Peña (AVR FC Barcelona) – 151 points
- Top try scorer: (Spain) Claudia Peña (AVR FC Barcelona) – 13 tries

Official website
- resultadosrugby.isquad.es/clasificacion.php?id_competicion=27

The 2023–24 Liga Iberdrola de Rugby was the 14th season of the Liga Iberdrola de Rugby, the top flight of Spanish domestic women's rugby union competition and the 8th to be sponsored by Iberdrola. The reigning champions entering the season where Majadahonda who claimed their 3rd league title after winning the 2022-23 final against Corteva Cocos.

== Teams ==
2023–24 Liga Iberdrola de Rugby Teams

Eight teams compete in the league – the top seven teams from the previous season and AVR FC Barcelona who were promoted as champions of the 2022–23 Honor Division B. They replaced Complutense Cisneros who were relegated after six years in the top flight.

Team	Captain	Head coach	Stadium	Capacity	City
(Community of Madrid) AVR FC Barcelona	Annia Segarra Romeu	Daniel Ripol Fortuny	La Teixonera	240	Barcelona
(Galicia (Spain)) CRAT Residencia RIALTA	Alba Rubial Lalín	Pablo Artime Muñiz	Elviña	1500	A Coruña
(Castile and León) Crealia El Salvador	Inés Antolínez Fernández	Michael Walker-Fitton	Estadio Pepe Rojo	2500	Valladolid
(Basque Country (autonomous community)) Eibar Rugby Taldea	Nerea García Rementería	María Cristina Guntín Miranda	Unbe	600	Éibar
(Andalusia) Ghenova Cocos	Julia Castro Camino	Garry Owen; Álvaro Alberto Moreno Gallardo	La Cartuja	1932	Sevilla
(Community of Madrid) Olímpico de Pozuelo	Miriam Vega Tocino	Daniel Mingo Martínez	Valle de las Cañas	300	Pozuelo de Alarcón
(Catalonia) Sant Cugat	Sara Marín i Puyuelo	Albert Casorrán Baró	ZEM La Guinardera	500	Sant Cugat del Vallès
(Community of Madrid) Silicius Majadahonda	Lucía Díaz Martín	Xabier Rodríguez Ramírez	Valle del Arcipreste	200	Majadahonda

== Table ==
Pos	Team	P	W	D	L	PF	PA	PD	TF	TA	TD	TBP	DBP	Pts
1	Silicius Majadahonda	10	8	0	2	297	144	153	44	19	25	4	1	37
2	CRAT Residencia Rialta	10	7	1	2	249	144	105	39	20	19	4	1	35
3	Crealia El Salvador	10	6	0	4	251	127	124	38	18	20	4	3	31
4	Sant Cugat	10	4	1	5	194	275	-81	27	44	-17	1	0	19
5	Ghenova Cocos	10	5	1	4	173	225	-52	25	33	-8	0	1	23
6	AVR FC Barcelona	10	4	0	6	188	150	38	23	22	1	1	4	21
7	Eibar RT	10	2	1	7	104	277	-173	17	40	-23	0	1	11
8	Olímpico de Pozuelo	10	2	0	8	127	241	-114	19	36	-17	0	2	10
First Two are semi-finals places. Third to Sixth are quarter-finals places. Second to last plays a relegation playoff against Honor Division B runner-up. Last placed relegated to Honor Division B..

== Regular season ==
Fixtures for the season were announced by the Spanish Rugby Federation on 16 August 2023. This season will use a new competition format. Every team will play each other once. Then the teams are split into 2 groups. Group A comprises the first 4 placed and Group B the 4 last. Teams play again against the others on their group, thus reaching a total of 10 rounds. The schedule for the second phase of the regular season was announced by the Spanish Rugby Federation on 6 February 2024.

=== Round 1 ===
11 November 2023	CRAT Residencia Rialta	25–14	Sant Cugat	Elviña, A Coruña
16:00 CET (UTC+1)	Try: Inês Spinola Duarte (2) 14' m, 38' m Mariana Carolina Romero Pérez (2) 40' m, 43' c Con: Ana Iglesias Sobrino 43'; Pen: Ana Iglesias Sobrino 35'; Cards: Divina Leis Quintela (yellow card) 60' to 70'; Judit Hernández Modino (yellow card) 72' to end'		Try: Marina García Mota 23' c Carla Isabel Arca García 80' c Con: Zoé Marie Elise Bastide (2) 23', 80'	Referee: David Joaquín Castro Muñiz (FER)

11 November 2023	AVR FC Barcelona	21–17	Silicius Majadahonda (DBP)	La Teixonera, Barcelona
16:15 CET (UTC+1)	Try: Mercè Viñals Españó 33' m Claudia Peña 50' c Con: Claudia Peña 51'; Pen: Claudia Peña (3) 38', 68', 75'		Try: Jimena Blanco-Hortiguera Pedrero 28' m Alicia Guío Pertíñez 40' m Luisina Contreras 53' c Con: Zahia Pérez Wilhelm 54'; Cards: Irene Garrido Peinado (yellow card) 49' to 59'; Diana Carolina Guerrero Hernández (yellow card) 70' to end'	Referee: Luis Lasala de la Rosa (FER)

12 November 2023	Olímpico de Pozuelo	17–15	Crealia El Salvador (DBP)	Valle de las Cañas, Pozuelo de Alarcón
11:00 CET (UTC+1)	Try: Sidorella Bracic Rodríguez 57' c Lia Piñeiro Gómez 79' c Con: Blanca Silvia Martín Bocos (2) 58', 80'; Pen: Blanca Silvia Martín Bocos 46'		Try: Irene Alonso Pinilla 26' m María Miguel Gil 50' c Con: Alba Alpín Bardaji 51'; Pen: Alba Alpín Bardaji 40'	Attendance: 400; Referee: Roger Parera Villacampa (FER)

12 November 2023	Eibar RT	22–37	Ghenova Cocos	Unbe, Eibar
12:30 CET (UTC+1)	Try: Oihane Lopez De Ullibarri Torrado 9' m Jessica Nugent 68' m Penalty Try 76'; Águeda Pis Arnaiz 79' m		Try: Nicole Francesca Cerulli 21' m Laura Muñiz Fernández 27' m Julia Castro Camino (2) 32' c, 71' c Tisera Samantha Volkman 47' c Con: Carolina Fernanda Alfaro (3) 33', 48', 72'; Pen: Carolina Fernanda Alfaro (2) 40', 51'; Cards: María Del Carmen Fernández Delgado (yellow card) 76' to end'	Attendance: 400; Referee: José Luis Murillo García-Gil (FER)

=== Round 2 ===
25 November 2023	(TBP) Sant Cugat	37–17	Olímpico de Pozuelo	ZEM La Guinardera, Sant Cugat del Vallès
16:00 CET (UTC+1)	Try: Beatriz González González 23' c Alysha Cera Stone (3) 34' m, 40' m, 57' c Marina García Mota 50' m Natalia Gómez Alberich 70' m Con: Zoé Marie Elise Bastide (2) 24', 58'; Pen: Zoé Marie Elise Bastide 18'; Cards: Maitane Ibáñez Sole (yellow card) 80' to end'		Try: Steffi Frances Hooson 67' m Beatriz Baraia-Etxaburu Astigarraga (2) 78' c, 80' m Con: Blanca Silvia Martín Bocos 79'; Cards: Blanca Silvia Martín Bocos (yellow card) 49' to 59'; Beatriz Baraia-Etxaburu Astigarraga (yellow card) 73' to end'	Attendance: 300; Referee: Eduard Martin Serralta (FER)

25 November 2023	Ghenova Cocos	20–18	AVR FC Barcelona (DBP)	La Cartuja, Seville
16:00 CET (UTC+1)	Try: Tonya Jayne Wessman 6' m Ana Peralta Baquet 29' m Tisera Samantha Volkman 75' c Con: Carolina Fernanda Alfaro 75'; Pen: Carolina Fernanda Alfaro 80'		Try: Claudia Peña (2) 57' c, 79' m Con: Claudia Peña 57'; Pen: Claudia Peña (2) 14', 54'	Attendance: 203; Referee: Tatiana Yunta Monje (FER)

26 November 2023	(TBP) Crealia El Salvador	29–0	Eibar RT	Estadio Pepe Rojo, Valladolid
11:00 CET (UTC+1)	Try: María Miguel Gil (2) 2' m, 5' c Tecla Masoko Bueriberi (3) 36' c, 54' m, 65' m Con: Alba Alpín Bardaji (2) 5', 36'; Cards: Carla Villegas Mintegui (yellow card) 76' to end' Saray Avilés Alcoba (yellow card) 80' to end'			Attendance: 5000; Referee: Miguel Fernández Rodríguez (FER)

26 November 2023	Silicius Majadahonda	33–29	CRAT Residencia Rialta (DBP)	Valle del Arcipreste, Majadahonda
12:00 CET (UTC+1)	Try: Denisse Gortázar Valverde 8' c Alba Noa Castellano Cabello 18' c Alicia Guío Pertíñez 30' m Pilar Soria Struch 37' c Macarena Teresa Del Valle Gelineau 48' c Con: Cristina López Calderón (4) 8', 18', 37', 48'		Try: Isabel Martí Montoro (2) 23' c, 55' c Mariana Carolina Romero Pérez 71' m Alejandra Fernández Maceiras 79' c Con: Ana Iglesias Sobrino (3) 23', 55', 79'; Pen: Ana Iglesias Sobrino 4'	Attendance: 463; Referee: Félix Villegas Casado (FER)

=== Round 3 ===
9 December 2023	Eibar RT	12–25	Sant Cugat	Unbe, Eibar
12:30 CET (UTC+1)	Try: Letelemalanuola Fuatino Leafaitulagi Ii Lavea 54' c Rongomaihenga Uenukukoki Waerea-Hohaia 76' m Con: Adara Alfonso Boubeta 55'		Try: Elisabet Segarra Cararach 17' c Martina Benito De Manuel 36' c Ana Harris Martínez 60' m Con: Zoé Marie Elise Bastide (2) 18', 37'; Pen: Zoé Marie Elise Bastide (2) 23', 33'; Cards: Natalia Gómez Alberich (red card) 71'	Attendance: 50; Referee: Luis Fernández Díaz (FER)

9 December 2023	(TBP) Silicius Majadahonda	31–3	Ghenova Cocos	Valle del Arcipreste, Majadahonda
16:00 CET (UTC+1)	Try: Cristina López Calderón (2) 33' c, 75' c Lucía Díaz Martín 52' c Pilar Soria Struch 78' c Con: Cristina López Calderón (4) 33', 52', 75', 78'; Pen: Cristina López Calderón 4'		Pen: Carolina Fernanda Alfaro 36'; Cards: María Estepa Navarro (yellow card) 57' to 67'	Attendance: 200; Referee: Andoni Susperregui Iragorri (FER)

10 December 2023	AVR FC Barcelona	0–19	Crealia El Salvador (TBP)	La Teixonera, Barcelona
12:00 CET (UTC+1)			Try: Ocean Tierney 47' m Carmen Miranda Miralles 64' c Tecla Masoko Bueriberi 73' c Con: Alba Alpín Bardaji (2) 65', 74'; Cards: Ocean Tierney (yellow card) 79' to end'	Referee: Alfonso Mirat Serván (FER)

10 December 2023	(TBP) CRAT Residencia Rialta	32–11	Olímpico de Pozuelo	Elviña, A Coruña
12:00 CET (UTC+1)	Try: Alba Lisandra Martínez Medina (3) 15' m, 33' c, 46' m Judit Hernández Modino 20' m Elsa Porto Vieiros 39' m Mariana Carolina Romero Pérez 79' m Con: Ana Iglesias Sobrino 34'		Try: Irene Schiavón Matteo 59' m Pen: Chiara Pisu Pisu (2) 8', 28'	Referee: David Joaquín Castro Muñiz (FER)

=== Round 4 ===
16 December 2023	(DBP) Olímpico de Pozuelo	17–22	Eibar RT	Valle de las Cañas, Pozuelo de Alarcón
16:30 CET (UTC+1)	Try: Chiara Pisu Pisu (2) 19' c, 72' m Lia Piñeiro Gómez 67' m Con: Chiara Pisu Pisu 20'; Cards: Paloma García de Prado Díaz-Jares (yellow card) 56' to 66'		Try: Letelemalanuola Fuatino Leafaitulagi Ii Lavea 4' m Yamila Alejandra Otero Bures 11' m Jone Carral Zarandona 62' c Jessica Nugent 80' m Con: Adara Alfonso Boubeta 63'; Cards: Iraide Toyos Marzo (yellow card) 49' to 59' (yellow card) 71' (yellow-red card)	Referee: Joaquín Santoro Ferreiro (FER)

16 December 2023	Sant Cugat	18–15	AVR FC Barcelona (DBP)	ZEM La Guinardera, Sant Cugat del Vallès
18:00 CET (UTC+1)	Try: Elisabet Segarra Cararach (2) 43' c, 61' m Con: Zoé Marie Elise Bastide 43'; Pen: Zoé Marie Elise Bastide (2) 39', 40'		Try: Claudia Peña (2) 30' m, 35' c Con: Claudia Peña 36'; Pen: Claudia Peña 3'; Cards: Sara Martori Clara (yellow card) 49' to 59'	Attendance: 300; Referee: Roger Parera Villacampa (FER)

17 December 2023	Ghenova Cocos	5–24	CRAT Residencia Rialta (TBP)	La Cartuja, Seville
11:00 CET (UTC+1)	Try: Nicole Francesca Cerulli 26' m		Try: Alba Lisandra Martínez Medina 12' m Judit Hernández Modino 31' m Inês Spinola Duarte 33' c Cecilia Huarte Sebastian 67' c Con: Ana Iglesias Sobrino 34'; Alejandra Fernández Maceiras 67'	Attendance: 234; Referee: Lorena Martínez Fernández (FER)

17 December 2023	Crealia El Salvador	7–19	Silicius Majadahonda	Estadio Pepe Rojo, Valladolid
11:00 CET (UTC+1)	Try: Tecla Masoko Bueriberi 57' c Con: Alba Alpín Bardaji 58'; Cards: Lieve Geraldine Stallmann (yellow card) 18' to 28'; Belsay Escudero López (yellow card) 37' to 47'		Try: Vico Gorrochategui Juste 38' c Con: Cristina López Calderón 39'; Pen: Cristina López Calderón (4) 9', 13', 23', 35'; Cards: Claudia Pérez Pérez (yellow card) 77' to end'	Attendance: 102; Referee: Jenny Lee (FER)

=== Round 5 ===
18 November 2023	(TBP) Silicius Majadahonda	60–7	Sant Cugat	Valle del Arcipreste, Majadahonda
16:00 CET (UTC+1)	Try: Macarena Teresa Del Valle Gelineau 7' c Denisse Gortázar Valverde (2) 12' m, 23' c Jimena Blanco-Hortiguera Pedrero (2) 15' m, 70' m Zahia Pérez Wilhelm 29' m Luisina Contreras 31' c Marta Pilar Cantabrana Gil 45' c Valentina Maldonado Jaimes 54' m Marta Ferrandiz Lefler 66' c Con: Jimena Blanco-Hortiguera Pedrero (4) 7', 23', 54', 70'; Zahia Pérez Wilhelm 45'		Try: Linda López Tagliafico 78' c Con: Inés Bueso-Inchausti García 78'	Referee: Andoni Susperregui Iragorri (FER)

13 January 2024	AVR FC Barcelona	23–5	Olímpico de Pozuelo	La Teixonera, Barcelona
16:00 CET (UTC+1)	Try: Ariadna Antonio Luis 25' m Martina Márquez Alpáñez 35' c Axelle Beatrice Alexia Ramon 70' m Con: Claudia Peña 36'; Pen: Claudia Peña (2) 11', 46'		Try: Lia Piñeiro Gómez 48' m Cards: Iris Moura Esteves Coluna (yellow card) 34' to 44'; Luz Martín Márquez (yellow card) 40' to 50'	Referee: Eki Fanlo Antzin (FER)

14 January 2024	Ghenova Cocos	17–64	Crealia El Salvador (TBP)	La Cartuja, Seville
11:00 CET (UTC+1)	Try: Irene Romero Lopez 55' m Tisera Samantha Volkman (2) 71' c, 76' m Con: Carolina Fernanda Alfaro 71'		Try: Ocean Tierney 13' m María Miguel Gil (3) 13' c, 25' c, 38' c Inés Antolínez Fernández 18' c Irene Alonso Pinilla 30' c Tecla Masoko Bueriberi 41' c Carla Villegas Mintegui (2) 61' c, 80' c Con: Alba Alpín Bardaji (8) 14', 19', 26', 34', 39', 42', 62', 80'; Pen: Alba Alpín Bardaji 2'; Cards: Tecla Masoko Bueriberi (yellow card) 70' to end' Carla Méndez Vázquez (yellow card) 71' to end'	Referee: Luis Fernández Díaz (FER)

14 January 2024	(TBP) CRAT Residencia Rialta	52–5	Eibar RT	Elviña, A Coruña
12:00 CET (UTC+1)	Try: Cecilia Huarte Sebastian (2) 6' c, 64' c Mariana Carolina Romero Pérez (2) 8' c, 44' c Miriam Roig González 15' c Elsa Porto Vieiros 39' c Alicia San Martín Alonso 75' c Con: Ana Iglesias Sobrino (5) 7', 9', 16', 40', 44'; Alejandra Fernández Maceiras (2) 65', 76'; Pen: Ana Iglesias Sobrino 2'		Try: Doha Benslaiman Kraichi 25' m	Attendance: 100; Referee: Roger Parera Villacampa (FER)

=== Round 6 ===
20 January 2024	CRAT Residencia Rialta	13–12	Crealia El Salvador (DBP)	Elviña, A Coruña
16:00 CET (UTC+1)	Try: Inês Spinola Duarte 10' m Iciar Pozo Eizaguirre 32' m Pen: Ana Iglesias Sobrino 23'; Cards: Alejandra Fernández Maceiras (yellow card) 72' to end'		Try: Lieve Geraldine Stallmann (2) 45' c, 72' m Con: Alba Alpín Bardaji 45'; Cards: Tecla Masoko Bueriberi (yellow card) 53' to 63'	Referee: Andoni Susperregui Iragorri (FER)

20 January 2024	Olímpico de Pozuelo	26–38	Silicius Majadahonda	Valle de las Cañas, Pozuelo de Alarcón
16:00 CET (UTC+1)	Try: Penalty Try 5'; Irene Schiavón Matteo 12' c Beatriz Baraia-Etxaburu Astigarraga 14' m Sidorella Bracic Rodríguez 54' c Con: Chiara Pisu Pisu (2) 13', 55'		Try: María Marín García 9' c Cristina López Calderón 29' m Alicia Guío Pertíñez 39' m Luisina Contreras 64' m Denisse Gortázar Valverde (2) 73' m, 80' m Con: Cristina López Calderón 10'; Pen: Cristina López Calderón (2) 18', 78'; Cards: Lucía Calvo Corredera (yellow card) 5' to 15'	Attendance: 100; Referee: Luis Fernández Díaz (FER)

21 January 2024	Eibar RT	0–39	AVR FC Barcelona (TBP)	Unbe, Eibar
12:00 CET (UTC+1)			Try: Claudia Peña 30' c Mercè Viñals Españó 55' c Gemma Silva Serra 68' c Gina Navarro Brea 76' c Martina Márquez Alpáñez 80' m Con: Claudia Peña (4) 30', 55', 68', 76'; Pen: Claudia Peña (2) 13', 35'	Attendance: 109; Referee: Lorena Martínez Fernández (FER)

21 January 2024	Sant Cugat	17–15	Ghenova Cocos (DBP)	ZEM La Guinardera, Sant Cugat del Vallès
12:30 CET (UTC+1)	Try: Elisabet Segarra Cararach 14' m Mireia García Santiago 23' c Inés Bueso-Inchausti García 42' m Con: Zoé Marie Elise Bastide 24'; Cards: Sara Marín i Puyuelo (yellow card) 31' to 41'; Irene Aires Parra (yellow card) 79' to end'		Try: Tonya Jayne Wessman 33' m Ruby-May Emily Ngaruhe 45' m Laura Muñiz Fernández 64' m Cards: Claudia Sánchez de la Herrán (yellow card) 9' to 19'	Attendance: 151; Referee: Jenny Lee (FER)

=== Round 7 ===
3 February 2024	(TBP) Silicius Majadahonda	39–5	Eibar RT	Valle del Arcipreste, Majadahonda
16:00 CET (UTC+1)	Try: Luisina Contreras 12' m Cristina López Calderón (2) 17' c, 50' m Vico Gorrochategui Juste 28' c Penalty Try 57'; Denisse Gortázar Valverde 64' m Con: Cristina López Calderón (2) 18', 29'; Pen: Zahia Pérez Wilhelm 2'		Try: Yamila Alejandra Otero Bures 43' m Cards: Letelemalanuola Fuatino Leafaitulagi Ii Lavea (yellow card) 56' to 66'	Referee: Luis Lasala de la Rosa (FER)

3 February 2024	Ghenova Cocos	19–5	Olímpico de Pozuelo	La Cartuja, Seville
16:30 CET (UTC+1)	Try: Claudia Sánchez de la Herrán 40' m Ilham Chouaib Hassany 76' m Pen: Carolina Fernanda Alfaro (3) 16', 46', 68'; Cards: María De Las Huertas Román Mallén (yellow card) 14' to 24'; María Estepa Navarro (yellow card) 24' to 34'		Try: Sidorella Bracic Rodríguez 78' m Cards: Iris Moura Esteves Coluna (yellow card) 58' to 68'	Referee: Joaquín Santoro Ferreiro (FER)

4 February 2024	Crealia El Salvador	35–17	Sant Cugat	Estadio Pepe Rojo, Valladolid
12:00 CET (UTC+1)	Try: Tecla Masoko Bueriberi 11' m Maria Del Carmen Martos Cuesta 40' c Elisa Castro Camarero 50' m Marina Bravo Bragado 58' c Isabel Sierra Martín 65' m Con: Alba Alpín Bardaji (2) 40', 59'; Pen: Alba Alpín Bardaji (2) 29', 74'; Cards: Inés Antolínez Fernández (yellow card) 33' to 43'		Try: Elisabet Segarra Cararach (2) 38' c, 80' m Mireia de Andrés Garrido 43' m Con: Inés Bueso-Inchausti García 39'	Referee: Alfonso Mirat Serván (FER)

4 February 2024	AVR FC Barcelona	13–26	CRAT Residencia Rialta (TBP)	La Teixonera, Barcelona
14:00 CET (UTC+1)	Try: Mercè Viñals Españó 18' c Con: Claudia Peña 18'; Pen: Claudia Peña (2) 7', 70'; Cards: Elena Comadran de Barnola (yellow card) 72' to end'		Try: Inês Spinola Duarte 11' c Alicia San Martín Alonso 49' c María Vega Álvarez 65' c Isabel Martí Montoro 74' m Con: Ana Iglesias Sobrino (3) 12', 49', 65'	Attendance: 259; Referee: Lorena Martínez Fernández (FER)

=== Round 8 ===
17 February 2024	(DBP) AVR FC Barcelona	14–20	Ghenova Cocos	La Teixonera, Barcelona
11:30 CET (UTC+1)	Try: Silvia Julia i Rossell 20' c Martina Márquez Alpáñez 76' c Con: Claudia Peña (2) 21', 77'		Try: Ilham Chouaib Hassany 29' m Ruby-May Emily Ngaruhe (2) 44' c, 52' m Con: Carolina Fernanda Alfaro 45'; Pen: Carolina Fernanda Alfaro 18'; Cards: Carolina Fernanda Alfaro (yellow card) 73' to end'	Referee: Alfonso Mirat Serván (FER)

17 February 2024	Sant Cugat	24–24	CRAT Residencia Rialta	ZEM La Guinardera, Sant Cugat del Vallès
14:30 CET (UTC+1)	Try: Mireia García Santiago 3' c Marina García Mota 36' c Laia Azorín Canosa 74' c Con: Zoé Marie Elise Bastide (3) 4', 37', 75'; Pen: Zoé Marie Elise Bastide 44'		Try: Alba Lisandra Martínez Medina 6' m Mariana Carolina Romero Pérez (2) 31' m, 80'; Isabel Martí Montoro 50' c Con: Ana Iglesias Sobrino (2) 50', 80'	Referee: Luis Fernández Díaz (FER)

18 February 2024	(DBP) Eibar RT	5–7	Olímpico de Pozuelo	Unbe, Eibar
11:00 CET (UTC+1)	Try: Aleuzenev Alejandra Cid Pérez 8' m		Try: Lia Piñeiro Gómez 11' c Con: Chiara Pisu Pisu 13'; Cards: Maria del Castillo Orozco (yellow card) 65' to 75'	Referee: David Joaquín Castro Muñiz (FER)

18 February 2024	Silicius Majadahonda	17–14	Crealia El Salvador (DBP)	Valle del Arcipreste, Majadahonda
12:00 CET (UTC+1)	Try: Maria Kimberly Marcos Nve (2) 26' m, 51' m Cayetana Álvarez Serrano 59' c Con: Yelyzaveta Havrylova 60'		Try: Elisa Castro Camarero 3' c Marina Bravo Bragado 18' c Con: Alba Alpín Bardaji (2) 4', 19'	Referee: Luis Lasala de la Rosa (FER)

=== Round 9 ===
2 March 2024	Crealia El Salvador	20–5	CRAT Residencia Rialta	Estadio Pepe Rojo, Valladolid
16:00 CET (UTC+1)	Try: Tecla Masoko Bueriberi 21' m Inés Antolínez Fernández 75' c Amaia Fabo Pérez 78' m Con: Alba Alpín Bardaji 76'; Pen: Alba Alpín Bardaji 63'		Try: Isabel Martí Montoro 46' m Cards: Judit Hernández Modino (yellow card) 63' to 73'; Ana Iglesias Sobrino (yellow card) 73' to end'	Attendance: 500; Referee: Luis Lasala de la Rosa (FER)

2 March 2024	Sant Cugat	13–36	Silicius Majadahonda (TBP)	ZEM La Guinardera, Sant Cugat del Vallès
16:00 CET (UTC+1)	Try: Marina García Mota 75' c Con: Zoé Marie Elise Bastide 76'; Pen: Zoé Marie Elise Bastide (2) 24', 30'; Cards: Maitane Ibáñez Sole (yellow card) 37' to 47'		Try: Isabelle María Grisé 8' c Marta Fresno Jimenez 13' m Penalty Try 37'; María Marín García 42' c Cayetana Álvarez Serrano 48' c Con: Zahia Pérez Wilhelm (3) 9', 43', 49'; Pen: Zahia Pérez Wilhelm 22'; Cards: Marta Fresno Jimenez (yellow card) 31' to 41'; Marta Estellés Chaparro (yellow card) 72' to end'	Referee: Joaquín Santoro Ferreiro (FER)

3 March 2024	(DBP) Olímpico de Pozuelo	15–22	Ghenova Cocos	Valle de las Cañas, Pozuelo de Alarcón
13:00 CET (UTC+1)	Try: Chiara Pisu Pisu 40' m Steffi Frances Hooson 53' c Con: Chiara Pisu Pisu 54'; Pen: Chiara Pisu Pisu 46'		Try: Claudia Sánchez de la Herrán 5' m Tisera Samantha Volkman 30' c Ruby-May Emily Ngaruhe 36' c Con: Carolina Fernanda Alfaro (2) 31', 37'; Pen: Carolina Fernanda Alfaro 63'; Cards: Ruby-May Emily Ngaruhe (yellow card) 46' to 56'	Referee: Andoni Susperregui Iragorri (FER)

3 March 2024	(DBP) AVR FC Barcelona	17–18	Eibar RT	La Teixonera, Barcelona
13:30 CET (UTC+1)	Try: Ariadna Antonio Luis 4' m Claudia Peña 42' c Silvia Julia i Rossell 55' m Con: Paula León Pérez 43'; Cards: Mireia Martínez Jañez (yellow card) 63' to 73'; Gemma Silva Serra (yellow card) 74' to end'		Try: Aiora Ibar Aguado 39' c Oihane López De Ullibarri Torrado 52' m Con: Naroa López Torrado 40'; Pen: Naroa López Torrado (2) 32', 75'; Cards: Letelemalanuola Fuatino Leafaitulagi Ii Lavea (yellow card) 18' to 28'	Referee: Luis Fernández Díaz (FER)

=== Round 10 ===
16 March 2024	Olímpico de Pozuelo	7–28	AVR FC Barcelona	Valle de las Cañas, Pozuelo de Alarcón
16:30 CET (UTC+1)	Try: Steffi Frances Hooson 37' c Con: Chiara Pisu Pisu 38'; Cards: Molly Harmina Stetsko (yellow card) 79' to end'		Try: Claudia Peña (3) 51' c, 60' c, 80' m Con: Claudia Peña (2) 52', 61'; Pen: Claudia Peña (3) 40', 42', 65'	Attendance: 32; Referee: Luis Lasala de la Rosa (FER)

17 March 2024	Ghenova Cocos	15–15	Eibar RT	Polideportivo San Pablo, Seville
11:00 CET (UTC+1)	Try: Duna Gómez Sivianes 53' m Blanca Ruiz Cabrero 59' c Con: Carolina Fernanda Alfaro 59'; Drop: Carolina Fernanda Alfaro 14'		Try: Doha Benslaiman Kraichi 19' c Nerea García Rementería 35' m Con: Lorea Mar Barrutia 20'; Pen: Lorea Mar Barrutia 15'	Referee: Iñaki Muñoz Martín (FER)

17 March 2024	Sant Cugat	22–36	Crealia El Salvador (TBP)	ZEM La Guinardera, Sant Cugat del Vallès
12:00 CET (UTC+1)	Try: Mireia García Santiago 32' m Marina García Mota 51' c Laia Azorín Canosa 79' c Con: Zoé Marie Elise Bastide (2) 53', 80'; Pen: Zoé Marie Elise Bastide 17'		Try: Inés Antolínez Fernández 1' c María Miguel Gil 8' m Tecla Masoko Bueriberi 36' m Amaia Fabo Pérez 47' m Belsay Escudero López 56' c Beatriz Rivera Zapatero 73' c Con: Alba Alpín Bardaji (3) 2', 57', 74'; Cards: Carla Méndez Vázquez (yellow card) 79' to end' Elisa Castro Camarero (red card) 69'	Referee: Jenny Lee (FER)

17 March 2024	CRAT Residencia Rialta	19–7	Silicius Majadahonda	Elviña, A Coruña
12:00 CET (UTC+1)	Try: Judit Hernández Modino 10' c Alba Lisandra Martínez Medina 22' c Inês Spinola Duarte 35' m Con: Ana Iglesias Sobrino (2) 11', 23'		Try: Claudia Pérez Pérez 28' c Con: Zahia Pérez Wilhelm 29'	Referee: David Joaquín Castro Muñiz (FER)

== Relegation playoff ==
25 May 2024	Eibar RT	20–23	Complutense Cisneros	Estadio Pepe Rojo, Valladolid
17:30 CEST (UTC+2)	Try: Jone Carral Zarandona 8' m Lorea Mar Barrutia 15' m Aleuzenev Alejandra Cid Pérez 29' m Jessica Nugent 76' m		Try: Elisa Álvarez Yuste 13' c Sonia Montero González 32' m Inas El Ammouri Ruiz 54' m Con: Elisa Álvarez Yuste 14'; Pen: Elisa Álvarez Yuste (2) 48', 59'; Cards: Inas El Ammouri Ruiz (yellow card) 25' to 35'; Sofía Ayuso Fernández (yellow card) 75' to end'	Attendance: 431; Referee: Carlos Guerrero Padín (FER)

== Play-offs ==
Quarter-finals
4	Sant Cugat	26
5	Ghenova Cocos	17
3	Crealia El Salvador	23
6	AVR FC Barcelona	25

Semi-finals
1	Silicius Majadahonda	27
4	Sant Cugat	17
2	CRAT Residencia Rialta	24
6	AVR FC Barcelona	15

Final
1	Silicius Majadahonda	13
2	CRAT Residencia Rialta	12

=== Quarter-finals ===
5 May 2024	Sant Cugat	26–17 (a.e.t.)	Ghenova Cocos	ZEM La Guinardera, Sant Cugat del Vallès
13:00 CEST (UTC+2)	Try: Marina García Mota 8' c Uxue Merino Duñabeitia 25' c Maitane Ibáñez Sole 88' c Zoé Marie Elise Bastide 91' m Con: Zoé Marie Elise Bastide (3) 9', 26', 89'; Cards: Natalia Gómez Alberich (yellow card) 90' to 100'		Try: Claudia Sánchez de la Herrán 53' m Pen: Carolina Fernanda Alfaro (4) 1', 39', 64', 90'; Cards: Ruby-May Emily Ngaruhe (yellow card) 63' to 73'	Referee: Alfonso Mirat Serván (FER)

5 May 2024	Crealia El Salvador	23–25	AVR FC Barcelona	Estadio Pepe Rojo, Valladolid
12:00 CEST (UTC+2)	Try: Tecla Masoko Bueriberi 7' m Carmen Miranda Miralles 17' m Beatriz Rivera Zapatero 79' c Con: Alba Alpín Bardaji 80'; Pen: Alba Alpín Bardaji (2) 34', 67'; Cards: Marina Bravo Bragado (yellow card) 25' to 35'		Try: Martina Márquez Alpáñez 12' c Laura León Peters 51' m Claudia Peña 62' c Con: Claudia Peña (2) 13', 63'; Pen: Claudia Peña (2) 23', 76'; Cards: Mireia Martínez Jañez (yellow card) 14' to 24'	Referee: Luis Fernández Díaz (FER)

=== Semi-finals ===
11 May 2024	Silicius Majadahonda	27–17	Sant Cugat	Valle del Arcipreste, Majadahonda
16:00 CEST (UTC+2)	Try: Isabelle María Grisé 7' m Macarena Teresa Del Valle Gelineau (2) 12' m, 72' c María Marín García 58' m Cayetana Álvarez Serrano 61' m Con: Zahia Pérez Wilhelm 73'; Cards: Lucía Calvo Corredera (yellow card) 80' to end'		Try: Carla Isabel Arca García 16' c Inés Bueso-Inchausti García 36' c Con: Zoé Marie Elise Bastide (2) 17', 37'; Pen: Zoé Marie Elise Bastide 33'	Attendance: 148; Referee: Lorena Martínez Fernández (FER)

12 May 2024	CRAT Residencia Rialta	24–15	AVR FC Barcelona	Elviña, A Coruña
13:00 CEST (UTC+2)	Try: Elsa Porto Vieiros (2) 25' c, 66' m Alicia San Martín Alonso 44' c Alba Lisandra Martínez Medina 46' m Con: Ana Iglesias Sobrino (2) 26', 45'		Try: Claudia Peña (2) 13' m, 53' c Con: Claudia Peña 54'; Pen: Claudia Peña 3'; Cards: Mercè Viñals i Españo (yellow card) 65' to 75'	Referee: Iñaki Muñoz Martín (FER)

=== Final ===
19 May 2024	Silicius Majadahonda	13–12	CRAT Residencia Rialta	Valle del Arcipreste, Majadahonda
12:00 CEST (UTC+2)	Try: María Marín García 20' c Con: Cristina López Calderón 21'; Pen: Cristina López Calderón (2) 14', 79'; Cards: Paula Hernández de Lucas (yellow card) 37' to 47'		Try: Penalty Try 38'; Iciar Pozo Eizaguirre 76' m	Attendance: 538; Referee: Jenny Lee (FER)

== Leading scorers ==
=== Most points ===
Rank	Player	Club	Points
1	(Spain) Claudia Peña	AVR FC Barcelona	151
2	(Spain) Cristina López Calderón	Silicius Majadahonda	78
3	(France) Zoé Marie Elise Bastide	Sant Cugat	73
4	(Spain) Alba Alpín Bardaji	Crealia El Salvador	69
5	(Chile) Carolina Fernanda Alfaro	Ghenova Cocos	56
6	(Spain) Ana Iglesias Sobrino	CRAT Residencia Rialta	52
7	(Spain) Tecla Masoko Bueriberi	Crealia El Salvador	50
8	(Venezuela) Mariana Carolina Romero Pérez	CRAT Residencia Rialta	40
9	(Spain) Chiara Pisu Pisu	Olímpico de Pozuelo	36
10	(Spain) Alba Lisandra Martínez Medina	CRAT Residencia Rialta	35
10	(Spain) María Miguel Gil	Crealia El Salvador	35

=== Most tries ===
Rank	Player	Club	Tries
1	(Spain) Claudia Peña	AVR FC Barcelona	13
2	(Spain) Tecla Masoko Bueriberi	Crealia El Salvador	10
3	(Venezuela) Mariana Carolina Romero Pérez	CRAT Residencia Rialta	8
4	(Spain) Alba Lisandra Martínez Medina	Crealia El Salvador	7
4	(Spain) María Miguel Gil	Crealia El Salvador	7
6	(Spain) Denisse Gortázar Valverde	Silicius Majadahonda	6
6	(Spain) Elisabet Segarra Cararach	Sant Cugat	6
6	(Portugal) Inês Spinola Duarte	CRAT Residencia Rialta	6
6	(Spain) Marina García Mota	Sant Cugat	6
10	(Spain) Cristina López Calderón	Silicius Majadahonda	5
10	(Spain) Isabel Martí Montoro	CRAT Residencia Rialta	5
10	(Australia) Tisera Samantha Volkman	Ghenova Cocos	5

== Super Cup ==
II Supercopa Iberdrola de Rugby
- Countries: Spain
- Number of teams: 2
- Date: 9 December 2023
- Champions: Silicius Majadahonda (2nd title)
- Runners-up: Ghenova Cocos
- Matches played: 1
- Tries scored: 4 (average 4 per match)

On November 28, the Spanish Rugby Federation announced an agreement between the two involved teams for which the second edition of the Supercup would be played at the same time as the League matches between them. Thus, Round 3 match played on December 9 in Majadahonda would be also the first leg of the Supercup. If both team ended on the same group for the second phase of the League, the match between them played on Seville would be the second leg, while if the teams ended in different groups, the winner of the first one would be crowned champion.

After Round 6 of the League regular season, since it was already impossible for Ghenova Cocos to end in the top 4 of the table, Silicius Majadahonda was declared champion of the Super Cup.

9 December 2023	Silicius Majadahonda	31–3	Ghenova Cocos	Valle del Arcipreste, Majadahonda
16:00 CET (UTC+1)	Try: Cristina López Calderón (2) 33' c, 75' c Lucía Díaz Martín 52' c Pilar Soria Struch 78' c Con: Cristina López Calderón (4) 33', 52', 75', 78'; Pen: Cristina López Calderón 4'		Pen: Carolina Fernanda Alfaro 36'; Cards: María Estepa Navarro (yellow card) 57' to 67'	Attendance: 200; Referee: Andoni Susperregui Iragorri (FER)

== RFER Cup ==
2023–24 Copa RFER
- Countries: Spain
- Number of teams: 16
- Date: 24 September 2023 – 20 April 2024
- Champions: Silicius Majadahonda (1st title)
- Runners-up: CRAT Residencia Rialta
- Matches played: 27
- Tries scored: 205 (average 7.6 per match)

Official website
- resultadosrugby.isquad.es/clasificacion.php?id_competicion=42

After the 2023 General Assembly, the Spanish Rugby Federation announced the creation of a new competition, the RFER Cup, set to be played in preseason and during the 2024 Rugby Europe Women's Championship window. The competition will see the 16 teams of the two top categories split in 4 regional pools. Every team will play once against the other 3 in their pool, and the winner of each one will classify for the semi-finals.

=== Pool A ===
Pos	Team	P	W	D	L	PF	PA	PD	TF	TA	TD	TBP	DBP	Pts
1	CRAT Residencia Rialta	3	3	0	0	97	26	71	17	4	13	3	0	15
2	Eibar RT	3	2	0	1	58	54	4	9	8	1	1	0	9
3	Getxo RT	3	1	0	2	66	84	-18	9	14	-5	0	0	4
4	PRB Flor de Escocia UBU	3	0	0	3	36	93	-57	6	15	-9	0	0	0
First qualify for semi-finals.

==== Round 1 ====
23 September 2023	Eibar RT	27–19	PRB Flor de Escocia UBU	Altamira estadioa, Ordizia
17:30 CEST (UTC+2)	Try: Ane Rincón Madinabeitia 5' m Aleuzenev Alejandra Cid Pérez 14' m Águeda Pis Arnaiz 29' c Nerea García Rementería 62' c Con: Adara Alfonso Boubeta (2) 29', 63'; Pen: Adara Alfonso Boubeta 80'		Try: Nuria Manzanedo Castañeda 44' c Beatriz Julia Almarán Alarcón 67' m Laura Maestro García 79' c Con: Hannah Thyra Smid (2) 44', 79'; Cards: Paula Casado Santamaria (yellow card) 48' to 58'	Attendance: 300; Referee: Francisco Jesús Gázquez Bendicho (FER)

24 September 2023	(TBP) CRAT Residencia Rialta	43–19	Getxo RT	Elviña, A Coruña
12:00 CEST (UTC+2)	Try: Claudia Barrio De Pablo 15' m Cecilia Huarte Sebastian 17' c Iciar Pozo Eizaguirre 28' c Mariana Carolina Romero Pérez 38' c Leyre Maria Bianchi Mira (2) 41' m, 61' m Miriam Roig González 42' c Con: Ana Iglesias Sobrino (4) 21', 29', 39', 42'		Try: Garazi Goikolea Lopez De Munain (2) 23' m, 78' c Naia Goiriena 73' c Con: Naroa Azpitarte Maguregui (2) 74', 79; Cards: Jone Etxegia Mardaras (yellow card) 31' to 41'; Garazi Goikolea Lopez De Munain (yellow card) 51' to 61'	Attendance: 200; Referee: Alberto Díaz Camarero (FER)

==== Round 2 ====
8 October 2023	(TBP) Eibar RT	31–20	Getxo RT	Unbe, Eibar
11:30 CEST (UTC+2)	Try: Águeda Pis Arnaiz (2) 7' m, 45' c Aleuzenev Alejandra Cid Pérez (2) 21' c, 79' m Natale Murray Barandika 67' c Con: Adara Alfonso Boubeta (3) 21', 45', 67'		Try: Garazi Goikolea Lopez De Munain 37' c Naroa Azpitarte Maguregui 60' c Con: Naroa Azpitarte Maguregui (2) 37', 60'; Pen: Naroa Azpitarte Maguregui (2) 11', 34'	Attendance: 200; Referee: Jokin Osete Ardanaz (FER)

8 October 2023	PRB Flor de Escocia UBU	7–39	CRAT Residencia Rialta (TBP)	Campo de Rugby Bienvenido Nieto, Burgos
12:00 CEST (UTC+2)	Try: Beatriz Rodríguez Revilla 28' c Con: Laura Maestro García 29'		Try: Mariana Carolina Romero Pérez (2) 5' c, 12' m María Da Conceição Peixoto Rodrigues 28' m Isabel Martí Montoro 33' m Alba Rubial Lalín 50' m Judit Hernández Modino 60' c Alejandra Fernández Maceiras 66' m Con: Ana Iglesias Sobrino (2) 6', 60'	Attendance: 150; Referee: Álvaro González García (FER)

==== Round 3 ====
22 October 2023	Getxo RT	27–10	PRB Flor de Escocia UBU	Polideportivo Fadura, Getxo
11:30 CEST (UTC+2)	Try: Barbara Pla Vegue 29' m Jone Etxegia Mardaras (2) 36' c, 54' m Itsaso Reina Romeo 60' c Con: Naroa Azpitarte Maguregui (2) 37', 61'; Pen: Naroa Azpitarte Maguregui 4'		Try: Angela Martin Larkova 13' m Marina Fernandez Mendez 64' m Cards: Beatriz Rodriguez Revilla (yellow card) 70' to end'	Attendance: 200; Referee: Pedro José Pérez (FER)

22 October 2023	(TBP) CRAT Residencia Rialta	15–0	Eibar RT	Elviña, A Coruña
12:00 CEST (UTC+2)	Try: Alejandra Fernández Maceiras (2) 60' m, 75' m Alba Lisandra Martínez Medina 72' m Cards: Lucía García Díaz (yellow card) 79' to end'		Cards: Águeda Pis Arnaiz (yellow card) 39' to 49'; Alejandra Cid Pérez Aleuzenev (yellow card) 47' to 57'; Natale Murray Barandika (yellow card) 67' to 77'	Attendance: 100; Referee: Eduardo Frances Torres (FER)

=== Pool B ===
Pos	Team	P	W	D	L	PF	PA	PD	TF	TA	TD	TBP	DBP	Pts
1	Sant Cugat	3	3	0	0	108	30	78	18	5	13	2	0	14
2	AVR FC Barcelona	3	2	0	1	56	53	3	9	9	0	1	0	9
3	Les Abelles	3	1	0	2	44	56	-12	8	9	-1	0	0	4
4	Turia RC	3	0	0	3	36	105	-69	6	18	-12	0	0	0
First qualify for semi-finals.

==== Round 1 ====
23 September 2023	Turia RC	12–22	Les Abelles	Poliesportiu Quatre Carreres, Valencia
15:30 CEST (UTC+2)	Try: Carlota Pardo Peinador 24' m Juana Stella 43' c Con: Laura García Castañeda 44'; Cards: Noelia Judith Zapata Saldivia (yellow card) 69' to 79'; Aura Csongradi García (yellow card) 75' to end'		Try: Kiara Mariel Espósito Lencinas 3' c Fanny Gomez Martín 15' m Irene Noguera Serra 62' m Valentina Perez Marque 76' m Con: Ester López Roig 4'; Cards: Kiara Mariel Espósito Lencinas (yellow card) 42' to 52'; Alma Chornet Gimeno (yellow card) 79' to end'	Attendance: 200; Referee: Lluís Llauger Suau (FER)

23 September 2023	(TBP) Sant Cugat	34–3	AVR FC Barcelona	Nou Santa Bàrbara, Sitges
19:45 CEST (UTC+2)	Try: Laia Azorín Canosa 31' m Carla Rodríguez Martínez 42' c Ana Harris Martínez 45' m Alysha Cera Stone 62' c Linda López Tagliafico 72' m Carla Isabel Arca García 79' m Con: Lucía Moya Barruetabeña (2) 42', 62'; Cards: Alysha Cera Stone (yellow card) 20' to 30'		Pen: Paula León Pérez 38'; Cards: Ariadna Antonio Luis (yellow card) 25' to 35'; Amanda Lucía Villa Morales (yellow card) 66' to 76'	Referee: Federico Javier Japas (FER)

==== Round 2 ====
7 October 2023	Turia RC	10–47	Sant Cugat (TBP)	Poliesportiu Quatre Carreres, Valencia
15:30 CEST (UTC+2)	Try: Marina Marin Peiro 12' m Ninive Hernandez Rios 44' m		Try: Mireia García Santiago 14' c Esther Moraleda Pedrero 30' m Alexia Gasco Amoros 32' m Martina Benito De Manuel 40' m Carla Isabel Arca García 50' m Laia Azorín Canosa 65' c Martina Benito De Manuel (2) 70' m, 78' m Con: Lucía Moya Barruetabeña 14'; Zoé Marie Elise Bastide 65'; Pen: Lucía Moya Barruetabeña 60'; Cards: Alexia Gasco Amoros (yellow card) 44' to 54'	Attendance: 300; Referee: Vanesa Garrancho Campero (FER)

7 October 2023	Les Abelles	5–17	AVR FC Barcelona	Poliesportiu Quatre Carreres, Valencia
17:00 CEST (UTC+2)	Try: Claudia Moñino Montagut 69' m Cards: Carla Ramón Perete (yellow card) 64' to 74'		Try: Ana Marina Sánchez De La Riva 4' c Paula León Pérez 7' m Paula Garzón Osorio 20' m Con: Axelle Beatrice Alexia Ramon 5'; Cards: Amanda Lucía Villa Morales (yellow card) 17' to 27'; Paula León Pérez (yellow card) 78' to end'	Attendance: 150; Referee: Vanesa Garrancho Campero (FER)

==== Round 3 ====
21 October 2023	Sant Cugat	27–17	Les Abelles	ZEM La Guinardera, Sant Cugat del Vallès
15:00 CEST (UTC+2)	Try: Martina Benito de Manuel 31' c Elisabet Segarra Cararach (2) 49' c, 76' m Marina García Mota 67' m Con: Marie Elise Bastide Zoe (2) 32', 50'; Pen: Marie Elise Bastide Zoe 2'; Cards: Marina García Mota (yellow card) 40' to 50'; Linda López Tagliafico (yellow card) 57' to 67'		Try: Laura Espada Zamora 14' c Tania Cifuentes García 36' m Fanny Gómez Martín 73' m Con: Alejandra Marina Romay 15'	Attendance: 300; Referee: Belarmino Álvarez (FER)

21 October 2023	(TBP) AVR FC Barcelona	36–14	Turia RC	La Teixonera, Barcelona
16:00 CEST (UTC+2)	Try: Paula Garzón Osorio 1' m Mercè Viñals Españó 16' m Axelle Beatrice Alexia Ramon 24' m Gael Albesa Vinuesa 28' c Ariadna Antonio Luis 46' c Amanda Lucía Villa Morales 58' m Con: Paula León Pérez 25'; Axelle Beatrice Alexia Ramon (2) 47', 59'; Cards: Mercè Viñals Españó (red card) 28'		Try: Juana Stella 7' c Julia Garcia Villar 70' c Con: Candela Cembrano Alegria (2) 7', 70'	Attendance: 246; Referee: Elena Mora Serrano (FER)

=== Pool C ===
Pos	Team	P	W	D	L	PF	PA	PD	TF	TA	TD	TBP	DBP	Pts
1	Silicius Majadahonda	3	3	0	0	146	19	127	25	3	22	2	0	14
2	Crealia El Salvador	3	2	0	1	102	41	61	16	6	10	2	0	10
3	Olímpico de Pozuelo	3	1	0	2	33	114	-81	5	20	-15	0	0	4
4	BUC Barcelona	3	0	0	3	22	129	-107	4	21	-17	0	1	1
First qualify for semi-finals.

==== Round 1 ====
23 September 2023	Olímpico de Pozuelo	21–15	BUC Barcelona (DBP)	Valle de las Cañas, Pozuelo de Alarcón
16:00 CEST (UTC+2)	Try: María Del Castillo 30' c Lia Piñeiro Gómez (2) 47' c, 49' c Con: Alba Mancebo Caberta (3) 30', 47', 49'; Cards: Susana Gutiérrez Mordini (yellow card) 64' to 74'		Try: Lucía Hernández Zuluaga 23' m Guadalupe Sánchez 45' m Aina Trabado Colas 60' m Cards: Silvia Sicart Solano (yellow card) 44' to 54'; Sara Díaz Costas (yellow card) 75' to end'	Attendance: 150; Referee: Jaime Silva Rios (FER)

23 September 2023	Crealia El Salvador	12–29	Silicius Majadahonda	Estadio Pepe Rojo, Valladolid
17:00 CEST (UTC+2)	Try: Tecla Masoko Bueriberi (2) 17' m, 33' c Con: Alba Alpín Bardaji 34'; Cards: Beatriz Rivera Zapatero (yellow card) 60' to 70'		Try: Lucía Díaz Martín 13' c Denisse Gortázar Valverde 48' c Claudia Pérez Pérez 62' c Cristina López Calderón 68' m Con: Jimena Blanco-Hortiguera Pedrero (3) 14', 49', 63'; Pen: Jimena Blanco-Hortiguera Pedrero 3'; Cards: Vico Gorrochategui Juste (yellow card) 7' to 17'	Attendance: 250; Referee: Miguel Antonio González de Luis (FER)

==== Round 2 ====
8 October 2023	BUC Barcelona	7–40	Crealia El Salvador (TBP)	La Foixarda, Barcelona
11:00 CEST (UTC+2)	Try: Guadalupe Sánchez 32' c Con: Aina Trabado Colas 33'		Try: Amaia Fabo Pérez (2) 11' c, 79' c Carmen Miranda Miralles 16' c Carla Villegas Mintegui 25' c Saray Avilés Alcoba 37' m Elisa Castro Camarero 77' c Con: Alba Alpín Bardaji (5) 12', 17', 26', 78', 79'; Cards: Maria Del Carmen Martos Cuesta (yellow card) 49' to 59'	Attendance: 100; Referee: Daniel Sarrión García (FER)

8 October 2023	(TBP) Silicius Majadahonda	49–7	Olímpico de Pozuelo	Valle del Arcipreste, Majadahonda
11:00 CEST (UTC+2)	Try: Marta Pilar Cantabrana Gil (2) 4' c, 70' m Cristina Cueto García 10' m Denisse Gortázar Valverde (3) 22' c, 47' m, 66' m Maria Kimberly Marcos Nve 30' m Carmen Rodera Leguey 37' m Olympia Marie Rose Camezind 67' m Con: Yelyzaveta Havrylova 5'; Patricia Alexandre González 23'; Cards: Alicia Guío Pertíñez (yellow card) 60' to 70'; Marta Fresno Jimenez (yellow card) 65' to 75'		Try: Beatriz Baraia-Etxaburu Astigarraga 63' c Con: Alba Mancebo Caberta 64'	Attendance: 200; Referee: Ramón Racionero Tortosa (FER)

==== Round 3 ====
21 October 2023	BUC Barcelona	0–68	Silicius Majadahonda (TBP)	La Foixarda, Barcelona
16:00 CEST (UTC+2)			Try: Marta Pilar Cantabrana Gil (4) 12' c, 28' m, 43' m, 75' m Cristina Cueto García 20' m Alicia Guío Pertíñez (2) 40' m, 49' m Alba Noa Castellano Cabello (2) 53' c, 61' c Cristina López Calderón (2) 63' m, 79' c Idaira Morales Cabrera 70' m Con: Cristina López Calderón (4) 15', 54', 62', 80'	Attendance: 100; Referee: Federico Javier Japas (FER)

22 October 2023	(TBP) Crealia El Salvador	50–5	Olímpico de Pozuelo	Estadio Pepe Rojo, Valladolid
11:00 CEST (UTC+2)	Try: Carla Méndez Vázquez 4' c Lieve Geraldine Stallmann 11' m Isabel Sierra Martín 27' c María Miguel Gil (2) 33' c, 35' c Amaia Fabo Pérez 60' c Elisa Castro Camarero (2) 75' m, 80' m Con: Carla Villegas Mintegui (5) 5', 28', 34', 36', 61'; Cards: Patricia Carreño Vallejo (yellow card) 58' to 68'		Try: Blanca Silvia Martín Bocos 71' m Cards: Raquel Bermejo Manteca (yellow card) 48' to 58'; Elena Milagros Jiménez Salguero (yellow card) 74' to end'	Referee: Jon Bravo Chivite (FER)

=== Pool D ===
Pos	Team	P	W	D	L	PF	PA	PD	TF	TA	TD	TBP	DBP	Pts
1	Ghenova Cocos	3	2	1	0	166	38	128	25	5	20	2	0	12
2	Complutense Cisneros	3	2	1	0	91	36	55	14	5	9	2	0	12
9	XV Hortaleza RC	3	1	0	2	32	141	-109	6	22	-16	1	0	5
4	Atlético Portuense	3	0	0	3	47	121	-74	7	20	-13	0	0	0
First qualify for semi-finals.

==== Round 1 ====
23 September 2023	(TBP) Complutense Cisneros	42–5	XV Hortaleza RC	Campo Central CIU, Madrid
16:00 CEST (UTC+2)	Try: Aiora Hijarrubia Lanau 34' m Claudia Cano Resino 45' c Margarita Blanco Esquivel 49' m Cristina Rubio Rodríguez 52' m Pilar Rico Del Valle (2) 68' m, 80' m Katya Piñero 73' c Con: Aiora Hijarrubia Lanau (2) 46', 74'; Pen: Elisa Álvarez Yuste 3'; Cards: Lucía Malagón Sánchez (yellow card) 11' to 21'		Try: Paula Canales Silvan 58' m	Attendance: 100; Referee: Silvia Garrido Ribas (FER)

24 September 2023	(TBP) Ghenova Cocos	62–21	Atlético Portuense	La Cartuja, Seville
11:00 CEST (UTC+2)	Try: Nicole Francesca Cerulli (2) 2' m, 31' c María De Las Huertas Román Mallén (3) 8' c, 28' m, 40' c Julia Castro Camino 11' m Ana Peralta Baquet (2) 37' c, 76' c Blanca Ruiz Cabrero (2) 46' m, 68' c Con: Carolina Fernanda Alfaro (6) 8', 31', 37', 40', 68', 76'		Try: María Martínez Carretero 16' c Paula Ruiz Madrid 23' c Idaira García López 64' c Con: Idaira García López (3) 16', 23', 64'; Cards: Valle Pérez Rodríguez (yellow card) 27' to 37'	Attendance: 200; Referee: Daniel Sarrión García (FER)

==== Round 2 ====
8 October 2023	Atlético Portuense	14–32	Complutense Cisneros (TBP)	Ciudad Deportiva Municipal Rafael Sánchez, El Puerto de Santa María
13:00 CEST (UTC+2)	Try: Idaira García López 5' c Diana Fortet Cortes 32' c Con: Idaira García López (2) 6', 32'; Cards: Carmen María Solbes Caballero (yellow card) 67' to 77'		Try: Aiora Hijarrubia Lanau (3) 12' c, 23' c, 69' m Pilar Rico Del Valle 44' m Sofía Ayuso Fernández 80' m Con: Elisa Álvarez Yuste (2) 12', 23'; Pen: Elisa Álvarez Yuste 51'; Cards: Cristina Rubio Rodríguez (yellow card) 16' to 26'	Attendance: 100; Referee: Alberto Díaz Camarero (FER)

14 October 2023	(TBP) Ghenova Cocos	87–0	XV Hortaleza RC	La Cartuja, Seville
16:00 CEST (UTC+2)	Try: 13; Con: 11			Attendance: 93; Referee: Miguel Antonio González de Luis (FER)

==== Round 3 ====
22 October 2023	(TBP) XV Hortaleza RC	27–12	Atlético Portuense	Parque Juan Pablo II, Madrid
12:00 CEST (UTC+2)	Try: Iratxe Aramburu Barreiro (3) 31' c, 47' m, 52' m Gracia Del Castillo Montull 39' m Andrea Camps Verd 80' m Con: Ines Palomo Rumschisky 32'; Cards: Andrea Camps Verd (yellow card) 62' to 72'		Try: Lara Borondo Rodríguez 55' c Ana García Agrela 70' m Con: Idaira García Lopez 55'; Cards: María Castellano Bernal (yellow card) 7' to 17'	Attendance: 80; Referee: Isaac Pujol Pasanau (FER)

22 October 2023	Complutense Cisneros	17–17	Ghenova Cocos	Campo Central CIU, Madrid
13:00 CEST (UTC+2)	Try: Monica González Prado 12' c Pilar Rico del Valle 34' c Con: Elisa Álvarez Yuste (2) 12', 34'; Pen: Elisa Álvarez Yuste 80'; Cards: Aiora Hijarrubia Lanau (yellow card) 36' to 46'; Claudia Cano Resino (yellow card) 37' to 47'		Try: Ruby-May Emily Ngaruhe 50' c Marta Carmona Pérez 61' c Con: Carolina Fernanda Alfaro (2) 51', 62'; Pen: Carolina Fernanda Alfaro 26'	Attendance: 200; Referee: Lluís Llauger Suau (FER)

=== Play-offs ===
Semi-finals
1	CRAT Residencia Rialta	72
4	Ghenova Cocos	0
3	Silicius Majadahonda	32
2	Sant Cugat	13

Final
CRAT Residencia Rialta	10
Silicius Majadahonda	16

==== Semi-finals ====
14 April 2024	CRAT Residencia Rialta	72–0	Ghenova Cocos	Elviña, A Coruña
13:30 CEST (UTC+2)	Try: Isabel Martí Montoro 4' c Iciar Pozo Eizaguirre 7' c Inês Spinola Duarte (2) 23' m, 36' c Cecilia Huarte Sebastian (2) 31' c, 55' c Alicia San Martín Alonso 38' m Alejandra Fernández Maceiras 42' m Elsa Porto Vieiros 50' c Leyre Maria Bianchi Mira 70' m Maitane Buján Gómez 74' m Judit Hernández Modino 77' m Con: Ana Iglesias Sobrino (5) 5', 8', 32', 37', 51'; Alejandra Fernández Maceiras 56'		Cards: Carolina Fernanda Alfaro (yellow card) 72' to end'	Attendance: 200; Referee: José Luis Murillo García-Gil (FER)

13 April 2024	Silicius Majadahonda	32–13	Sant Cugat	Valle del Arcipreste, Majadahonda
16:00 CEST (UTC+2)	Try: Luisina Contreras (2) 36' c, 49' m Irene Garrido Peinado 40' m Denisse Gortázar Valverde 55' m Alicia Guío Pertíñez 78' c Con: Isabelle María Grisé 36'; Cristina López Calderón 78'; Pen: Cristina López Calderón 70'		Try: Marina García Mota 20' c Con: Zoé Marie Elise Bastide 20'; Pen: Zoé Marie Elise Bastide (2) 39', 62'	Attendance: 65; Referee: Lorena Martínez Fernández (FER)

==== Final ====
21 April 2024	CRAT Residencia Rialta	10–16	Silicius Majadahonda	Las Terrazas, Madrid
12:30 CEST (UTC+2)	Try: Elsa Porto Vieiros 31' m Alejandra Fernández Maceiras 39' m		Try: Cayetana Álvarez Serrano 21' c Con: Yelyzaveta Havrylova 22'; Pen: Yelyzaveta Havrylova 20'; Zahia Pérez Wilhelm 79'; Drop: Zahia Pérez Wilhelm 12'; Cards: Abril Martín De La Calle (yellow card) 52' to 62'	Referee: Íñigo Muñoz Cao (FER)
