= 2011–12 División de Honor Femenina de Rugby =

2011–12 División de Honor Femenina
- Countries: Spain
- Number of teams: 8
- Date: 22 October 2011 – 15 April 2012
- Champions: INEF Barcelona (9th title)
- Runners-up: CRAT Univesidade da Coruña
- Relegated: Sanse Scrum
- Matches played: 28
- Tries scored: 168 (average 6 per match)

The 2011–12 División de Honor Femenina de Rugby was the 2nd season of the División de Honor, the top flight of Spanish domestic women's rugby union competition. The reigning champions entering the season where INEF Barcelona who claimed their 8th title after winning all their matches in the previous edition.

INEF Barcelona won all their matches, and the championship, which was their 9th national title.

== Teams ==
2011–12 División de Honor Teams

Eight teams competed in the league – the top six teams from the previous season, Complutense Cisneros who were promoted as champions of the promotion regional tournament and Sanse Scrum, runner-ups of the promotion tournament, who won the relegation playoff against the previous season last placed.

This season Getxo Artea RT joined neighbouring teams Kakarraldo RT and Mungia RT to play under the name Bizkarians using the fields and players from the three teams.

Team	Head coach	Stadium	City
(Basque Country (autonomous community)) Bizkarians		Polideportivo Fadura	Getxo
(Community of Madrid) Complutense Cisneros	Darío Bernal	Campo Central CIU	Madrid
(Galicia (Spain)) CRAT Universidade da Coruña	Rogelio Sabio	Elviña	A Coruña
(Catalonia) G.E.i.E.G.	Coral Vila	Complex Esportiu Palau Sacosta	Girona
(Catalonia) INEF Barcelona	Víctor Marlet	Feixa Llarga	L'Hospitalet de Llobregat
(Community of Madrid) Majadahonda	Beatriz Muriel	Valle del Arcipreste	Majadahonda
(Community of Madrid) Olímpico de Pozuelo	Rocío Ramírez	Valle de las Cañas	Pozuelo de Alarcón
(Community of Madrid) Sanse Scrum		Centro Deportivo Dehesa Boyal	San Sebastián de los Reyes

== Table ==
Pos	Team	P	W	D	L	PF	PA	PD	BP	Pts
1	INEF Barcelona	7	7	0	0	191	58	133	4	32
2	CRAT Universidade da Coruña	7	6	0	1	204	84	120	7	31
3	Bizkarians	7	5	0	2	118	85	33	3	23
4	Majadahonda	7	4	0	3	133	96	37	4	20
5	Olímpico de Pozuelo	7	3	0	4	120	116	4	4	16
6	G.E.i.E.G.	7	2	0	5	101	174	-73	3	11
7	Complutense Cisneros	7	1	0	6	75	145	-70	3	7
8	Sanse Scrum	7	0	0	7	58	242	-184	1	1
Last placed relegated to Madrid regional tournament.

== Fixtures ==
=== Round 1 ===
22 October 2011	Olímpico de Pozuelo	12–27	Majadahonda (1BP)	Valle de las Cañas, Pozuelo de Alarcón
14:30 CEST (UTC+2)	Try: Ana María Aigneren Frodden; Raquel Fraguas Castellot; Con: Irene Schiavon Matteo		Try: Marina Bravo Bragado (2); Cristina González Cruz; Micaela Martínez Benavente; Marta Sánchez Cavadas; Con: Isis Velasco Morán

22 October 2011	(1BP) INEF Barcelona	42–5	G.E.i.E.G.	Feixa Llarga, L'Hospitalet de Llobregat
19:00 CEST (UTC+2)	Try: Ona Soler Antolinez (2); Raquel Erro Font; Aroa Gonzalez De La Concepcion +4 more Con: Meritxell Urbiola Coma		Try: Julia Pla Vegue	Referee: José Bogas (FER)

23 October 2011	Bizkarians	19–15	Complutense Cisneros (1BP)	Polideportivo Fadura, Getxo
12:00 CEST (UTC+2)	Try: Isabel Rodriguez Bergareche; Sara De La Llama Van Den Eynde; Ana Elisa Masa Pereiro; Con: Eva Rincon Ortiz (2)		Try: Alejandra De Castro Sardinero (2); Con: Beatriz Del Valle Millan; Pen: Beatriz Del Valle Millan

23 October 2011	Sanse Scrum	21–38	CRAT Universidade da Coruña (1BP)	Centro Deportivo Dehesa Boyal, San Sebastián de los Reyes
13:30 CEST (UTC+2)	Try: Paula Pancorbo Battaglio; Marina Antonio Rodriguez; Con: Marina Antonio Rodriguez; Pen: Irene Zapata Maiz (3)		Try: Rocío Garcia Eiras (2); Ana Vanesa Rial Lopez (2); Marta Calviño Forjan; Paula Medin Lopez; Con: Silvia Vazquez Vallo (4)

=== Round 2 ===
19 November 2011	(1BP) Majadahonda	39–5	Sanse Scrum	Valle del Arcipreste, Majadahonda
16:00 CET (UTC+1)	Try: Marina Bravo Bragado (2); Carmen Pareja Vicente; Marta Lliteras Ruiz; Isis Velasco Moran; María Casado Gonzalez; Chloe Gervoson; Con: Marina Bravo Bragado (2)		Try: Marta Medina González	Referee: Axel Ginhson (FER)

19 November 2011	(1BP) CRAT Universidade da Coruña	20–25	INEF Barcelona (1BP)	Elviña, A Coruña
16:45 CET (UTC+1)	Try: Mónica Castelo Mejuto 29' c Paula Medin Lopez (2) 57' m, 74' m Con: Elena Roca Moro 29'; Pen: Elena Roca Moro 13'		Try: Clara Costa Fábregas 7' m Laura Esbrí Anton (2) 18' m, 74' c Lali 21' m Con: Clara Costa Fábregas 74'; Pen: Clara Costa Fábregas 80'

20 November 2011	(1BP) Complutense Cisneros	13–14	Olímpico de Pozuelo	Campo Central CIU, Madrid
11:30 CET (UTC+1)	Try: Lia Bailan Zamora; Beatriz Paniagua Muñoz; Pen: Beatriz Del Valle Millan		Try: Lorena Martinez Gutierrez; Pen: Irene Schiavon Matteo +2 more

20 November 2011	G.E.i.E.G.	3–20	Bizkarians (1BP)	Complex Esportiu Palau Sacosta, Girona
12:00 CET (UTC+1)	Pen: Laia Gibert Martin		Try: Isabel Rodriguez Bergareche; Amets Castrejana Fernandez; Eva Rincon Ortiz; Begoña Ibáñez Martínez de la Hidalga

=== Round 3 ===
17 December 2011	(1BP) INEF Barcelona	20–5	Majadahonda	Feixa Llarga, L'Hospitalet de Llobregat
14:30 CET (UTC+1)	Try: Martina Pérez Casajuana (2); Ángela Del Pan Moruno; Laura Esbrí Anton		Try: Raquel Santiago Alvarez	Referee: Joan Aloy (FER)

17 December 2011	Sanse Scrum	5–34	Complutense Cisneros (1BP)	Centro Deportivo Dehesa Boyal, San Sebastián de los Reyes
17:00 CET (UTC+1)	Try: Carla Margalef Bentabol		Try: Alejandra De Castro Sardinero (4); Irene Heras Lizuain; Miryam Boerque Cascajo; Con: Natalia Santos Mosqueda (2)

18 December 2011	(1BP) G.E.i.E.G.	21–24	CRAT Universidade da Coruña (1BP)	Complex Esportiu Palau Sacosta, Girona
11:00 CET (UTC+1)	Try: Julia Pla Vegue (2) 8' c, 80+5'; Penalty Try 18' c Con: Laia Gibert Martin (3) 8', 18', 80+5'		Try: Rocío Garcia Eiras 20' c Ana Vanesa Rial Lopez (2) 53' m, 70' c Lucia Sanchez Diaz 66' m Con: Elena Roca Moro 20'; Noelia Pintor Iglesias 70'

18 December 2011	Bizkarians	10–5	Olímpico de Pozuelo (1BP)	Atxurizubi Kalea, Mungia
12:00 CET (UTC+1)	Try: Alba Herran Villahoz; Con: Eva Rincon Ortiz; Pen: Eva Rincon Ortiz		Try: María Sobrinos Martin

=== Round 4 ===
14 January 2012	(1BP) Olímpico de Pozuelo	38–10	Sanse Scrum	Valle de las Cañas, Pozuelo de Alarcón
16:00 CET (UTC+1)	Try: Ana María Aigneren Frodden (2); Elena Redondo Casado (2); Irene Schiavon Matteo; María Sobrinos Martin; Con: Irene Schiavon Matteo (4)		Try: Lidia Olivares Gómez; Marta Medina González

15 January 2012	(1BP) CRAT Universidade da Coruña	30–10	Bizkarians	Elviña, A Coruña
12:00 CET (UTC+1)	Try: Berta Garcia Alonso (2); Ana Vanesa Rial Lopez; Mónica Castelo Mejuto; Laura Vazquez Vallo; Con: Berta Garcia Alonso; Pen: Paula Medin Lopez		Try: Isabel Rodriguez Bergareche; Eva Rincon Ortiz

15 January 2012	Complutense Cisneros	5–17	INEF Barcelona	Campo Central CIU, Madrid
13:00 CET (UTC+1)	Try: Alejandra De Castro Sardinero		Try: Raquel Erro Font; Clara Costa Fabregas +1 more Con: Clara Costa Fabregas

15 January 2012	(1BP) Majadahonda	37–0	G.E.i.E.G.	Valle del Arcipreste, Majadahonda
14:00 CET (UTC+1)	Try: María Casado Gonzalez (2); Laura Gomez Almaraz; Marina Bravo Bragado; Laura Perez Martin; Cristina Gonzalez Cruz; Raquel Santiago Alvarez; Con: Marina Bravo Bragado

=== Round 5 ===
18 February 2012	INEF Barcelona	15–8	Olímpico de Pozuelo (1BP)	Feixa Llarga, L'Hospitalet de Llobregat
15:30 CET (UTC+1)	Try: Ángela Del Pan Moruno; Raquel Erro Font; Martina Pérez Casajuana		Try: Ana María Aigneren Frodden; Pen: Irene Schiavon Matteo	Referee: Eduard Martin Serralta (FER)

19 February 2012	Bizkarians	12–5	Sanse Scrum (1BP)	Campo de Rugby Ardanza, Plentzia
12:00 CET (UTC+1)	Try: Isabel Rodriguez Bergareche; Saioa Jaurena Atxa; Con: Eva Rincon Ortiz		Try: Pilar Marcos Rodríguez	Referee: Igotz Gallastegi (FER)

19 February 2012	(1BP) CRAT Universidade da Coruña	22–0	Majadahonda	Elviña, A Coruña
12:00 CET (UTC+1)	Try: Rocío Garcia Eiras (2); Berta Garcia Alonso; Turena Mikaela Lorie Cruz; Con: Elena Roca Moro

19 February 2012	(1BP) G.E.i.E.G.	22–3	Complutense Cisneros	Complex Esportiu Palau Sacosta, Girona
12:00 CET (UTC+1)	Try: Marta Cabane Pascual (3); Julia Pla Vegue; Con: Julia Pla Vegue		Pen: Ana Mínguez Herranz	Referee: Sergi Figueruelo (FER)

=== Round 6 ===
18 March 2012	Complutense Cisneros	0–48	CRAT Universidade da Coruña (1BP)	Campo de Rugby 18 de Octubre, Yuncos
12:00 CET (UTC+1)			Try: Rocío Garcia Eiras (2); Berta Garcia Alonso (2); Ana Vanesa Rial Lopez (2); Marta Calviño Forjan; Elena Roca Moro; Con: Elena Roca Moro (2); Berta Garcia Alonso (2)

18 March 2012	Sanse Scrum	0–50	INEF Barcelona (1BP)	Centro Deportivo Dehesa Boyal, San Sebastián de los Reyes
12:30 CET (UTC+1)			Try: Eulàlia Daví Borrell (3); Aroa Gonzalez De La Concepcion (2); Ángela Del Pan Moruno; Raquel Erro Font; Laura Esbrí Anton; Con: Meritxell Urbiola Coma (5)

18 March 2012	(1BP) Bizkarians	32–5	Majadahonda	Polideportivo Fadura, Getxo
13:00 CET (UTC+1)	Try: Isabel Rodriguez Bergareche (2); Bárbara Pla Vegue (2); Amaia Mentxaka Echevarria; Saioa Jaurena Atxa; Con: María Arriaga Telleria		Try: Marta Sanchez Espinosa	Referee: Pedro Montoya (FER)

18 March 2012	(1BP) Olímpico de Pozuelo	36–19	G.E.i.E.G.	Valle de las Cañas, Pozuelo de Alarcón
14:00 CET (UTC+1)	Try: Nuria Barrio Martinez; Lorena Martinez Gutierrez; Ana Gonzalo Payo; María Sobrinos Martin; Janina Buechner; Covadonga Abascal Alonso; Con: Elena Redondo Casado +2 more		Try: Anna Arnau Vidal; Julia Pla Vegue; Penalty Try; Con: Laia Gibert Martin (2)	Referee: Alfonso Mirat (FER)

=== Round 7 ===
14 April 2012	(1BP) Majadahonda	20–5	Complutense Cisneros	Valle del Arcipreste, Majadahonda
16:00 CEST (UTC+2)	Try: Laura Perez Martin (2); Marta Lliteras Ruiz; Micaela Martinez Benavente		Try: Alejandra De Castro Sardinero	Referee: Alfonso Mirat (FER)

15 April 2012	(1BP) G.E.i.E.G.	31–12	Sanse Scrum	Complex Esportiu Palau Sacosta, Girona
11:30 CEST (UTC+2)	Try: Julia Pla Vegue (4); Laura Llado Marti; Con: Laia Gibert Martin (3)		Try: Bibiana Gonzalez-Colaço Yañez-Sedeño; Cristina Yanara Soriano Palomo; Con: Bibiana Gonzalez-Colaço Yañez-Sedeño	Referee: Joan Aloy (FER)

15 April 2012	INEF Barcelona	22–15	Bizkarians (1BP)	Feixa Llarga, L'Hospitalet de Llobregat
12:30 CEST (UTC+2)	Try: Clara Costa Fabregas; Laura Esbrí Anton; Martina Pérez Casajuana; Con: Meritxell Urbiola Coma; Clara Costa Fabregas; Pen: Meritxell Urbiola Coma		Try: Amaia Garate Olano; Eva Rincon Ortiz; Bárbara Pla Vegue

15 April 2012	(1BP) CRAT Universidade da Coruña	22–7	Olímpico de Pozuelo	Elviña, A Coruña
12:30 CEST (UTC+2)	Try: Berta Garcia Alonso (2); Marta Calviño Forjan; Ana Vanesa Rial Lopez; Con: Elena Roca Moro		Try: Ana Crespo Ramírez; Con: Irene Schiavon Matteo
