= 2035 Rugby World Cup bids =

Host selection process for the 13th Men's Rugby World Cup

The host selection process for the 2035 Men's Rugby World Cup, the 13th edition of the tournament, was launched by World Rugby in September 2025, with expressions of interest opening the following month. As of 12 October 2026, three bids have been formally declared: Japan, a joint South American bid led by Argentina, and Spain. The South American and Spanish bids have both delivered their detailed questionnaires to World Rugby. Italy has expressed interest but has not formally entered the process.

== Selection process ==
Unlike previous cycles, the 2035 men's process is being run independently of the 2037 women's edition to allow for more tailored hosting strategies. World Rugby has stated that it will consider both single-country proposals and multi-territory consortiums. The bidding schedule is as follows:

Date	Phase
October 2025	Launch of Expressions of Interest
Q3 2026	Submission of detailed questionnaires
Late 2026 – Early 2027	Site visits & feasibility assessments
May 2027	Identification of preferred host
November 2027	Final appointment and announcement

As of October 2026, the process is in the phase of submitting detailed questionnaires, with site visits and feasibility assessments to follow.

World Rugby chief executive Alan Gilpin has indicated that the governing body is keen for the tournament to return to Europe in 2035, following the 2027 edition in Australia and the 2031 edition in the United States. In April 2025, Gilpin described this as a form of regional rotation between hosts.

== Confirmed bids ==
As of 12 October 2026, several nations have officially confirmed their intent to bid:

=== Japan ===
The Japan Rugby Football Union (JRFU) submitted its expression of interest on 14 January 2026, aiming to host the tournament for the second time, following the 2019 Rugby World Cup. Its campaign is built around the "No Side Spirit" concept, tied to the union's centenary year, with an accompanying logo. On 25 September 2026, the JRFU established the "Rugby World Cup 2035 Bid Advisory Committee" under an "All-Japan" framework uniting national and local government, the sports community, business and local communities. The bid committee is reportedly shortlisting eight to ten stadiums of at least 25,000 capacity to meet World Rugby's updated guidelines.

=== South America (Argentina, Brazil, Chile, and Uruguay) ===
The Unión Argentina de Rugby (UAR) announced its bid on 17 March 2026 during a formal visit from World Rugby CEO Alan Gilpin. The project is a regional effort led by Argentina in conjunction with Sudamérica Rugby, and would be the first time the tournament has been held in South America. On 5 October 2026, the region formally submitted its joint bid to World Rugby; if successful, all four countries would host matches. The bid promises support from national and state governments and cites the four countries' combined population of 283 million.

The plan involves 11 stadiums across 10 host cities, eight of them in Argentina. The bid is fronted by the recently redeveloped Estadio Monumental in Buenos Aires, which will undergo further expansion before 2035 regardless of the bid's success. Commentators have suggested that the bid may be at a disadvantage given World Rugby's reported preference for a European host and the staging of the 2031 tournament in North America.

The 10 proposed host cities of the South American bid. Argentina (dark blue), Brazil (green), Chile (red), Uruguay (light blue)

Proposed venues of the South American bid
Country	City	Province / region	Stadium	Capacity (Note: As of 2026.)
Argentina	Buenos Aires (Belgrano)	Buenos Aires (autonomous city)	Estadio Monumental	85,018 (Note: Before a planned expansion to around 101,000 seats.)
Argentina	Buenos Aires (Liniers)	Buenos Aires (autonomous city)	Estadio José Amalfitani	49,540
Argentina	Córdoba	Córdoba	Estadio Mario Alberto Kempes	57,000
Argentina	La Plata	Buenos Aires Province	Estadio Único Diego Armando Maradona	53,000
Argentina	Mendoza	Mendoza	Estadio Malvinas Argentinas	42,000
Argentina	Rosario	Santa Fe	Estadio Gigante de Arroyito	46,955
Argentina	Salta	Salta	Estadio Padre Ernesto Martearena	21,000
Argentina	Santiago del Estero	Santiago del Estero	Estadio Único Madre de Ciudades	30,000
Brazil	Rio de Janeiro	Rio de Janeiro	Estádio do Maracanã	73,139
Chile	Santiago	Metropolitan Region	Estadio Nacional Julio Martínez Prádanos	48,745
Uruguay	Montevideo	Montevideo	Estadio Centenario	60,235
Total (11 stadiums)				566,632

=== Spain ===
The Real Federación Española de Rugby (RFER) confirmed its bid in December 2025 and first presented its candidacy under the concept "Spain Connects Rugby" at the Gala del Rugby Español on 24 April 2026, held at the headquarters of the Spanish Olympic Committee. The RFER has secured partnerships with the Spanish government, La Liga, the Royal Spanish Football Federation, and other organisations. In September 2026, RFER president Juan Carlos Martín "Hansen" said Spain aimed to stage the best Rugby World Cup ever, citing the stadiums being prepared for the 2030 FIFA World Cup, the country's high-speed rail network and the potential of the Spanish broadcasting market.

On 6 October 2026, the RFER announced that it had delivered its Applicant Questionnaire to World Rugby within the deadline. On 8 October 2026, it presented the bid under the slogan "Bridge the World", stating that the bid was entering its second phase. The bid has the backing of the Spanish government, formalised through a declaration of the Council of Ministers, as well as La Liga, and the support of the autonomous communities of Andalusia, the Basque Country, Castile and León, Catalonia, the Community of Madrid and the Valencian Community as potential host regions. The RFER stated that eight of the proposed venues have capacities above 50,000 and that the tournament's first final with an attendance above 100,000 would be possible, and that 93 million rugby fans live within three hours' travel of Spain. The bid also sets out goals of tripling the number of rugby players in Spain by 2035, creating Rugby Centres of Excellence in host regions, and building a new national rugby stadium in Madrid.

Named proposed venues of the Spanish bid

Named proposed venues of the Spanish bid
Stadium	City	Region	Capacity (Note: As of 2026.)
Santiago Bernabéu	Madrid	Community of Madrid	83,186 (Note: Some databases list a lower figure, such as 78,297.)
Camp Nou	Barcelona	Catalonia	105,000 (Note: Planned capacity on completion of the ongoing redevelopment; about 62,652 seats are usable in 2026 while work continues.)
Estadio de La Cartuja	Seville	Andalusia	70,000
The RFER states that eight of its proposed venues exceed 50,000 capacity; the full list has not yet been published.

== Declined or withdrawn bids ==
=== Italy ===
In April 2025, World Rugby chairman Brett Robinson confirmed that Italy had expressed interest in bidding. The Federazione Italiana Rugby (FIR) has expressed interest in hosting the tournament, having previously bid unsuccessfully for the 2015 Rugby World Cup and 2019 Rugby World Cup. Italy is the only Six Nations nation never to have hosted a Rugby World Cup match. In 2023, the FIR stated that upgrading stadiums for UEFA Euro 2032 was a precondition for presenting an Italian candidacy for the 2035 men's and 2037 women's tournaments. In October 2026 the Andrea Duodo, president of Italian Rugby indicated that they would not be going forward with a bid for the 2035 tournament owing to a lack of suitable stadia, but did not rule out bidding for a future competition.

=== Middle East (Qatar, Saudi Arabia, and United Arab Emirates) ===
Qais Al Dhalai, president of Asia Rugby, stated in March 2025 that a joint bid between Qatar, the United Arab Emirates, and Saudi Arabia was "very likely." However, this announcement came before the news of Asia Rugby's suspension from the World Rugby Council. In April 2026, it was reported that Saudi Arabia had not submitted an expression of interest and had no plans to do so, reportedly owing to a change in the financial strategy of the Public Investment Fund. The joint Gulf proposal is likewise reported to have fallen through.

=== South Africa ===
South Africa last hosted the Rugby World Cup in 1995. South African sports minister Gayton McKenzie said in 2026 that he would not rest until the tournament returned to the country, but SA Rugby president Mark Alexander stated that the union had decided not to bid owing to the cost of upgrading its stadiums. As of October 2026, South Africa had not formally entered the process.
