= CR Arquitectura Técnica =

Spanish rugby union club, based in A Coruña

CRAT
- Full name: Club de Rugby Arquitectura Técnica
- Union: Spanish Rugby Federation
- Nickname(s): Aparelladores, Cratarians
- Founded: 1976; 50 years ago
- Location: A Coruña
- Ground: Elviña (Capacity: 1,500)
- President: Aurelio de Tena León
- Coach: Pablo Artime Muñiz
- Captain: Alba Rubial Lalín
- League: Liga Iberdrola
- 2023–24: 2nd
1st kit	2nd kit

Official website
- cratcoruna.com

The Club de Rugby Arquitectura Técnica, commonly referred to as CRAT, and currently known as CRAT Residencia Rialta for sponsorship purposes, is a Spanish rugby union club. The club currently competes in the Liga Iberdrola, the 1st level of Spanish women's club rugby, competition they have won 2 times. The men's team plays on the galician regional tournament. The club is based in the city of A Coruña, in the autonomous community of Galicia. They play in white and teal.

== History ==
The team was founded in October 1976 by Ignacio Lobón Tovar and a group of students from the architecture school of the University of A Coruña to compete on the Universities League.

== Honours ==
- Liga Iberdrola
  - Champions: (2) 2014–15, 2018–19
  - Runners–Up (5) 2010–11, 2011–12, 2013–14, 2016–17, 2023–24
- RFER Cup
  - Runners–Up (1) 2023–24
- 7s National Series/Queens Cup Grand Prix Series
  - Champions: (1) 2010–11
  - Runners–Up: (1) 2018–19
- Iberian Cup
  - Runners–Up: (1) 2019–20
