= Velódromo de Fadura =

Sports facility in Getxo, Biscay, Spain

Coordinates: 43.3517°N 3.0008°W

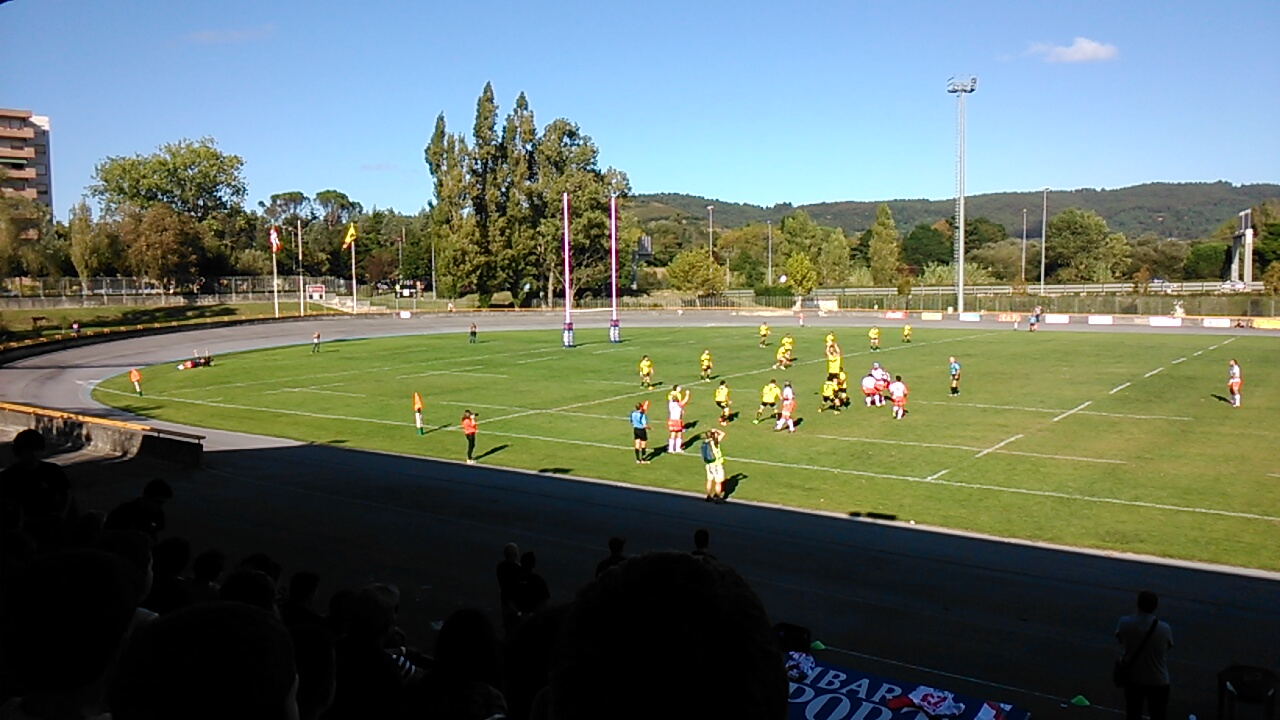
- Address: Getxo, Biscay; Spain
- Owner: Getxo City Council
- Operator: Getxo Artea RT
- Capacity: 1,000
- Opened: 1971

Velódromo de Fadura is a sports facility dedicated to the practices of cycling and rugby union, which forms part of Getxo Kirolak Fadura, in Getxo (Biscay).The facilities include athletics tracks, football and field hockey fields, pools, covered sports hall, gymnasiums and tennis pitches, which were built in the early 1960s.The side stand covered of the velodrome can house 1,000 seating spectators. Its oval track for bicycles is made of concrete.

In the rugby field surrounded by the track, Getxo Rugby Taldea plays its home matches of the División de Honor de Rugby. Its surface is natural grass.
