= Spanish Rugby Federation =

Governing body of rugby union in Spain

Royal Spanish Rugby Federation
Real Federación Española de Rugby
- Sport: Rugby union
- Founded: 1923; 103 years ago
- World Rugby affiliation: 1988
- Rugby Europe affiliation: 1934
- President: (Spain) Juan Carlos Martín (Hansen)
- Men's coach: (Argentina) Pablo Bouza
- Women's coach: (France) Régis Sonnes
- Website: www.ferugby.es

The Royal Spanish Rugby Federation (Spanish: Real Federación Española de Rugby) is the governing body for the sport of rugby union in Spain.

The Spanish Rugby Federation was founded in 1923, and joined the International Rugby Football Board, later known as the International Rugby Board and now as World Rugby, in 1988. It is located in Madrid.

The President of the Federation is Juan Carlos Martin Sanchez.

== History ==
=== 2035 Rugby World Cup Bid ===
In October 2026, the Spanish Rugby Federation put forward a proposal to host the 2035 Rugby World Cup. Under the proposal, the final would be held at the Camp Nou in Barcelona and, if successful, it would be the first time the final is held in front of a crowd of more than 100,000 fans. The Santiago Bernabéu in Madrid and Mestalla Stadium in Valencia would also be in line host major fixtures.

The proposal also aims to triple the number of people playing the sport in the country by 2035 and, ultimately, establish Spain as Tier One nation in the sport.

In the lead up to the 2035 tournament bidding process, the Federation announced they had also expressed interest in hosting the 2029 Champions Cup and Challenge Cup finals in Madrid and the 2030 Top14 in Barcelona. The European club tournaments had previously been hosted in San Mamés, Bilbao for both 2018 and 2016 campaigns, with the 2016 Top14 final having also been previously hosted at the Camp Nou. Juan Carlos Martin Sanchez, the President of the Federation, also revealed they had been in discussions with the United Rugby Championship to introduce a Spanish franchise, in addition to holding talks with EPCR about permitting a Spanish side in the Challenge Cup as soon as 2027.

In November 2026, with Qatar withdrawing from hosting rights to the 2028 Nations Championship final, the Spanish federation made an informal expression of interest to be named as the replacement hosts.

== See also ==
- Spain national rugby union team
- Spain women's national rugby union team
- Spain national rugby sevens team
- Spain women's national rugby sevens team
- Spain national under-20 rugby union team
- Rugby union in Spain
- División de Honor de Rugby (Spain's top tier domestic rugby union competition)
- División de Honor Élite de Rugby (Spain's second tier domestic rugby union competition, since 2025)
- División de Honor B de Rugby (Spain's third tier domestic rugby union competition)
