= 2021–22 Liga Iberdrola de Rugby =

- Countries: Spain
- Number of teams: 8
- Date: 2 October 2021 – 10 April 2022
- Champions: Corteva Cocos (2nd title)
- Runners-up: Majadahonda
- Relegated: Sanse Scrum
- Matches played: 59
- Tries scored: 421 (average 7.1 per match)
- Top point scorer: (France) Lea Ducher (Corteva Cocos) – 135 points
- Top try scorer: (United States) Tahlia Dawn Brody (Corteva Cocos) – 13 tries

Official website
- ferugby.es/calendario-liga-iberdrola

The 2021–22 Liga Iberdrola de Rugby was the 12th season of the Liga Iberdrola de Rugby, the top flight of Spanish domestic women's rugby union competition and the 6th to be sponsored by Iberdrola. The reigning champions entering the season where Complutense Cisneros who claimed their 1st league title after winning the 2020-21 final against Majadahonda.

== Teams ==
2021–22 Liga Iberdrola de Rugby Teams

Eight teams competed in the league – the top seven teams from the previous season and Sant Cugat who were promoted as champions of the 2020–21 Honor Division B. They replaced Les Abelles who were relegated after just one season in the top flight.

Team	Captain	Head coach	Stadium	Capacity	City
(Community of Madrid) Complutense Cisneros	Alba Vinuesa	Álvaro Montero	Campo Central CIU	12400	Madrid
(Andalusia) Corteva Cocos	Cristina González	Jesús Romero	La Cartuja	1932	Sevilla
(Galicia (Spain)) CRAT Residencia RIALTA	Alba Rubial	José Antonio Portos	Elviña	1500	A Coruña
(Basque Country (autonomous community)) Eibar Rugby Taldea	Amaiur Mayo	María Cristina Guntín	Unbe	600	Éibar
(Community of Madrid) Majadahonda	Marta Estellés	Jesús Delgado	Valle del Arcipreste	200	Majadahonda
(Community of Madrid) Olímpico de Pozuelo	Marta Iglesias	Daniel Mingo	Valle de las Cañas	300	Pozuelo de Alarcón
(Community of Madrid) Sanse Scrum	Carolina Fernanda Alfaro	Gustavo Andrés Paniagua	Las Terrazas	2000	Alcobendas
(Catalonia) Sant Cugat	Irene Aires	Albert Cassorran	ZEM La Guinardera	500	Sant Cugat del Vallès

== Table ==
Pos	Team	P	W	D	L	PF	PA	PD	TF	TA	TD	TBP	DBP	Pts
1	Majadahonda	14	10	1	3	553	259	294	87	39	48	9	2	53
2	Corteva Cocos	14	9	2	3	406	156	250	62	23	39	6	2	48
3	Olímpico de Pozuelo	14	8	2	4	262	239	23	38	38	0	3	1	40
4	Complutense Cisneros	14	8	1	5	350	265	85	56	41	15	4	2	40
5	Eibar Rugby Taldea	14	6	2	6	310	295	15	48	45	3	2	4	34
6	CRAT Residencia RIALTA	14	6	0	8	306	364	-58	48	54	-6	1	2	27
7	Sant Cugat	14	5	0	9	253	280	-27	40	44	-4	2	3	25
8	Sanse Scrum	14	0	0	14	110	692	-582	17	112	-95	0	1	1
First Four are play-off places. Second to last plays a relegation playoff against Honor Division B runner-up. Last placed relegated to Honor Division B.

== Regular season ==
=== Round 1 ===
5 March 2022	(TBP) Corteva Cocos	64–0	Sanse Scrum	La Cartuja, Seville
17:00 CET (UTC+1)	Try: Sasha Hallet-Mahuika (3) 1' c, 19' c, 28' c Ana Mamea 8' c Tahlia Dawn Brody (2) 24' c, 59' c Lucia Gayoso 45' c Marta Carmona (2) 68' m, 71' m Lea Ducher 74' m Con: Lea Ducher (7) 2', 9', 20', 25', 29', 46', 60'; Cards: Duna Gómez (yellow card) 35' to 45'	Report		Referee: José Luis Murillo

6 March 2022	Olímpico de Pozuelo	15–24	CRAT Residencia RIALTA	Valle de las Cañas, Pozuelo de Alarcón
11:00 CET (UTC+1)	Try: Luz Maria Martín 14' c Paloma Cabezas 53' m Con: Ana Marina Sánchez 15'; Pen: Ana Marina Sánchez 40'	Report	Try: Cecilia Huarte 8' m Isabel Martí (2) 47' c, 56' c Bárbara Murillo 74' m Con: Ana Iglesias (2) 48', 57'	Referee: Roger Parera

6 March 2022	Majadahonda	29–22	Complutense Cisneros (DBP)	Valle del Arcipreste, Majadahonda
12:30 CET (UTC+1)	Try: Maria Kimberly Marcos (2) 11' m, 36' c Raquel Santiago 40' m Claudia Pérez 56' m Alba Mireya Vives 76' c Con: Isis Velasco 37'; Cristina López 77'	Report	Try: Raquel Alonso 16' c Zahía Perez 26' m Inés Bueso-inchausti 53' c Con: Inés Bueso-inchausti 17'; Inmaculada Bargues 54'; Pen: Inés Bueso-inchausti 5'; Cards: Meral Acarlioglu (yellow card) 63' to 73'	Referee: Pedro José Pérez

6 March 2022	Eibar Rugby Taldea	19–12	Sant Cugat (DBP)	Unbe, Eibar
15:00 CET (UTC+1)	Try: Maika Brust 28' c Lucía Moya 55' c Uribarri Barrutieta 64' m Con: Lucía Moya 28'; Lide Erbina 56'; Cards: Lucía Moya (yellow card) 29' to 39'	Report	Try: Alysha Stone 8' c Elisabet Segarra 34' m Con: Ana María Iglesias 9'; Cards: Linda López (yellow card) 58' to 68'; Katheleen Keller (yellow card) 73' to 80'	Referee: Belarmino Álvarez

=== Round 2 ===
2 October 2021	CRAT Residencia RIALTA	7–15	Complutense Cisneros	Elviña, A Coruña
16:00 CEST (UTC+2)	Try: Tania Martínez 15' c Con: Ana Iglesias 15'; Cards: Isabel Fontanarrosa (yellow card) 22' to 32'	Report	Try: Alba María Alonso 29' c Alba Vinuesa 60' m Con: Inés Bueso-Inchausti 29'; Pen: Inés Bueso-inchausti 8'; Cards: Ana Vila (yellow card) 13' to 23'	Referee: David Joaquín Castro

2 October 2021	Sanse Scrum	24–55	Eibar Rugby Taldea (TBP)	Las Terrazas, Madrid
16:00 CEST (UTC+2)	Try: Lourdes Alameda (3) 9' m, 63' m, 79' c Carolina Fernanda Alfaro 28' c Con: Carolina Fernanda Alfaro (2) 29', 80'	Report	Try: Iera Echebarría (2) 1' c, 6' m Oraçao Sambu 19' m Amaiur Mayo (3) 22' c, 53' c, 69' m Aleuzenev Alejandra Cid 40' m Joana Murray 46' c Islam Chajrane 57' c Con: Lucía Moya (2) 2', 23'; Jessica Sarah Courtman (3) 47', 54', 58'; Cards: Iera Echebarría (yellow card) 26' to 36' (yellow card) 78' (red card)	Referee: Pedro José Pérez

2 October 2021	(DBP) Sant Cugat	14–15	Olímpico de Pozuelo	ZEM La Guinardera, Sant Cugat del Vallès
17:00 CEST (UTC+2)	Try: Paula Pou (2) 46' c, 62' c Con: Axelle Ramon (2) 47', 63'	Report	Try: Laura Arnaiz 10' m Cristina García 42' c Con: Silvia Morales 43'; Pen: Silvia Morales 72'; Cards: Lia Piñeiro (yellow card) 24' to 34'; Luz María Martín (yellow card) 62' to 72'	Referee: Eduard Martín

3 October 2021	(DBP) Majadahonda	8–15	Corteva Cocos	Valle del Arcipreste, Majadahonda
13:00 CEST (UTC+2)	Try: Carmen Rodera 56' m Pen: Cristina López 8'; Cards: Paula Hernandez (yellow card) 55' to 65'	Report	Try: Marta Carmona 18' m Lucía Gayoso 47' c Con: Blanca Ruíz 48'; Pen: Blanca Ruíz 14'	Referee: Andoni Susperregui

=== Round 3 ===
10 October 2021	Eibar Rugby Taldea	40–38	Majadahonda (DBP)	Unbe, Eibar
12:00 CEST (UTC+2)	Try: Joana Murray 14' c Iera Echebarría (2) 17' c, 37' c Amaiur Mayo 33' c Anne Fernández de Corres 56' c Aleuzenev Alejandra Cid 76' m Con: Jessica Sarah Courtman (5) 14', 17', 33', 37', 56'; Cards: Nahia Martínez (yellow card) 67' to 77'; Maitane Ibáñez (yellow card) 78' to 80'	Report	Try: Eva Aguirre (2) 8' c, 79' c Maria Kimberly Marcos (2) 45' m, 53' m Vico Gorrochategui 64' c Luisa Pérez 71' c Con: Jade Cardouat (2) 8', 64'; Marta Pro (2) 71', 79'	Referee: Eki Fanlo

10 October 2021	(TBP) Olímpico de Pozuelo	31–0	Sanse Scrum	Valle de las Cañas, Pozuelo de Alarcón
12:30 CEST (UTC+2)	Try: Laura Arnaiz (2) 6' m, 79' c Luz María Martín 17' c Beatriz Sanjurjo 32' c Beatriz Cabo 39' m Con: Ana Marina Sánchez 17'; Mar Ruiz (2) 32', 79'	Report	Cards: Lourdes Alameda (yellow card) 71' to 80'	Referee: Jorge García

10 October 2021	Complutense Cisneros	20–0	Corteva Cocos	Campo Central CIU, Madrid
13:30 CEST (UTC+2)	Try: Alba Vinuesa 35' c Alba María Alonso 57' c Con: Inés Bueso-Inchausti (2) 36', 58'; Pen: Inés Bueso-Inchausti (2) 8', 63'	Report	Cards: María De Las Huertas Román (yellow card) 5' to 15'	Referee: Roger Parera

10 October 2021	CRAT Residencia RIALTA	33–26	Sant Cugat (DBP)	Elviña, A Coruña
16:00 CEST (UTC+2)	Try: Paula Medin 7' m Claudia Barrio 14' c Maria Vega 37' c Maitane Bujan 40' c Isabel Martí 67' c Con: Ana Iglesias (4) 14', 38', 40', 68'	Report	Try: Raquel García 50' m Paula Nieto (2) 59' m, 78' m Sara Buetas 72' m Pen: Axelle Ramon 6'; Ana Maria Iglesias 15'	Referee: Belarmino Álvarez

=== Round 4 ===
23 October 2021	(TBP) Majadahonda	45–28	Olímpico de Pozuelo	Valle del Arcipreste, Majadahonda
13:30 CEST (UTC+2)	Try: Lucia Díaz (2) 15' c, 53', c Claudia Pérez (3) 35' m, 61' c, 64' m Cristina López 42' c Carmen Rodera 57' c Con: Cristina López (5) 16', 43', 54', 58', 62'; Cards: Cristina López (yellow card) 25' to 35'	Report	Try: Sidorela Bracic 31' c Ana Marina Sánchez 38' c Natalia Ortega 50' c Silvia Morales 68' c Con: Mar Ruiz (2) 32', 51'; Ana Marina Sánchez 39'; Paula Feito 69'	Referee: Iñaki Muñoz

23 October 2021	Sant Cugat	13–43	Complutense Cisneros (TBP)	ZEM La Guinardera, Sant Cugat del Vallès
16:00 CEST (UTC+2)	Try: Paula Pou 30' m Axelle Ramon 50' m Pen: Axelle Ramon 24'; Cards: Ilham Chouaib (yellow card) 19' to 29'	Report	Try: Paula Gil 21' m Iciar Pozo 33' c Blanca Die 38' m Inés Bueso-Inchausti 45' c Olivia Fresneda 60' m Celia Dávila 70' c María Calvo 72' c Con: Inés Bueso-Inchausti (4) 33', 45', 70', 72'	Referee: Joaquín Santoro

24 October 2021	Corteva Cocos	23–19	Eibar Rugby Taldea (DBP)	La Cartuja, Seville
11:30 CEST (UTC+2)	Try: Marta Carmona 1' m María De Las Huertas Román 50' c Lea Ducher 59' m Con: Lea Ducher 51'; Pen: Lea Ducher (2) 17', 40'; Cards: Sasha Hallet-Mahuika (yellow card) 74' to 80'	Report	Try: Aleuzenev Alejandra Cid 22' c Asmae Ourdi 31' c Amaiur Mayo 76' m Con: Lucía Moya (2) 23', 32'	Referee: Luis Fernández

24 October 2021	(DBP) Sanse Scrum	20–24	CRAT Residencia RIALTA	Las Terrazas, Madrid
12:30 CEST (UTC+2)	Try: Carolina Fernanda Alfaro 48' m Beatriz Dominguez (2) 57' c, 70' m Con: Carolina Fernanda Alfaro 58'; Pen: Carolina Fernanda Alfaro 40'	Report	Try: Tania Martínez 6' m Isabel Martí 17' c Paula Medin 45' m Estela Salinas 53' c Con: Ana Iglesias (2) 18', 54'; Cards: Maitane Buján (yellow card) 62' to 72'; Mariana Carolina Romero (yellow card) 67' to 77'; Jessica Martin (yellow card) 69' to 79'	Referee: Roger Parera

=== Round 5 ===
31 October 2021	(TBP) Sant Cugat	50–0	Sanse Scrum	ZEM La Guinardera, Sant Cugat del Vallès
12:00 CET (UTC+1)	Try: Ana María Iglesias 3' c Axelle Ramon 8' c Raquel García 28' c Mª Victoria Gil 31' c Carla Arca 40' m Alysha Stone 48' m Paula Nieto 63' c Ilham Chouaib 71' m Con: Ana María Iglesias (5) 4', 9', 29', 32', 64'	Report		Referee: Roger Parera

31 October 2021	CRAT Residencia RIALTA	7–33	Majadahonda (TBP)	Elviña, A Coruña
12:00 CET (UTC+1)	Try: Jessica Martin 22' c Con: Ana Iglesias 22'; Cards: Ana Iglesias (yellow card) 29' to 39'	Report	Try: Cristina López (2) 6' m, 39' c Penalty Try (2) 18', 30'; Alba Mireya Vives 44' c Con: Cristina López (2) 39', 44'; Cards: Vico Gorrochategui (yellow card) 68' to 78'	Referee: David Joaquín Castro

31 October 2021	Complutense Cisneros	17–17	Eibar Rugby Taldea	Campo Central CIU, Madrid
12:00 CET (UTC+1)	Try: Elsa Del Pino 39' c Claudia Urbizu 52' c Con: Raquel Alonso 40'; Zahía Perez 53'; Pen: Zahía Perez 73'; Cards: Inas El Ammouri (yellow card) 57' to 67'	Report	Try: Maika Brust 3' m Joana Murray 65' c Aleuzenev Alejandra Cid 78' m Con: Lucía Moya 66'	Referee: Iñaki Muñoz

31 October 2021	Olímpico de Pozuelo	14–14	Corteva Cocos	Valle de las Cañas, Pozuelo de Alarcón
13:00 CET (UTC+1)	Try: Beatriz Sanjurjo 11' c Penalty Try 79'; Con: Mar Ruiz 11'	Report	Try: Marta Carmona 14' c Irene Pascual 18' c Con: Marta Carmona 15'; Lea Ducher 18'; Cards: Kassandra Sylla (yellow card) 50' to 60'	Referee: Joaquín Santoro

=== Round 6 ===
13 November 2021	(TBP) Majadahonda	26–5	Sant Cugat	Valle del Arcipreste, Majadahonda
16:00 CET (UTC+1)	Try: Penalty Try 7'; Marta Fresno 34' t Marta Pro 56' m Macarena Del Valle 68' c Con: Jade Cardouat 34'; Marta Pro 68'	Report	Try: Paula Pou 14' m Cards: Linda López (yellow card) 47' to 57'; Elisabet Segarra (yellow card) 58' to 68'	Referee: Joaquín Santoro

13 November 2021	Eibar Rugby Taldea	12–6	Olímpico de Pozuelo (DBP)	Unbe, Eibar
16:00 CET (UTC+1)	Try: Maika Brust 17' m Anne Fernández De Corres 75' c Con: Lucia Moya 75'; Cards: Maika Brust (yellow card) 19' to 29'	Report	Pen: Ana Marina Sanchez (2) 27', 60'; Cards: Natalia Ortega (yellow card) 69' to 79'	Referee: David Joaquín Castro

14 November 2021	(TBP) Corteva Cocos	48–7	CRAT Residencia RIALTA	La Cartuja, Seville
11:30 CET (UTC+1)	Try: Sasha Hallet-Mahuika (2) 4' m, 42' m Marta Carmona 18' m Kassandra Sylla 29' c Easter Isadorra Aimasi Savelio 45' c Julia Castro 74' m Tahlia Dawn Brody 78' c Lea Ducher 80' c Con: Lea Ducher (4) 30', 46', 79', 80'; Cards: Easter Isadorra Aimasi Savelio (yellow card) 57' to 67'; Sasha Hallet-Mahuika (red card) 60'	Report	Try: Isabel Martí 57' c Con: Estela Salinas 58'	Referee: Luis Lasala

14 November 2021	Sanse Scrum	0–60	Complutense Cisneros (TBP)	Las Terrazas, Madrid
12:00 CET (UTC+1)		Report	Try: Zahía Pérez (2) 2' m, 12' c Ingrid Algar (2) 14' m, 50' c Alba Vinuesa 18' c Blanca Die 26' m Inés Bueso-Inchausti 45' c María Calvo 63' c Alejandra Castejón 70' m Olivia Fresneda 77' m Con: Inés Bueso-Inchausti (2) 13', 19'; Zahía Perez (3) 46', 51', 64'; Cards: Inas El Ammouri (yellow card) 34' to 44'	Referee: Iñaki Muñoz

=== Round 7 ===
20 November 2021	Olímpico de Pozuelo	17–10	Complutense Cisneros (DBP)	Valle de las Cañas, Pozuelo de Alarcón
16:00 CET (UTC+1)	Try: Beatriz Cabo 22' c Marina Martin 50' c Con: Ana Marina Sánchez (2) 22', 50'; Pen: Ana Marina Sánchez 3'	Report	Try: Alba María Alonso 45' c Con: Zahía Pérez 45'; Pen: Zahía Pérez 12'	Referee: Joaquín Santoro

21 November 2021	Sanse Scrum	0–77	Majadahonda (TBP)	Las Terrazas, Madrid
12:00 CET (UTC+1)		Report	Try: Claudia Pérez (2) 1' c, 27' m Bruna Elias (2) 7' c, 62' c Macarena Del Valle 10' m Rocio Rodera 20' m Isabel Romón (2) 31' m, 46' c Luisa Pérez 37' c Marta Pro 57' m Cristina López 60' m Maria Kimberly Marcos (2) 70' c, 79' m Con: Cristina López (4) 2', 8', 38', 47'; Marta Pro (2) 63', 71'	Referee: Luis Lasala

21 November 2021	CRAT Residencia RIALTA	13–7	Eibar Rugby Taldea (DBP)	Elviña, A Coruña
12:00 CET (UTC+1)	Try: Estela Salinas 7' m Leyre Maria Bianchi 32' c Pen: Ana Iglesias 62'	Report	Try: Maika Brust 65' c Con: Lucia Moya 66'	Referee: Luis Fernández

21 November 2021	Sant Cugat	12–10	Corteva Cocos (DBP)	ZEM La Guinardera, Sant Cugat del Vallès
12:30 CET (UTC+1)	Try: Sara Marin 26' m Raquel Garcia 61' c Con: Axelle Ramon 62'	Report	Try: Cristina Cabas 15' m Tahlia Dawn Brody 77' m Cards: Easter Isadorra Aimasi Savelio (red card) 32'	Referee: José Luis Murillo

=== Round 8 ===
27 November 2021	Sant Cugat	0–21	Eibar Rugby Taldea (TBP)	ZEM La Guinardera, Sant Cugat del Vallès
12:00 CET (UTC+1)		Report (Note: Match suspended for lack of doctor on the pitch. Eibar awarded bonus point win.)		Referee: Luis Lasala

28 November 2021	(DBP) CRAT Residencia RIALTA	19–24	Olímpico de Pozuelo	Elviña, A Coruña
12:00 CET (UTC+1)	Try: Jessica Martin 16' c Cecilia Huarte 43' m Ana Montero 55' c Con: Ana Iglesias (2) 17', 56'	Report	Try: Sidorela Bracic 12' c Ana Marina Sánchez 67' c Natalia Ortega 78' c Con: Ana Marina Sánchez (3) 13', 68', 79'; Pen: Ana Marina Sánchez 48'	Referee: Félix Villegas

28 November 2021	Complutense Cisneros	20–62	Majadahonda (TBP)	Campo Central CIU, Madrid
14:00 CET (UTC+1)	Try: Zahía Pérez 11' m Arantzazu Olabarria 49' m Alba Vinuesa 67' m Inas El Ammouri 77' m	Report	Try: Claudia Pérez (2) 8' c, 23' m Alba Mireya Vives (2) 18' c, 43' c Vico Gorrochategui 28' c Marta Estellés 39' c Carmen Rodera 52' m Lucia Díaz 60' m Marta Fresno 70' c Teresa Rey 80' m Con: Cristina López (6) 9', 19', 29', 40', 44', 71'	Referee: Pedro Montoya

28 November 2021	Sanse Scrum	7–62	Corteva Cocos (TBP)	Las Terrazas, Madrid
15:30 CET (UTC+1)	Try: Lucía López 79' c Con: Carolina Fernanda Alfaro 80'	Report	Try: Marta Carmona (2) 3' m, 28' c Tahlia Dawn Brody (3) 5' c, 46' m, 56' c Marta Chacartegui 8' m Ana Mamea 24' m Duna Gómez 44' c Irene Pascual 64' c Cristina Cabas 73' c Con: Marta Carmona (4) 6', 29', 45', 65'; Elena Peces (2) 57', 74'; Cards: Cristina Casas (yellow card) 79' to 80'	Referee: Roger Parera

=== Round 9 ===
11 December 2021	(TBP) Corteva Cocos	40–19	Majadahonda	La Cartuja, Seville
16:00 CET (UTC+1)	Try: Margarita Rodríguez 4' c Easter Isadorra Aimasi Savelio (2) 21' c, 78' m Marta Carmona (2) 27' c, 55' c Duna Gómez 63' c Con: Lea Ducher (5) 4', 21', 27', 55', 63'; Cards: Ana Mamea (yellow card) 7' to 17'; Kassandra Sylla (yellow card) 50' to 60'	Report	Try: Alba Mireya Vives (2) 42' c, 59' c Bruna Elias 75' m Con: Cristina López 42'; Jade Cardouat 59'	Referee: Joaquín Santoro

11 December 2021	Olímpico de Pozuelo	20–10	Sant Cugat	Valle de las Cañas, Pozuelo de Alarcón
16:30 CET (UTC+1)	Try: María Manglano 38' m Silvia Morales 45' c Paloma García De Prado 72' m Con: Ana Marina Sánchez 46'; Pen: Ana Marina Sánchez 80'	Report	Try: Elisabet Segarra 42' m Paula Nieto 76' m	Referee: Luis Lasala

12 December 2021	Eibar Rugby Taldea	33–23	Sanse Scrum	Polideportivo El Fango Lokatza Kiroldegia, Bilbao
12:30 CET (UTC+1)	Try: Asmae Ourdi (2) 25' c, 40' m Maika Brust 28' c Amaiur Mayo 70' c Uribarri Barrutieta 80' c Con: Lucía Moya (4) 26', 29', 71', 80'	Report	Try: Beatriz Domínguez 19' m Lourdes Alameda 47' m Raquel Sánchez 56' m Laura Madero 65' m Pen: Carolina Fernanda Alfaro 3'	Referee: David Joaquín Castro

16 January 2022	(TBP) Complutense Cisneros	43–17	CRAT Residencia RIALTA	Campo Central CIU, Madrid
12:30 CET (UTC+1)	Try: Oara Bautista 4' c Meral Acarlioglu 33' m Pilar Rico 37' m Elsa Del Pino 52' c Paula Gil 58' m Zahía Pérez 64' c Penalty Try 76'; Con: Inés Bueso-Inchausti (3) 4', 52', 64'	Report	Try: Isabel Martí 8' c Judith Hernández 20' m Isabel Fontanarrosa 70' m Con: Ana Iglesias 8'; Cards: Ana Montero (yellow card) 50' to 60'; Coro Repullés (yellow card) 76' to 80'	Referee: Joaquín Santoro

=== Round 10 ===
18 December 2021	Sant Cugat	28–22	CRAT Residencia RIALTA (DBP)	ZEM La Guinardera, Sant Cugat del Vallès
14:30 CET (UTC+1)	Try: Mª Victoria Gil 1' c Ana Maria Iglesias 32' c Alysha Stone 53' c Elisabet Segarra 68' c Con: Ana Maria Iglesias (4) 2', 33', 54', 69'; Cards: Mª Victoria Gil (yellow card) 43' to 53'	Report	Try: Cecilia Huarte (3) 4' m, 35' c, 46' m Isabel Martí 74' m Con: Isabel Fontanarrosa 36'	Referee: Roger Parera

18 December 2021	Corteva Cocos	24–7	Complutense Cisneros	La Cartuja, Seville
15:00 CET (UTC+1)	Try: Lea Ducher 15' c Lucía Gayoso 31' c Jocelyn Jones 60' c Con: Lea Ducher (3) 15', 31', 60'; Pen: Lea Ducher 48'; Cards: Ana Serrano (yellow card) 67' to 77'; Easter Isadorra Aimasi Savelio (yellow card) 75' to 80'	Report	Try: Camilia Hamze 76' c Con: Elisa Álvarez 76'; Cards: Paula Gil (yellow card) 40' to 50'; Alba María Alonso (yellow card) 58' to 68'	Referee: Eki Fanlo

18 December 2021	(TBP) Majadahonda	49–21	Eibar Rugby Taldea	Valle del Arcipreste, Majadahonda
16:00 CET (UTC+1)	Try: Marta Pro 8' m Claudia Pérez 22' m Alba Mireya Vives 28' c Bruna Elias (2) 44' c, 58' c Lucía Díaz 54' m Rocio Rodera 62' m Blanca Palacios 80' m Con: Cristina López (3) 29', 45', 59'; Pen: Cristina López 39'	Report	Try: Emma Lee Taruke Cleary (2) 5' c, 34' c Amaiur Mayo 75' c Con: Lucía Moya (2) 6', 35'; Leire Muñoz 76'; Cards: Doha Benslaiman (yellow card) 51' to 61'	Referee: José Luis Murillo

15 January 2022	Sanse Scrum	0–15	Olímpico de Pozuelo (TBP)	Las Terrazas, Madrid
17:00 CET (UTC+1)		Report	Try: Paloma Cabezas 47' m Paloma Garcia De Prado 62' m Maria Del Castillo 72' m	Referee: Luis Lasala

=== Round 11 ===
29 January 2022	Olímpico de Pozuelo	31–31	Majadahonda	Valle de las Cañas, Pozuelo de Alarcón
12:00 CET (UTC+1)	Try: Irene Schiavon (2) 14' c, 25' c María Del Castillo 60' m Amaya Rascón 71' m Paloma Cabezas 80' c Con: Ana Marina Sánchez (3) 15', 26', 80'	Report	Try: Macarena Del Valle 30' c Silvia Hernandez-Vaquero 36' c Maria Kimberly Marcos 54' c Lucía Díaz 60' m Claudia Pérez 77' m Con: Cristina López (2) 31', 37'; Laura Serrano 55'	Referee: Miguel Fernández

30 January 2022	Eibar Rugby Taldea	12–12	Corteva Cocos	Unbe, Eibar
11:00 CET (UTC+1)	Try: Uribarri Barrutieta 38' m Nerea García 72' c Con: Lucia Moya 73'; Cards: Asmae Ourdi (yellow card) 64' to 74'	Report	Try: Ana Mamea 23' m Marta Carmona 66' c Con: Marta Carmona 67'; Cards: Blanca Ruíz (yellow card) 35' to 45'	Referee: Félix Villegas

30 January 2022	(TBP) CRAT Residencia RIALTA	73–7	Sanse Scrum	Elviña, A Coruña
12:00 CET (UTC+1)	Try: Isabel Fontanarrosa (2) 3' m, 80' c Estela Salinas (2) 6' c, 16' c Isabel Martí (4) 8' c, 25' c, 42' c, 63' c Sara Antunez 31' m Judith Hernández (2) 50' c, 72' c Con: Ana Iglesias (9) 7', 9', 17', 26', 43', 51', 64', 73', 80'	Report	Try: Elena Milagros Jiménez 68' c Con: Carolina Fernanda Alfaro 69'	Referee: José Luis Murillo

19 February 2022	Complutense Cisneros	17–8	Sant Cugat	Campo Central CIU, Madrid
16:00 CET (UTC+1)	Try: Arantzazu Olabarria (2) 24' c, 48' m Celia Dávila 62' m Con: Inés Bueso-Inchausti 25'	Report	Try: Laia Azorín 43' m Pen: Ana María Iglesias 18'; Cards: Carla Rodríguez (yellow card) 57' to 67'	Referee: Andoni Susperregui

=== Round 12 ===
20 March 2022	(TBP) Majadahonda	42–19	CRAT Residencia RIALTA	Valle del Arcipreste, Majadahonda
12:00 CET (UTC+1)	Try: Eva Aguirre (2) 13' c, 53' c Alba Mireya Vives (2) 37' c, 77' c Cristina López (2) 63' c, 68' c Con: Cristina López (6) 14', 38', 54', 64', 69', 78'	Report	Try: Isabel Martí 35' m Isabel Fontanarrosa 39' c Estela Salinas 50' c Con: Ana Iglesias (2) 40', 51'	Referee: Pedro Montoya

20 March 2022	(TBP) Corteva Cocos	38–0	Olímpico de Pozuelo	La Cartuja, Seville
13:00 CET (UTC+1)	Try: Julia Castro 4' c Ana Mamea 23' c Beatriz Baraia-Etxaburu 35' m Cristina Cabas 47' c Sasha Hallet-Mahuika 60' c Tahlia Dawn Brody 77' m Con: Lea Ducher (4) 5', 24', 48', 61'; Cards: Sasha Hallet-Mahuika (yellow card) 39' to 49'	Report		Referee: Roger Parera

20 March 2022	(DBP) Eibar Rugby Taldea	21–27	Complutense Cisneros	Unbe, Eibar
13:00 CET (UTC+1)	Try: Maika Brust (2) 28' c, 35' c Amaiur Mayo 44' c Con: Lucía Moya (3) 29', 35', 45'; Cards: Aleuzenev Alejandra Cid (yellow card) 62' to 72'; Doha Benslaiman (yellow card) 72' to 82'	Report	Try: Iciar Pozo (3) 3' m, 38' m, 59' c Celia Dávila 65' m Pilar Rico 75' m Con: Zahía Perez 60'; Cards: Olivia Fresneda (yellow card) 32' to 42'	Referee: David Joaquín Castro

20 March 2022	Sanse Scrum	7–41	Sant Cugat (TBP)	Las Terrazas, Madrid
16:00 CET (UTC+1)	Try: Carolina Fernanda Alfaro 27' c Con: Carolina Fernanda Alfaro 27'; Cards: Marta Bailador (yellow card) 66' to 76'	Report	Try: Elisabet Segarra (2) 1' c, 76' c Alysha Stone (2) 15' m, 21' c Axelle Ramon 55' m Mª Victoria Gil 67' m Carla Arca 72' m Con: Ana María Iglesias (2) 1', 21'; Axelle Ramon 76'	Referee: Eki Fanlo

=== Round 13 ===
12 February 2022	(TBP) Complutense Cisneros	39–19	Sanse Scrum	Campo Central CIU, Madrid
12:00 CET (UTC+1)	Try: Arantzazu Olabarria 1' c Iciar Pozo 30' m Pilar Rico (2) 35' c, 39' m Olivia Fresneda (2) 52' m, 72' m Alba María Alonso 76' m Con: Raquel Alonso (2) 1', 35'	Report	Try: Carolina Fernanda Alfaro 10' c Beatriz Domínguez 46' c Edris Acuña 62' m Con: Carolina Fernanda Alfaro (2) 10', 46'	Referee: Joaquín Santoro

12 February 2022	Sant Cugat	8–26	Majadahonda (TBP)	ZEM La Guinardera, Sant Cugat del Vallès
15:00 CET (UTC+1)	Try: Elsa Porto 5' m Pen: Ana María Iglesias 34'; Cards: Alisson Peña (yellow card) 74' to 80'	Report	Try: Eva Aguirre (2) 12' c, 43' c Alba Mireya Vives 40' m Bruna Elias 46' c Con: Cristina López (3) 13', 44', 47'	Referee: Luis Lasala

13 February 2022	CRAT Residencia RIALTA	5–35	Corteva Cocos (TBP)	Elviña, A Coruña
12:00 CET (UTC+1)	Try: Erika Scott 43' m	Report	Try: Lea Ducher (2) 16' c, 72' m Marta Chacartegui 29' m Tahlia Dawn Brody 33' m Blanca Ruíz 38' c Con: Lea Ducher (2) 17' 39'; Pen: Lea Ducher (2) 2', 10'	Referee: Iñaki Muñoz

13 February 2022	Olímpico de Pozuelo	15–12	Eibar Rugby Taldea (DBP)	Valle de las Cañas, Pozuelo de Alarcón
12:00 CET (UTC+1)	Try: María Del Castillo 19' m Luz María Martín 22' c Con: Mar Ruiz 23'; Pen: Ana Marina Sánchez 52'	Report	Try: Aleuzenev Alejandra Cid 13' c Oraçao Sambu 36' m Con: Lucía Moya 14'	Referee: José Luis Murillo

=== Round 14 ===
26 March 2022	(TBP) Majadahonda	68–3	Sanse Scrum	Valle del Arcipreste, Majadahonda
16:00 CET (UTC+1)	Try: Isabel Romón 2' c Cristina Cueto 9' c Claudia Pérez 14' m Maria Kimberly Marcos (2) 17' c, 35' c Alba Mireya Vives 33' c Isis Velasco (2) 50' c, 64' c Marta Cantabrana 55' c Vico Gorrochategui 68' c Con: Jade Cardouat (5) 3', 10', 18', 34', 36'; Isis Velasco (4) 51', 56', 65', 69'; Cards: Blanca Palacios (yellow card) 26' to 36'; Claudia Pérez (yellow card) 37' to 47'	Report	Pen: Carolina Fernanda Alfaro 7'	Referee: Félix Villegas

27 March 2022	Eibar Rugby Taldea	21–36	CRAT Residencia RIALTA	Unbe, Eibar
12:00 CEST (UTC+2)	Try: Maika Brust 6' c Aleuzenev Alejandra Cid 64' c Asmae Ourdi 73' c Con: Lucia Moya (3) 6', 64', 73'; Cards: Nerea García (yellow card) 3' to 13'	Report	Try: Erika Scott (2) 32' c, 78' c Judith Hernández 40' c Claudia Barrio 43' c Tania Martínez 80' m Con: Alejandra Fernández 32'; Tania Martínez 40'; Ana Iglesias 43'; Alba Rubial 78'; Pen: Ana Iglesias 39'; Cards: Elena Martínez (yellow card) 38' to 48'	Referee: Belarmino Álvarez

27 March 2022	Complutense Cisneros	10–31	Olímpico de Pozuelo (TBP)	Campo Central CIU, Madrid
12:30 CEST (UTC+2)	Try: Alejandra Castejón 19' m Lucía Malagón 55' m Cards: Alejandra Castejón (yellow card) 39' to 49'; Raquel Alonso (red card) 51'	Report	Try: Beatriz Cabo 6' c Laura Arnaiz 25' m Amanda Prado (2) 32' c, 42' m Luz María Martín 71' c Con: Ana Marina Sánchez (3) 7', 33', 72'; Cards: Amaya Rascon (yellow card) 67' to 77'; Natalia Ortega (yellow card) 73' to 80'	Referee: Pedro José Pérez

27 March 2022	(DBP) Corteva Cocos	21–26	Sant Cugat	La Cartuja, Seville
14:00 CEST (UTC+2)	Try: Tahlia Dawn Brody (3) 30' c, 40' c, 42' c Con: Lola Gracia (3) 30', 40', 42'; Cards: Sasha Hallet-Mahuika (yellow card) 33' to 43'	Report	Try: Beatriz González 15' m Carla Arca 64' c Alysha Stone (2) 75' c, 80' c Con: Axelle Ramon (3) 64', 75', 80'	Referee: Joaquín Santoro

== Relegation playoff ==
The team finishing in 7th place faces the runner-up of the Honor Division B, with the winner of this match playing in the 2022–23 Liga Iberdrola and the loser in the 2022–23 Honor Division B.

24 February 2022	Sant Cugat	31–24	Les Abelles	Pinares de Venecia, Zaragoza
14:00 CEST (UTC+2)	Try: Montserrat Leuga 1' m Ana María Iglesias 29' c Raquel García 41' c Alysha Stone 45' c Katheleen Keller 67' m Con: Axelle Ramón (2) 30', 42'; Ana María Iglesias 46'; Cards: Meritxell Tur (yellow card) 56' to 66'; Raquel García (yellow card) 76' to 80'	Report	Try: Irene Noguera (2) 12' m, 37' c Carla Ferrando 59' c Marta Siurana 70' m Con: Ester López (2) 37', 60'	Referee: Victor Navarro

== Play-offs ==
Semi-finals
1	Majadahonda	29
4	Complutense Cisneros	24
2	Corteva Cocos	40
3	Olímpico de Pozuelo	16

Final
2	Corteva Cocos	36
1	Majadahonda	29

=== Semi-finals ===
2 April 2022	Majadahonda	29–24	Complutense Cisneros	Valle del Arcipreste, Majadahonda
14:00 CEST (UTC+2)	Try: Vico Gorrochategui (3) 21' m, 37' c, 64' m Lucía Díaz 50' m Carmen Rodera 67' c Con: Cristina López 38'; Jade Cardouat 68'	Report	Try: Celia Dávila 2' c Zahía Perez 26' m Margarita Blanco 55' c Alba María Alonso 78' m Con: Inés Bueso-Inchausti (2) 3', 56'; Cards: Casandra López (yellow card) 36' to 46'	Referee: Luis Fernández

3 April 2022	Corteva Cocos	40–16	Olímpico de Pozuelo	La Cartuja, Seville
13:00 CEST (UTC+2)	Try: Beatriz Baraia-Etxaburu 20' c Marta Carmona 35' m Lea Ducher (2) 37' c, 62' m Tahlia Dawn Brody 58' m María De Las Huertas Román 68' m Con: Lea Ducher (2) 21', 38'; Pen: Lea Ducher (2) 40', 44'	Report	Try: Beatriz Sanjurjo 80' c Con: Ana Marina Sánchez 80'; Pen: Ana Marina Sánchez (3) 5', 12', 30'	Referee: Félix Villegas

=== Final ===
10 April 2022	Corteva Cocos	36–29	Majadahonda	El Cuartillo, Cáceres
14:00 CEST (UTC+2)	Try: Ana Mamea 16' c Sasha Hallet-Mahuika (2) 20' m, 79' m Cristina Cabas 41' m Lea Ducher 73' m Con: Lea Ducher 16'; Pen: Lea Ducher (3) 50', 57', 65'	Report	Try: Claudia Pérez 9' c Eva Aguirre (2) 26' m, 45' c Lucía Díaz 34' c Con: Cristina López (3) 9', 34', 45'; Pen: Cristina López 68'; Cards: Cristina Cueto (yellow card) 13' to 23'	Referee: Pedro Montoya

== Leading scorers ==
=== Most points ===
Rank	Player	Club	Points
1	(France) Lea Ducher	Corteva Cocos	135
2	(Spain) Cristina López	Majadahonda	113
3	(Spain) Marta Carmona	Corteva Cocos	72
3	(Spain) Ana Marina Sánchez	Olímpico de Pozuelo	72
5	(United States) Tahlia Dawn Brody	Corteva Cocos	65
6	(Spain) Isabel Martí	CRAT Residencia RIALTA	60
6	(Spain) Claudia Pérez	Majadahonda	60
8	(Spain) Inés Bueso-Inchausti	Complutense Cisneros	59
9	(Spain) Ana Iglesias	CRAT Residencia RIALTA	56
10	(Spain) Alba Mireya Vives	Majadahonda	55

=== Most tries ===
Rank	Player	Club	Tries
1	(United States) Tahlia Dawn Brody	Corteva Cocos	13
2	(Spain) Marta Carmona	Corteva Cocos	12
2	(Spain) Isabel Martí	CRAT Residencia RIALTA	12
2	(Spain) Claudia Pérez	Majadahonda	12
5	(Spain) Alba Mireya Vives	Majadahonda	11
6	(France) Lea Ducher	Corteva Cocos	9
6	(Spain) Maria Kimberly Marcos	Majadahonda	9
8	(Spain) Eva Aguirre	Majadahonda	8
8	(France) Maika Brust	Eibar Rugby Taldea	8
8	(New Zealand) Sasha Hallet-Mahuika	Corteva Cocos	8
8	(Spain) Amaiur Mayo	Eibar Rugby Taldea	8
