= 2010–11 División de Honor Femenina de Rugby =

2010–11 División de Honor Femenina
- Countries: Spain
- Number of teams: 7
- Date: 24 October 2010 – 10 April 2011
- Champions: INEF Barcelona (8th title)
- Runners-up: CRAT Univesidade da Coruña
- Relegated: Gaztedi RT
- Matches played: 21
- Tries scored: 151 (average 7.2 per match)

The 2010–11 División de Honor Femenina de Rugby was the 1st season of the División de Honor, the top flight of Spanish domestic women's rugby union competition. The new competition replaced the previously existing Queen's Cup and saw the 7 teams of that competition last instalment face off in a single round robin for the new title.

INEF Barcelona won all their matches with try bonus, and thus the championship, which was their 8th national title.

== Teams ==
2010–11 División de Honor Teams

Team	Head coach	Stadium	City
(Galicia (Spain)) CRAT Universidade da Coruña	Rogelio Sabio	Elviña	A Coruña
(Catalonia) G.E.i.E.G.	Coral Vila	Complex Esportiu Palau Sacosta	Girona
(Basque Country (autonomous community)) Gaztedi	Roberto Bartolomé	Campo de Rugby del Parque de Gamarra	Vitoria-Gasteiz
(Basque Country (autonomous community)) Getxo Artea		Polideportivo Fadura	Getxo
(Catalonia) INEF Barcelona	Víctor Marlet	Feixa Llarga	L'Hospitalet de Llobregat
(Community of Madrid) Majadahonda	Beatriz Muriel	Valle del Arcipreste	Majadahonda
(Community of Madrid) Olímpico de Pozuelo	Rocío Ramírez	Valle de las Cañas	Pozuelo de Alarcón

== Table ==
Pos	Team	P	W	D	L	PF	PA	PD	BP	Pts
1	INEF Barcelona	6	6	0	0	256	22	234	6	30
2	CRAT Universidade da Coruña	6	5	0	1	180	95	85	4	24
3	Majadahonda	6	4	0	2	160	74	86	4	20
4	G.E.i.E.G.	6	2	0	4	137	104	33	3	11
5	Getxo Artea	6	2	0	4	62	184	-122	1	9
6	Olímpico de Pozuelo	6	1	0	5	75	190	-115	2	6
7	Gaztedi	6	1	0	5	46	247	-201	0	4
Last placed plays a relegation playoff against the runner-up of the regional promotion tournament.

== Fixtures ==
=== Round 1 ===
24 October 2010	(1BP) INEF Barcelona	51–5	Gaztedi	Feixa Llarga, L'Hospitalet de Llobregat
	Try: 9 Con: 3		Try: 1

24 October 2010	(1BP) Majadahonda	34–0	Olímpico de Pozuelo	Valle del Arcipreste, Majadahonda
	Try: Isis Velasco Morán (3); Marina Bravo Bragado; Rosa María López Aparicio; Micaela Martínez Benavente; Con: Isis Velasco Morán (2)

24 October 2010	Getxo Artea	12–44	CRAT Universidade da Coruña (1BP)	Polideportivo Fadura, Getxo
	Try: Isabel Rodríguez Bergareche; Sara de la Llama Van den Eynde; Con: Eva Rincón Ortiz		Try: Ana Vanessa Rial López (2); Berta García Alonso; Rocío García Eiras; Silvia Vázquez Vallo; Margot Garnelo Merayo; María Aranzazú Rey Suárez; Con: Helena Rodríguez Broullón (3); Pen: Helena Rodríguez Broullón

=== Round 2 ===
20 November 2010	Olímpico de Pozuelo	7–64	INEF Barcelona (1BP)	Valle de las Cañas, Pozuelo de Alarcón
	Try: María Sobrinos Martín; Con: Irene Schiavón Matteo		Try: Marta Pocurull Bosch (3); Laura Esbrí Antón (2); Lorena Ferrer Samperiz +4 more Con: Clara Costa Fàbregas

21 November 2010	(1BP) CRAT Universidade da Coruña	20–15	Majadahonda (1BP)	Elviña, A Coruña
	Try: Ana Vanessa Rial López (2); Rocío García Eiras (2)		Try: Isis Velasco Morán; Laura Gómez Almaraz; Con: Isis Velasco Morán; Pen: Marina Bravo Bragado

21 November 2010	(1BP) G.E.i.E.G.	39–5	Getxo Artea	Complex Esportiu Palau Sacosta, Girona
	Try: 7 Con: 2		Try: Eva Rincón Ortiz

=== Round 3 ===
19 December 2010	Gaztedi	19–15	Olímpico de Pozuelo (1BP)	Campo de Rugby del Parque de Gamarra, Vitoria-Gasteiz
	Try: Nerea Otxoa de Aspuru Atauri +2 more Con: Edurne Fernández de Arroyabe (2)		Try: Irene Schiavón Matteo; Ana Maria Cabello Dimas; Con: Irene Schiavón Matteo; Pen: Irene Schiavón Matteo

19 December 2010	(1BP) INEF Barcelona	24–0	CRAT Universidade da Coruña	Feixa Llarga, L'Hospitalet de Llobregat
	Try: Marta Pocurrull (2); Aroa González; María Rivera; Con: Meritxell Urbiola (2)

19 December 2010	(1BP) Majadahonda	35–20	G.E.i.E.G.	Valle del Arcipreste, Majadahonda
	Try: Laura Pérez Martín; Marta Sánchez Cavadas; Marta Lliteras Ruiz; Raquél Ruiz De Gauna Bonail; Con: Marina Bravo Bragado (3); Pen: Marina Bravo Bragado (3)		Try: Elisabet Martínez García (2); Laura Lladó Martí; Con: Laura Lladó Martí; Pen: Laura Lladó Martí

=== Round 4 ===
16 January 2011	(1BP) CRAT Universidade da Coruña	50–12	Gaztedi	Elviña, A Coruña
	Try: Berta García Alonso (4); Ana Vanessa Rial López (2); Rocío García Eiras; Paula Medín López; Con: Helena Rodríguez Broullón (5)		Try: Aitziber Porras Conde; Zuriñe Eciolaza Lomas; Con: Edurne Fernández de Arroyabe

16 January 2011	G.E.i.E.G.	3–29	INEF Barcelona (1BP)	Complex Esportiu Palau Sacosta, Girona
	Pen: Laura Llado Martí		Try: Laura Esbrí Antón (2); Aroa González; Raquel Erro Font; Clara Costa Fàbregas; Con: Aroa González +1 more

16 January 2011	Getxo Artea	5–20	Majadahonda	Polideportivo Fadura, Getxo
	Try: Bàrbara Pla Vegue		Try: Marina Bravo Bragado; Isis Velasco Morán; Laura Pérez Martín; Con: Marina Bravo Bragado; Pen: Marina Bravo Bragado

=== Round 5 ===
20 February 2011	Olímpico de Pozuelo	24–48	CRAT Universidade da Coruña (1BP)	Valle de las Cañas, Pozuelo de Alarcón
	Try: Irene Schiavón Matteo 61' c Isabel Torralbo Talavera 68' c Raquel Fraguas Castellot 73' c Con: Irene Schiavón Matteo (3) 61', 68', 73'; Pen: Irene Schiavón Matteo 3'		Try: Mónica Castelo Mejuto 6' m Berta García Alonso (3) 11' c, 18' c, 41' c Lucía Sánchez Díaz 38' c Rocío García Eiras 48' m Paula De Lama Gonzalez (2) 52' m, 74' m Con: Helena Rodríguez Broullón (4) 11', 18', 38', 41'

20 February 2011	Gaztedi	0–55	G.E.i.E.G. (1BP)	Campo de Rugby del Parque de Gamarra, Vitoria-Gasteiz
			Try: Elisabeth Martínez García (5); Laia Gibert Martín (2); Alicia Derksena (2); Con: Alicia Derksena (3); Marina Cabre Castells (2)

20 February 2011	(1BP) INEF Barcelona	59–0	Getxo Artea	Feixa Llarga, L'Hospitalet de Llobregat
	Try: Marta Pocurull Bosch (3); Pedrona Serra Payeras (2); Ángela Del Pan Moruno; Clara Costa Fàbregas; Lorena Ferrer Samperiz; Maria Del Carmen Lillo Castillo; María Concepción Ramos Tallada +1 more Con: Clara Costa Fàbregas; Meritxell Urbiola Coma

=== Round 6 ===
12 March 2011	(1BP) G.E.i.E.G.	12–17	Olímpico de Pozuelo	Complex Esportiu Palau Sacosta, Girona
	Try: Laia Gibert Martín; Nuria Canals Sangra; Con: Laura Llado Martí		Try: Irene Schiavón Matteo (2); María Sobrinos Martín; Con: Irene Schiavón Matteo

12 March 2011	(1BP) Getxo Artea	27–10	Gaztedi	Polideportivo Fadura, Getxo
	Try: Bàrbara Pla Vegue; Rosanna Estanyol Marin; Isabel Rodriguez Bergareche; Nerea Agirre Moragues; Leire Elorriaga Zorrozua; Con: Bàrbara Pla Vegue		Try: Estíbaliz Apiñaniz Fernández de Larrinoa; Maider Bengoa Moyua

12 March 2011	Majadahonda	7–29	INEF Barcelona (1BP)	Valle del Arcipreste, Majadahonda
	Try: Marina Bravo Bragado; Con: Marina Bravo Bragado		Try: Ángela del Pan Moruno (3); Aroa González de la Concepción; Laura Esbrí Antón; Con: Meritxell Urbiola Coma (2)

=== Round 7 ===
10 April 2011	CRAT Universidade da Coruña	18–8	G.E.i.E.G.	Elviña, A Coruña
	Try: Paula Medín López (3); Pen: Berta García Alonso		Try: Marta Cabane Pascual; Pen: Laura Llado Martí

10 April 2011	(1BP) Olímpico de Pozuelo	12–13	Getxo Artea	Valle de las Cañas, Pozuelo de Alarcón
	Try: Irene Schiavon Matteo (2); Con: Irene Schiavon Matteo		Try: Isabel Rodriguez Bergareche (2); Pen: Bàrbara Pla Vegue

10 April 2011	Gaztedi	0–49	Majadahonda (1BP)	Campo de Rugby del Parque de Gamarra, Vitoria-Gasteiz
			Try: Marina Bravo Bragado (4); Yolanda Sempere Padilla (2); Laura Pérez Martín; Micaela Martínez Benavente; Rut Pérez Polo; Con: Marina Bravo Bragado (2)

=== Relegation ===
5 June 2011	Gaztedi	0–65	Sanse Scrum	Estadio Pepe Rojo, Valladolid
			Try: Bibi (3); Ali (2); Bego (2); Pilar (2); Paulita; Yanara; Con: Bego (5)
