= 2022–23 Liga Iberdrola de Rugby =

- Countries: Spain
- Number of teams: 8
- Date: 1 October 2022 – 23 April 2023
- Champions: Majadahonda (3rd title)
- Runners-up: Corteva Cocos
- Relegated: Complutense Cisneros
- Matches played: 59
- Tries scored: 415 (average 7 per match)
- Top point scorer: (Chile) Carolina Fernanda Alfaro (Corteva Cocos) – 125 points
- Top try scorer: (New Zealand) Hosanna Arietta Aumua (Eibar Rugby Taldea) – 14 tries

Official website
- ferugby.es/calendario-liga-iberdrola

The 2022–23 Liga Iberdrola de Rugby was the 13th season of the Liga Iberdrola de Rugby, the top flight of Spanish domestic women's rugby union competition and the 7th to be sponsored by Iberdrola. The reigning champions entering the season are Corteva Cocos who claimed their 2nd league title after winning the 2021-22 final against Majadahonda.

== Teams ==
2022–23 Liga Iberdrola de Rugby Teams

Eight teams compete in the league – the top seven teams from the previous season and Crealia El Salvador who were promoted as champions of the 2021–22 Honor Division B. They replaced Sanse Scrum who were relegated after nine years in the top flight.

Team	Captain	Head coach	Stadium	Capacity	City
(Galicia (Spain)) CRAT Residencia RIALTA	Cecilia Huarte	José Antonio Portos	Elviña	1500	A Coruña
(Community of Madrid) Majadahonda	Lucía Díaz	Jesús Delgado	Valle del Arcipreste	200	Majadahonda
(Community of Madrid) Complutense Cisneros	Paula Gil	José Ignacio Hidalgo	Campo Central CIU	12400	Madrid
(Community of Madrid) Olímpico de Pozuelo	Miriam Vega	Daniel Mingo	Valle de las Cañas	300	Pozuelo de Alarcón
(Andalusia) Corteva Cocos	Julia Castro	Jesús Romero	La Cartuja	1932	Sevilla
(Castile and León) Crealia El Salvador	Elisa Castro	Harry Semple (Note: Fired after round 5); Michael Walker-Fitton	Estadio Pepe Rojo	2500	Valladolid
(Catalonia) Sant Cugat	Alysha Stone	Albert Cassorran	ZEM La Guinardera	500	Sant Cugat del Vallès
(Basque Country (autonomous community)) Eibar Rugby Taldea	Amaiur Mayo	María Cristina Guntín	Unbe	600	Éibar

== Table ==
Pos	Club	P	W	D	L	PF	PA	PD	TF	TA	TD	OBP	DBP	Pts
1	Corteva Cocos	14	11	0	3	423	208	+215	62	34	+28	6	2	52
2	Majadahonda	14	10	0	4	411	262	+149	67	39	+28	9	2	51
3	Crealia El Salvador	14	9	0	5	287	294	-7	42	47	-5	1	1	38
4	Eibar Rugby Taldea	14	7	0	7	305	336	-31	52	53	-1	3	2	33 (Note: Round 10 match between Sant Cugat and Eibar ended originally as a 12–27 bonus win for Eibar, but was later changed to a 21-0 bonus win for Sant Cugat because Eibar fielded too many foreign players. Eibar also received an extra 2 points deduction. A month later the Administrative Court of Sport suspended the sanction in a preventative measure.)
5	CRAT Residencia RIALTA	14	6	1	7	298	319	-21	47	51	-4	2	3	31
6	Sant Cugat	14	7	1	6	267	359	-92	41	58	-17	0	0	30
7	Olímpico de Pozuelo	14	4	0	10	214	344	-130	33	54	-21	0	4	20
8	Complutense Cisneros	14	1	0	13	283	366	-83	44	52	-8	1	9	14
First Four are play-off places. Second to last plays a relegation playoff against Honor Division B runner-up. Last placed relegated to Honor Division B.

== Regular season ==
Fixtures for the season were announced by the Spanish Rugby Federation on 26 July 2022. The league kicked off on October 1

=== Round 1 ===
1 October 2022	(OBP) Majadahonda	36–17	Eibar Rugby Taldea	Valle del Arcipreste, Majadahonda
16:00 CEST (UTC+2)	Try: Cristina Cueto (2) 14' c, 76' m Maria Kimberly Marcos 17' m Yelyzaveta Havrylova 45' m Vico Gorrochategui 51' c Marta Fresno 65' c Con: Marta Pro (3) 15', 52', 76'; Cards: Marta Fresno (yellow card) 69' to 79'	Report	Try: Patricia Zandile Khumalo 30' c Doha Benslaiman 39' m Rianna Mere Aspinall 71' m Con: Cheyne Ranei Ariana Copeland 31'	Referee: José Luis Murillo

1 October 2022	(OBP) CRAT Residencia RIALTA	47–15	Sant Cugat	Elviña, A Coruña
16:00 CEST (UTC+2)	Try: Alicia San Martín 3' c Quen Makkinga 12' c Sina Te Aroha Tainefu (2) 22' c, 35' c penalty try 51'; Judith Hernández 67' c Cecilia Huarte 69' m Con: Alejandra Fernández (5) 4', 13', 23', 36', 68'; Cards: Cecilia Huarte (yellow card) 38' to 48'	Report	Try: Carla Arca 7' m Maria Soriano 17' m Alysha Stone 45' m	Referee: Félix Villegas

2 October 2022	(DBP) Complutense Cisneros	26–32	Crealia El Salvador	Campo Central CIU, Madrid
12:30 CEST (UTC+2)	Try: Alba María Alonso (2) 24' c, 80' c Ester Peirotén 32' c Paula Xutglà 69' m Con: Elisa Álvarez (2) 25', 33'; Paula Gil 80'; Cards: Sofía Ayuso (yellow card) 78' to 80'	Report	Try: María Miguel (2) 2' c, 73' m Ashlea Grace Bishop 10' m Tecla Masoko 27' c Carmen Fernández 43' m Con: Alba Alpín (2) 3', 28'; Pen: Alba Alpín 59'; Cards: Ocean Tierney (yellow card) 24' to 34'	Referee: Lorena Martínez

2 October 2022	Corteva Cocos	29–12	Olímpico de Pozuelo	La Cartuja, Seville
12:00 CEST (UTC+2)	Try: Lavinia Silia Taukalaliku (2) 16' c, 44' c Mele Hingano Tavake 41' c Merenia Marie Paraone 55' m Con: Carolina Fernanda Alfaro (3) 16', 42', 45'; Pen: Carolina Fernanda Alfaro 24'	Report	Try: Amaya Rascón 39' m María Del Castillo 61' c Con: Ana Marina Sánchez 62'	Referee: Víctor Cuenca

=== Round 2 ===
9 October 2022	Eibar Rugby Taldea	12–45	Corteva Cocos (OBP)	Unbe
13:00 CEST (UTC+2)	Try: Eider García 35' m Agueda Pis 63' c Con: Cheyne Ranei Ariana Copeland 64'	Report	Try: Marta Carmona (2) 16' c, 28' c Merenia Marie Paraone 24' c Julia Castro 39' c Lucía Gayoso 46' m Ana Peralta 67' m María De Las Huertas Román 73' c Con: Carolina Fernanda Alfaro (5) 17', 25', 29', 40', 74'; Cards: Nicole Francesca Cerulli (yellow card) 70' to 80'	Referee: Roger Parera

8 October 2022	Sant Cugat	17–38	Majadahonda (OBP)	Cornellá
16:00 CEST (UTC+2)	Try: Paula Pou 22' c Carla Arca 42' c Con: Ana María Iglesias (2) 23', 43'; Pen: Axelle Ramón 49'; Cards: Abril Camacho (red card) 29'	Report	Try: María Kimberly Marcos (2) 5' m, 65' c Alba Mireya Vives 29' m Claudia Pérez 46' c Vico Gorrochategui 59' c Rocío Rodera 69' c Con: Marta Pro (3) 60', 66', 70'; Jade Cardouat 47'; Cards: Marta Pro (yellow card) 38' to 48'	Referee: Lorena Martínez

8 October 2022	Crealia El Salvador	15–10	CRAT Residencia RIALTA (DBP)	Estadio Pepe Rojo, Valladolid
17:30 CEST (UTC+2)	Try: María Miguel 32' c Ocean Tierney 48' m Con: Alba Alpín 32'; Pen: Alba Alpín 2'	Report	Try: Isabel Martí 42' m Sina Te Aroha Tainefu 69' m	Referee: Gonzalo Pardo

9 October 2022	Olímpico de Pozuelo	21–18	Complutense Cisneros (DBP)	Valle de las Cañas, Pozuelo de Alarcón
12:30 CEST (UTC+2)	Try: Paula Coca 29' c Sidorella Bracic 53' c Miriam Vega 60' c Con: Ana Marina Sánchez (3) 30', 54', 61'; Cards: Sidorella Bracic (yellow card) 65' to 75'	Report	Try: Paula Gil (2) 23' m, 75' m Rosa Blasco 35' m Pen: Elisa Álvarez 32'; Cards: Sofia Ayuso (yellow card) 51' to 61'	Referee: Pedro José Pérez

=== Round 3 ===
23 October 2022	(DBP) Eibar Rugby Taldea	22–29	Sant Cugat	Unbe
13:00 CEST (UTC+2)	Try: Patricia Zandile Khumalo 22' m Amaiur Mayo 29' c Rianna Mere Aspinall 55' m Cheyne Ranei Ariana Copeland 80' m Con: Marit Lemmens 30'; Cards: Oraçao Sambu (yellow card) 38' to 48'; Amaiur Mayo (yellow card) 66' to 76'	Report	Try: Bea González (2) 7' m, 69' c Ana María Iglesias (2) 34' m, 43' c Abril Camacho 50' m Con: Ana María Iglesias (2) 44', 70'	Referee: Luis Fernández

23 October 2022	(DBP) Majadahonda	26–27	Crealia El Salvador	Valle del Arcipreste, Majadahonda
12:30 CEST (UTC+2)	Try: Maria Kimberly Marcos 18' m Marta Cantabrana 60' c Eva Aguirre 69' c Marta Estellés 79' c Con: Jade Cardouat (3) 61', 70', 79'	Report	Try: Irene Alonso 42' m Ocean Tierney 44' c Belsay Escudero 47' m Tecla Masoko 63' c Con: Alba Alpín (2) 45', 64'; Pen: Alba Alpín 15'; Cards: Emma Lee Taruke Clearly (yellow card) 79' to 80'	Referee: Eki Fanlo

23 October 2022	CRAT Residencia RIALTA	24–17	Olímpico de Pozuelo (DBP)	Elviña, A Coruña
12:00 CEST (UTC+2)	Try: Quen Makkinga (2) 8' c, 78' m Alba Lisandra Martínez 58' c Isabel Martí 65' m Con: Alejandra Fernández (2) 8', 58'	Report	Try: Ana Marina Sánchez 25' m Silvia Morales 55' c Paula Coca 73' m Con: Ana Marina Sánchez 55'	Referee: David Joaquín Castro

22 October 2022	Corteva Cocos	41–24	Complutense Cisneros	La Cartuja, Seville
16:00 CEST (UTC+2)	Try: Marta Carmona 22' c Ana Peralta 36' m María De Las Huertas Román 40' m Ana Serrano 45' c Lavinia Silia Taukalaliku 78' m Con: Carolina Fernanda Alfaro (2) 23', 46'; Pen: Carolina Fernanda Alfaro (3) 8', 20', 25', 70'	Report	Try: Pilar Rico 50' m Arantzazu Olabarria (2) 57' c, 61' m Paula Xutglà 80' c Con: Elisa Álvarez 58'; Inés Bueso-Inchausti 80'	Referee: José Luis Murillo

=== Round 4 ===
30 October 2022	Sant Cugat	20–13	Corteva Cocos (DBP)	ZEM La Guinardera, Sant Cugat del Vallès
12:30 CET (UTC+1)	Try: Alysha Stone 14' m Carla Arca 28' c Mireia García 40' m Con: Ana María Iglesias 28'; Pen: Ana María Iglesias 72'; Cards: Alysha Stone (yellow card) 63' to 73'	Report	Try: Laura Muñiz 38' c Con: Carolina Fernanda Alfaro 38'; Pen: Carolina Fernanda Alfaro (2) 47', 58'; Cards: Mele Hingano Tavake (yellow card) 52' to 62'	Referee: Joaquín Santoro

29 October 2022	Crealia El Salvador	24–12	Eibar Rugby Taldea	Estadio Pepe Rojo, Valladolid
17:00 CEST (UTC+2)	Try: Raquel García (2) 28' m, 39' m Emma Lee Taruke Cleary 43' c Ocean Tierney 75' c Con: Alba Alpín (2) 43', 75'; Cards: Noelia Pessoa (yellow card) 9' to 19'; Inés Antolínez (yellow card) 50' to 60' (yellow card) 64' (yellow-red card)	Report	Try: Hosanna Arietta Aumua 65' c Amaiur Mayo 70' m Con: Rianna Mere Aspinall 65'; Cards: Eider García (yellow card) 29' to 39'; Cheyne Ranei Ariana Copeland (yellow card) 36' to 46'	Referee: David Joaquín Castro

29 October 2022	Olímpico de Pozuelo	17–33	Majadahonda (OBP)	Valle de las Cañas, Pozuelo de Alarcón
13:45 CEST (UTC+2)	Try: Amanda Prado 29' c Paula Coca 65' c Con: Ana Marina Sánchez (2) 30', 66'; Pen: Ana Marina Sánchez 51'	Report	Try: Eva Aguirre 33' c penalty try 57'; Marta Cantabrana 61' c Alba Noa Castellano 75' m Lorena Frutos 78' c Con: Jade Cardouat 34'; Marta Pro (2) 62', 79'; Cards: Vico Gorrochategui (yellow card) 26' to 36'; Alba Mireya Vives (yellow card) 37' to 47'	Referee: Alfonso Mirat

30 October 2022	(OBP) Complutense Cisneros	29–7	CRAT Residencia RIALTA	Campo Central CIU, Madrid
12:00 CET (UTC+1)	Try: Inés Bueso-Inchausti 12' m María Calvo (2) 30' m, 76' m Arantzazu Olabarria 45' c Rosa Blasco 79' c Con: Inés Bueso-Inchausti (2) 45', 79'	Report	Try: Cecilia Huarte 20' c Con: Alejandra Fernández 20'	Referee: Andoni Susperregui

=== Round 5 ===
6 November 2022	Sant Cugat	23–17	Crealia El Salvador (DBP)	ZEM La Guinardera, Sant Cugat del Vallès
11:30 CET (UTC+1)	Try: Ana Harris 12' m Maitane Ibañez 37' m Esther Moraleda 55' c Con: Ana María Iglesias 56'; Pen: Ana María Iglesias (2) 27', 70'	Report	Try: Belsay Escudero 16' c Beatriz Rivera 32' m María Miguel 48' m Con: Ashlea Grace Bishop 17'; Cards: Irene Alonso (yellow card) 26' to 36'; Alba Alpín (yellow card) 64' to 74'	Referee: Lorena Martínez

5 November 2022	(DBP) Eibar Rugby Taldea	22–24	Olímpico de Pozuelo	Unbe
16:00 CET (UTC+1)	Try: Aleuzenev Alejandra Cid 13' m Raquel Riera 47' m Eider García 61' c Hosanna Arietta Aumua 69' m Con: Rianna Mere Aspinall 62'; Cards: Jone Carral (yellow card) 21' to 31'; Patricia Zandile Khumalo (yellow card) 44' to 54'	Report	Try: Ana Marina Sánchez 33' m Cristina García 39' c penalty try 44'; Lia Piñeiro 78' m Con: Ana Marina Sánchez 40'; Cards: Laura Arnaiz (yellow card) 56' to 66'	Referee: Félix Villegas

5 November 2022	(OBP) Majadahonda	31–15	Complutense Cisneros	Valle del Arcipreste, Majadahonda
16:00 CET (UTC+1)	Try: Claudia Pérez (3) 3' c, 25' c, 38' m Luisina Contreras 34' c Yelyzaveta Havrylova 41' m Con: Jade Cardouat (3) 3', 25', 34'; Cards: Diana Guerrero (yellow card) 20' to 30'; Jade Cardouat (yellow card) 61' to 71'; Alba Mireya Vives (yellow card) 71' to 80'	Report	Try: Arantzazu Olabarria 49' c Katya Piñero 56' m Con: Elisa Álvarez 49'; Pen: Elisa Álvarez 10'; Cards: Elsa Del Pino (yellow card) 41' to 51'; Raquel Alonso (yellow card) 52' to 62'	Referee: Andoni Susperregui

6 November 2022	(OBP) Corteva Cocos	36–12	CRAT Residencia RIALTA	La Cartuja, Seville
11:00 CET (UTC+1)	Try: Irene Romero (2) 6' m, 26' m Lavinia Silia Taukalaliku (3) 19' m, 47' c, 66' c Lucia Gayoso 38' c Con: Carolina Fernanda Alfaro (3) 39', 48', 67'; Cards: María De Las Huertas Román (yellow card) 70' to 80'	Report	Try: Alicia San Martín 55' c Alba Lisandra Martínez 60' m Con: Alejandra Fernández 56'	Referee: Roger Parera

=== Round 6 ===
27 November 2022	(OBP) Corteva Cocos	36–7	Crealia El Salvador	La Cartuja, Seville
11:30 CET (UTC+1)	Try: Lavinia Silia Taukalaliku (2) 4' m, 23' m Lucía Gayoso 42' c Kassandra Sylla 62' m Irene Romero 67' c Blanca Ruiz 76' c Con: Carolina Fernanda Alfaro (2) 43', 68'; Irene Romero 77'; Cards: Merenia Marie Paraone (yellow card) 80' to 80'	Report	Try: Emma Lee Taruke Cleary 80' c Con: Alba Alpín 80'; Cards: Emma Lee Taruke Cleary (yellow card) 18' to 28'; Ashlea Grace Bishop (yellow card) 57' to 67'	Referee: Luis Fernández

26 November 2022	(DBP) Olímpico de Pozuelo	12–18	Sant Cugat	Valle de las Cañas, Pozuelo de Alarcón
16:00 CET (UTC+1)	Try: Amanda Prado 32' c Paula Coca 74' m Con: Ana Marina Sánchez 33'	Report	Try: Ana Maria Iglesias 28' m Maitane Ibáñez 67' m Alysha Stone 74' m Drop: Ana Maria Iglesias 50'	Referee: Lorena Martínez

27 November 2022	Eibar Rugby Taldea	29–24	Complutense Cisneros (DBP)	Unbe
16:00 CET (UTC+1)	Try: Rianna Mere Aspinall 9' c Paula Agustina Ghiorzi 15' m Amaiur Mayo 44' c Hosanna Arietta Aumua 80' c Con: Cheyne Ranei Ariana Copeland (3) 10', 45', 80'; Pen: Cheyne Ranei Ariana Copeland 54'; Cards: Natale Murray (yellow card) 28' to 38'	Report	Try: Alba María Alonso (2) 39' c, 77' c Rosa Blasco 58' c Con: Elisa Álvarez (3) 40', 59', 78'; Pen: Elisa Álvarez 36'	Referee: Roger Parera

27 November 2022	CRAT Residencia RIALTA	15–30	Majadahonda (OBP)	Elviña, A Coruña
11:30 CET (UTC+1)	Try: Elsa Porto (2) 54' m, 62' c Con: Alejandra Fernández 63'; Pen: Ana Iglesias 11'	Report	Try: Cristina Cueto 30' c María Kimberly Marcos 37' m Alba Noa Castellano 43' m Claudia Pérez 47' m Luisina Contreras 70' m Con: Alba Noa Castellano 31'; Pen: Alba Noa Castellano 14'; Cards: Diana Guerrero (yellow card) 20' to 30'	Referee: José Luis Murillo

=== Round 7 ===
11 December 2022	Crealia El Salvador	20–8	Olímpico de Pozuelo	Estadio Pepe Rojo, Valladolid
13:00 CET (UTC+1)	Try: Emma Lee Taruke Cleary 38' m Pen: Alba Alpín (5) 12', 15', 30', 44', 70'	Report	Try: Miriam Vega 25' m Pen: Ana Marina Sánchez 18'; Cards: Amanda Prado (yellow card) 37' to 47'	Referee: Andoni Susperregui

10 December 2022	Sant Cugat	27–15	Complutense Cisneros	ZEM La Guinardera, Sant Cugat del Vallès
15:30 CET (UTC+1)	Try: Sara Marín 13' c Mireia García (2) 21' c, 60' m Alysha Stone 40' m Con: Ana María Iglesias (2) 14', 22'; Pen: Ana María Iglesias 19'; Cards: Mireia García (yellow card) 65' to 75'	Report	Try: Inés Bueso-Inchausti 27' m Alba María Alonso 31' c Con: Elisa Álvarez 32'; Pen: Zahía Perez 53'	Referee: Miguel Fernández

11 December 2022	Eibar Rugby Taldea	24–19	CRAT Residencia RIALTA (DBP)	Unbe
12:00 CET (UTC+1)	Try: Paula Agustina Ghiorzi 5' m Amaiur Mayo 52' c Hosanna Arietta Aumua 66' c Patricia Zandile Khumalo 74' m Con: Cheyne Ranei Ariana Copeland (2) 53', 67'; Cards: Oraçao Sambu (yellow card) 39' to 49'	Report	Try: Isabel Martí 15' m Quen Makkinga 39' c Nicky Hannie Dix 42' c Con: Alejandra Fernández (2) 40', 43'	Referee: Luis Fernández

11 December 2022	Majadahonda	19–35	Corteva Cocos	Valle del Arcipreste, Majadahonda
14:00 CET (UTC+1)	Try: Rocío Rodera 4' m Vico Gorrochategui 30' c Daniela Diaz 47' c Con: Jade Cardouat (2) 31', 48'; Cards: Rocío Rodera (yellow card) 76' to 80'; Yelyzaveta Havrylova (yellow card) 79' to 80'	Report	Try: Lavinia Silia Taukalaliku 6' m Julia Castro 16' m Lea Ducher 52' m Merenia Marie Paraone 63' c Ana Peralta 72' c Con: Carolina Fernanda Alfaro (2) 64', 73'; Pen: Carolina Fernanda Alfaro (2) 42', 50'	Referee: Félix Villegas

=== Round 8 ===
17 December 2022	Eibar Rugby Taldea	15–10	Majadahonda (DBP)	Unbe
16:00 CET (UTC+1)	Try: Rianna Mere Aspinall 34' m Hosanna Arietta Aumua (2) 54' m, 64' m Cards: Aleuzenev Alejandra Cid (yellow card) 74' to 80'	Report	Try: Rocío Rodera 45' m Eva Aguirre 75' m Cards: Jade Cardouat (yellow card) 6' to 16'; Rocío Rodera (yellow card) 52' to 62'	Referee: David Joaquín Castro

17 December 2022	Sant Cugat	20–20	CRAT Residencia RIALTA	ZEM La Guinardera, Sant Cugat del Vallès
14:00 CET (UTC+1)	Try: Abril Camacho 4' m Alysha Stone (2) 8' m, 59' m Ana Harris 50' m	Report	Try: Judith Hernández (2) 24' c, 41' m Nicky Hannie Dix 76' m Con: Alejandra Fernández 25'; Pen: Ana Iglesias 56'	Referee: Iñaki Muñoz

17 December 2022	Crealia El Salvador	8–5	Complutense Cisneros (DBP)	Estadio Pepe Rojo, Valladolid
16:00 CET (UTC+1)	Try: María Miguel 80' m Pen: Alba Alpín 9'; Cards: Emma Lee Taruke Clearly (red card) 24'; Tecla Masoko (yellow card) 30' to 40'; Raquel García (yellow card) 53' to 63'	Report	Try: Elisa Álvarez 14' m Cards: Ana Vila (yellow card) 77' to 80'	Referee: Joaquín Santoro

18 December 2022	Olímpico de Pozuelo	7–45	Corteva Cocos (OBP)	Valle de las Cañas, Pozuelo de Alarcón
13:00 CET (UTC+1)	Try: Amanda Prado 77' c Con: Inés Spinola 78'	Report	Try: Lea Ducher (3) 13' c, 33' c, 42' c Marta Carmona (3) 29' c, 39' m, 57' m Cristina González 53' c Con: Carolina Fernanda Alfaro (5) 14', 30', 34', 43', 54'	Referee: Marc Riera

=== Round 9 ===
14 January 2023	(OBP) Corteva Cocos	50–12	Eibar Rugby Taldea	La Cartuja, Seville
16:00 CET (UTC+1)	Try: Marta Carmona 8' m Julia Castro 22' c Merenia Marie Paraone 27' m Ana Peralta (2) 34' c, 57' m Lavinia Silia Taukalaliku 36' m Cristina González 59' m Mele Hingano Tavake 73' m Con: Carolina Fernanda Alfaro (2) 22', 34'; Pen: Carolina Fernanda Alfaro (2) 50', 67'	Report	Try: Rianna Mere Aspinall 16' c Sabrina Poulin 44' m Con: Cheyne Ranei Ariana Copeland 16'; Cards: Sabrina Poulin (yellow card) 72' to 80'	Referee: Jenny Lee

14 January 2023	(OBP) Majadahonda	37–14	Sant Cugat	Valle del Arcipreste, Majadahonda
16:00 CET (UTC+1)	Try: Yelyzaveta Havrylova 3' m Alba Noa Castellano 8' m Claudia Pérez (2) 25' m, 39' c Vico Gorrochategui (2) 35' m, 66' m Marta Pro 58' m Con: Alba Noa Castellano 40'	Report	Try: Abril Camacho 43' c Elisabet Segarra 72' c Con: Ana María Iglesias 44'; Lucía Moya 73'; Cards: Sara Marin (yellow card) 6' to 16'; Meritxell Tur (yellow card) 16' to 26'	Referee: Eki Fanlo

14 January 2023	CRAT Residencia RIALTA	18–7	Crealia El Salvador	Elviña, A Coruña
16:00 CET (UTC+1)	Try: Isabel Martí 40' m Quen Makkinga 66' m Kyra Dewie Elzinga 71' m Pen: Ana Iglesias 61'	Report	Try: Amaia Fabo 34' c Con: Alba Alpín 35'; Cards: Jimena Parra (yellow card) 61' to 71'	Referee: Iñaki Muñoz

14 January 2023	(DBP) Complutense Cisneros	17–24	Olímpico de Pozuelo	Campo Central CIU, Madrid
15:30 CET (UTC+1)	Try: Isabel Cristina Romero 34' m Arantzazu Olabarria 39' c Zahía Pérez 59' m Con: Zahía Pérez 39'; Cards: Paula Gil (yellow card) 18' to 28'; Ana Vila (yellow card) 46' to 56'	Report	Try: Chiara Pisu 16' m Laura Arnaiz (3) 20' m, 46' c, 52' c Con: Ana Marina Sánchez (2) 47', 53'; Cards: Magali Harvey (yellow card) 27' to 37'; Hannah Olivia Persson (yellow card) 57' to 67'	Referee: Andoni Susperregui

=== Round 10 ===
21 January 2023	(OBP) Sant Cugat	21–0	Eibar Rugby Taldea	ZEM La Guinardera, Sant Cugat del Vallès
16:30 CET (UTC+1)	Try: Maitane Ibáñez 14' m Mireia García 56' c Con: Ana Maria Iglesias 56'	Report	Try: Eider García 10' m Sabrina Poulin 33' m Hosanna Arietta Aumua 40' m Aleuzenev Alejandra Cid 65' c Amaiur Mayo 75' m Con: Sabrina Poulin 66'	Referee: Lorena Martínez

21 January 2023	Crealia El Salvador	34–25	Majadahonda	Estadio Pepe Rojo, Valladolid
16:00 CET (UTC+1)	Try: Carmen Fernández 13' c Amaia Fabo (3) 39' m, 50' c, 73' m Belsay Escudero 43' c Con: Alba Alpín (3) 14', 44', 51'; Pen: Alba Alpín 10'; Cards: Jimena Parra (yellow card) 69' to 79'	Report	Try: Lucía Díaz 24' m Macarena del Valle (2) 37' m, 79' m Vico Gorrochategui 64' m Marta Pro 70' m Cards: Irene Garrido (yellow card) 42' to 52'	Referee: Íñigo Atorrasagasti

22 January 2023	Olímpico de Pozuelo	20–19	CRAT Residencia RIALTA (DBP)	Valle de las Cañas, Pozuelo de Alarcón
12:00 CET (UTC+1)	Try: Caroline Isabel Crossley (2) 34' c, 64' c Con: Ana Marina Sánchez (2) 35', 65'; Pen: Ana Marina Sánchez (2) 14', 52'	Report	Try: Cecilia Huarte 4' c Mariana Carolina Romero 17' m María Da Conceição Peixoto Rodrigues 79' c Con: Ana Iglesias (2) 5', 80'	Referee: Félix Villegas

22 January 2023	(DBP) Complutense Cisneros	15–18	Corteva Cocos	Campo Central CIU, Madrid
13:00 CET (UTC+1)	Try: Zahía Pérez 5' m Inés Bueso-Inchausti 36' m Ana Vila 80' m	Report	Try: Irene Romero 14' c María De Las Huertas Román 64' m Con: Carolina Fernanda Alfaro 15'; Pen: Carolina Fernanda Alfaro (2) 26', 78'	Referee: Marc Riera

=== Round 11 ===
4 March 2023	(OBP) Corteva Cocos	25–5	Sant Cugat	La Cartuja, Seville
15:00 CET (UTC+1)	Try: Lucia Gayoso 12' m María De Las Huertas Román (2) 21' m, 77' c Ana Peralta 29' m Con: Claudia Sánchez 78'; Pen: Carolina Fernanda Alfaro 6'; Cards: Justice Karena (yellow card) 48' to 58'	Report	Try: Alysha Stone 73' m	Referee: Alfonso Mirat

4 March 2023	(OBP) Eibar Rugby Taldea	40–12	Crealia El Salvador	Unbe, Eibar
17:30 CET (UTC+1)	Try: Hosanna Arietta Aumua (2) 1' c, 38' c Sabrina Poulin 27' c Amaiur Mayo 56' m Rianna Mere Aspinall 75' c Oraçao Sambu 78' c Con: Sabrina Poulin (5) 2', 28', 39', 76', 79'; Cards: Hosanna Arietta Aumua (yellow card) 59' to 69'	Report	Try: Maria Miguel 18' c Ocean Tierney 43' m Con: Alba Alpín 19'; Cards: Patricia Carreño (yellow card) 72' to 80'	Referee: Iñaki Muñoz

4 March 2023	(OBP) Majadahonda	27–15	Olímpico de Pozuelo	Valle del Arcipreste, Majadahonda
15:30 CET (UTC+1)	Try: Alba Mireya Vives 10' m Lucía Díaz (2) 23' m, 53' m Alba Noa Castellano 45' c Cristina Cueto 67' m Con: Alba Noa Castellano 46'; Cards: Alba Mireya Vives (yellow card) 62' to 72'; Luisina Contreras (yellow card) 72' to 80'	Report	Try: Ana Marina Sánchez 35' c Laura Arnaiz 50' m Con: Ana Marina Sánchez 36'; Pen: Ana Marina Sánchez 8'	Referee: Luis Fernández

4 March 2023	(OBP) CRAT Residencia RIALTA	45–24	Complutense Cisneros	Elviña, A Coruña
16:00 CET (UTC+1)	Try: Alicia San Martín 11' c Mariana Carolina Romero 38' c Anna Elizabeth Caplice 43' c Judith Hernández (2) 50' m, 75' c Quen Makkinga 73' m Cecilia Huarte 80' c Con: Ana Iglesias (5) 11', 38', 44', 75', 80'	Report	Try: Paula Xutglà (2) 20' c, 35' c Arantzazu Olabarria 68' c Con: Zahía Pérez (3) 20', 35', 68'; Pen: Elisa Álvarez 63'; Cards: Sofía Ayuso (yellow card) 56' to 66'	Referee: David Joaquín Castro

=== Round 12 ===
12 March 2023	(OBP) Crealia El Salvador	45–20	Sant Cugat	Estadio Pepe Rojo, Valladolid
11:30 CET (UTC+1)	Try: Tecla Masoko (3) 5' c, 41' c, 64' c Amaia Fabo 12' m Ocean Tierney (2) 37' c, 73' c Raquel García 47' m Con: Alba Alpín (5) 6', 37', 41', 64', 74'; Cards: Patricia Carreño (yellow card) 56' to 66' (yellow card) 79' (yellow-red card)	Report	Try: Carla Arca 28' m Carla Rodríguez 56' c Alysha Stone 79' m Con: Ana María Iglesias 56'; Pen: Lucía Moya 36'	Referee: Jenny Lee

12 March 2023	Olímpico de Pozuelo	7–34	Eibar Rugby Taldea (OBP)	Valle de las Cañas, Pozuelo de Alarcón
12:00 CET (UTC+1)	Try: Sidorella Bracic 62' c Con: Magali Harvey 62'; Cards: Sidorella Bracic (yellow card) 35' to 45'	Report	Try: Rianna Mere Aspinall 8' m Lide Erbina 19' m Hosanna Arietta Aumua (2) 25' c, 43' m Sabrina Poulin (2) 38' m, 50' c Con: Sabrina Poulin (2) 25', 50'; Cards: Adara Alfonso (yellow card) 73' to 80'	Referee: Lorena Martínez

11 March 2023	(DBP) Complutense Cisneros	22–28	Majadahonda	Campo Central CIU, Madrid
16:00 CET (UTC+1)	Try: María Calvo 46' m Pilar Rico (2) 51' m, 70' m Ana Vila 80' c Con: Zahía Pérez 80'	Report	Try: Vico Gorrochategui 28' c Marta Estellés 36' c Yelyzaveta Havrylova 40' m Con: Cristina López (2) 29', 37'; Pen: Cristina López (3) 22', 59', 74'; Cards: Marta Fresno (yellow card) 43' to 53'; Macarena Del Valle (yellow card) 66' to 76'	Referee: Tatiana Yunta

11 March 2023	CRAT Residencia RIALTA	22–20	Corteva Cocos (DBP)	Elviña, A Coruña
16:00 CET (UTC+1)	Try: María Vega 8' m Mariana Carolina Romero 35' c Nicky Hannie Dix 56' m Alba Lisandra Martínez 80' m Con: Ana Iglesias 35'	Report	Try: Mele Hingano Tavake 2' c Marta Carmona 29' m Lavinia Silia Taukalaliku 74' m Con: Carolina Fernanda Alfaro 2'; Pen: Carolina Fernanda Alfaro 25'; Cards: Lavinia Silia Taukalaliku (yellow card) 79' to 80'	Referee: Belarmino Álvarez

=== Round 13 ===
19 March 2023	Crealia El Salvador	15–25	Corteva Cocos	Estadio Pepe Rojo, Valladolid
10:45 CET (UTC+1)	Try: Ocean Tierney 10' m Inés Antolínez 67' c Con: Alba Alpín 68'; Pen: Alba Alpín 59'	Report	Try: Carolina Fernanda Alfaro (2) 3' m, 76' c María De Las Huertas Román 44' c Con: Carolina Fernanda Alfaro 45'; Blanca Ruíz 77'; Pen: Carolina Fernanda Alfaro (2) 49', 69'; Cards: Mele Hingano Tavake (yellow card) 19' to 29'; Merenia Marie Paraone (yellow card) 66' to 76'	Referee: Víctor Cuenca

18 March 2023	Sant Cugat	14–10	Olímpico de Pozuelo (DBP)	ZEM La Guinardera, Sant Cugat del Vallès
16:00 CET (UTC+1)	Try: Carla Arca 44' c Alysha Stone 56' c Con: Ana María Iglesias (2) 45', 56'; Cards: Lucía Moya (yellow card) 53' to 63'	Report	Try: Sara María Deygas 30' m Andrea García 59' m	Referee: Jorge Parera

18 March 2023	(DBP) Complutense Cisneros	18–22	Eibar Rugby Taldea	Campo Central CIU, Madrid
16:30 CET (UTC+1)	Try: Arantzazu Olabarria 5' c Pilar Rico 48' m Con: Elisa Álvarez 6'; Pen: Elisa Álvarez 28'; Zahía Pérez 68'	Report	Try: Hosanna Arietta Aumua (3) 13' m, 25' c, 80' m Sabrina Poulin 63' m Con: Sabrina Poulin 26'; Cards: Oraçao Sambu (yellow card) 4' to 14'	Referee: José Luis Murillo

19 March 2023	(OBP) Majadahonda	45–14	CRAT Residencia RIALTA	Valle del Arcipreste, Majadahonda
11:30 CET (UTC+1)	Try: Yelyzaveta Havrylova (2) 5' m, 16' m Claudia Pérez 24' m Luisina Contreras (2) 46' c, 50' c Silvia Hernández-Vaquero 55' m Cristina López 79' m Con: Cristina López (2) 46', 50'; Pen: Cristina López (2) 39', 73'	Report	Try: Mariana Carolina Romero (2) 1' c, 27' c Con: Ana Iglesias (2) 1', 27'; Cards: Alba Rubial (yellow card) 45' to 55'	Referee: Andoni Susperregui

=== Round 14 ===
15 April 2023	(DBP) Olímpico de Pozuelo	20–24	Crealia El Salvador	Valle de las Cañas, Pozuelo de Alarcón
17:00 CEST (UTC+2)	Try: Ana Marina Sánchez 34' m Luz Maria Martín (2) 50' m, 79' m Amanda Prado 60' m	Report	Try: Carla Méndez 11' c Saray Avilés 25' m Jimena Parra 38' m Beatriz Rivera 72' c Con: Alba Alpín (2) 12', 73'; Cards: Emma Lee Taruke Cleary (yellow card) 76' to 80'	Referee: Miguel Fernández

15 April 2023	(DBP) Complutense Cisneros	31–33	Sant Cugat	Campo Central CIU, Madrid
16:00 CEST (UTC+2)	Try: Aiora Hijarrubia 2' c Inés Bueso-Inchausti 9' c Sofía Ayuso 16' m Pilar Rico 34' c Ana Vila 79' m Con: Elisa Álvarez (3) 3', 10', 35'; Cards: Sofía Ayuso (yellow card) 51' to 61'	Report	Try: Carla Arca 13' c Alysha Stone 23' c Mireia García 66' m Ana María Iglesias 75' m Con: Ana María Iglesias (2) 14', 24'; Pen: Ana María Iglesias (3) 28', 52', 55'	Referee: Jenny Lee

16 April 2023	CRAT Residencia RIALTA	26–17	Eibar Rugby Taldea	Elviña, A Coruña
12:00 CEST (UTC+2)	Try: Mariana Carolina Romero (2) 17' m, 42' c Isabel Martí 27' c Tania Martínez 70' c Con: Ana Iglesias (3) 27', 42', 70'; Cards: Judith Hernández (yellow card) 61' to 71'	Report	Try: Steffi Frances Hooson 51' m Yamila Alejandra Otero 63' m Amaiur Mayo 78' c Con: Adara Alfonso 78'	Referee: Belarmino Álvarez

15 April 2023	Corteva Cocos	5–26	Majadahonda (OBP)	La Cartuja, Seville
16:30 CEST (UTC+2)	Try: Merenia Marie Paraone 47' m	Report	Try: Isabel Romón 3' m Vico Gorrochategui (2) 35' c, 74' c Luisa Maria Pérez 68' c Con: Jade Cardouat (3) 36', 69', 75'	Referee: Eki Fanlo

== Relegation playoff ==
The team finishing in 7th place faces the runner-up of the Honor Division B, with the winner of this match playing in the 2023–24 Liga Iberdrola and the loser in the 2023–24 Honor Division B.

29 April 2023	Olímpico de Pozuelo	31–12	Getxo Giroa - Veolia	Sotoverde, Arroyo de la Encomienda
17:00 CEST (UTC+2)	Try: Marta Arriola 2' c penalty try (2) 12', 76'; Marina Martín 54' c Con: Ana Marina Sánchez (2) 3', 56'; Pen: Ana Marina Sánchez 35'; Cards: Beatriz Cabo (yellow card) 39' to 49'; Hannah Olivia Persson (yellow card) 78' to 80'	Report	Try: Haizea Arco 32' m Garazi Izagirre 45' c Con: Itsaso Reina 47'	Referee: Félix Villegas

== Play-offs ==
Semi-finals
1	Corteva Cocos	26
4	Eibar Rugby Taldea	12
2	Majadahonda	45
3	Crealia El Salvador	29

Final
1	Corteva Cocos	22
2	Majadahonda	39

=== Semi-finals ===
22 April 2023	Corteva Cocos	26–12	Eibar Rugby Taldea	La Cartuja, Seville
15:30 CEST (UTC+2)	Try: Lavinia Silia Taukalaliku 7' c Mele Hingano Tavake 10' c María De Las Huertas Román (2) 21' c, 62' m Con: Carolina Fernanda Alfaro (3) 8', 11', 22'; Cards: María De Las Huertas Román (yellow card) 31' to 41'; Marta Carmona (yellow card) 66' to 76'	Report	Try: Yamila Alejandra Otero 52' m Nerea García 76' c Con: Amaiur Mayo 77'	Referee: Jenny Lee

22 April 2023	Majadahonda	45–29	Crealia El Salvador	Valle del Arcipreste, Majadahonda
16:00 CEST (UTC+2)	Try: Alba Mireya Vives 15' c María Kimberly Marcos 25' c Marta Pro 29' m Vico Gorrochategui 37' c Cristina Cueto 65' m Lucía Díaz 71' c Claudia Pérez 76' c Con: Jade Cardouat (2) 15', 25'; Cristina López (3) 39', 71', 76'	Report	Try: Raquel García (2) 21' m, 46' c Alba Alpín 33' c Tecla Masoko 44' m Carmen Fernández 68' m Con: Alba Alpín (2) 34', 46'; Cards: Isabel Sierra (yellow card) 51' to 61'	Referee: Lorena Martínez

=== Final ===
29 April 2023	Corteva Cocos	22–39	Majadahonda	El Cuartillo, Cáceres
14:00 CEST (UTC+2)	Try: Kassandra Sylla 7' c Merenia Marie Paraone (2) 35' m, 44' m María De Las Huertas Román 40' m Con: Carolina Fernanda Alfaro 8'	Report	Try: Isabel Romón (2) 2' c, 76' m Claudia Pérez (2) 13' m, 70' m Alba Noa Castellano 20' c Luisina Contreras 59' c Con: Cristina López (3) 3', 21', 60'; Pen: Cristina López 25'	Referee: Lorena Martínez

== Leading scorers ==
=== Most points ===
Rank	Player	Club	Points
1	(Chile) Carolina Fernanda Alfaro	Corteva Cocos	125
2	(Spain) Alba Alpín	Crealia El Salvador	84
3	(Spain) Ana María Iglesias	Sant Cugat	74
4	(New Zealand) Hosanna Arietta Aumua	Eibar Rugby Taldea	70
5	(Spain) Ana Marina Sánchez	Olímpico de Pozuelo	63
6	(Tonga) Lavinia Silia Taukalaliku	Corteva Cocos	60
7	(Spain) Claudia Pérez	Majadahonda	55
8	(Spain) Vico Gorrochategui	Majadahonda	50
8	(Germany) Alysha Stone	Sant Cugat	50
10	(Canada) Sabrina Poulin	Eibar Rugby Taldea	48

=== Most tries ===
Rank	Player	Club	Tries
1	(New Zealand) Hosanna Arietta Aumua	Eibar Rugby Taldea	14
2	(Tonga) Lavinia Silia Taukalaliku	Corteva Cocos	12
3	(Spain) Claudia Pérez	Majadahonda	11
4	(Spain) Vico Gorrochategui	Majadahonda	10
4	(Germany) Alysha Stone	Sant Cugat	10
6	(Spain) María De Las Huertas Román	Corteva Cocos	9
7	(Spain) Marta Carmona	Corteva Cocos	8
8	(New Zealand) Rianna Mere Aspinall	Eibar Rugby Taldea	7
8	(Spain) Amaiur Mayo	Eibar Rugby Taldea	7
8	(Spain) Arantzazu Olabarria	Complutense Cisneros	7
8	(New Zealand) Merenia Marie Paraone	Corteva Cocos	7
8	(Venezuela) Mariana Carolina Romero	CRAT Residencia RIALTA	7
8	(New Zealand) Ocean Tierney	Crealia El Salvador	7

== Super Cup ==
I Supercopa Iberdrola de Rugby
- Countries: Spain
- Number of teams: 2
- Date: 24 September 2022
- Champions: Majadahonda (1st title)
- Runners-up: Corteva Cocos
- Matches played: 1
- Tries scored: 8 (average 8 per match)

After the 2022 General Assembly, the Spanish Rugby Federation announced the creation of a new competition, the Women's Super Cup, that would pit Corteva Cocos, as champions of the previous season league and Majadahonda as winners of the regular season, and would act as start of the season. Majadahonda dominated the match and won their first title after 28 years.

24 September 2022	Corteva Cocos	12–36	Majadahonda	Estadio El Montecillo, Aranda de Duero
16:00 CEST (UTC+2)	Try: María De Las Huertas Román 15' c Lavinia Silia Taukalaliku 77' m Con: Carolina Fernanda Alfaro 16'; Cards: Lucía Gayoso (yellow card) 31' to 41'; Ana Peralta (yellow card) 38' to 48'	Report	Try: Maria Kimberly Marcos (2) 8' m, 39' m Eva Aguirre 56' c Cristina Cueto 59' c Silvia Hernandez-Vaquero 67' m Marta Cantabrana 74' c Con: Marta Pro (3) 57', 60', 75'	Referee: Lorena Martínez
