= División de Honor Femenina de Rugby =

Spanish rugby union league competition

División de Honor de Rugby
- Current season, competition or edition: 2025–26 Liga Iberdrola de Rugby
- Sport: Rugby union
- Founded: 2010; 16 years ago
- Owner: Federación Española de Rugby
- No. of teams: 8
- Country: Spain
- Most recent champion: CR El Salvador (2nd title)
- Most titles: INEF Barcelona (11 titles)
- Broadcasters: TVE; FERUGBYTV (Live Streams and VOD)
- Sponsor: Iberdrola
- Relegation to: División de Honor B
- Related competitions: Copa de la Reina de Rugby Campeonato de España Femenino de Rugby
- Website: ferugby.es

The División de Honor Femenina, currently known for sponsorship purposes as the Liga Iberdrola, is the top Spanish league competition for women's rugby union clubs. The league began in 2010 and consists of eight teams. Clubs are relegated to and promoted from Regional Championships.

There were two competitions before establishment of División de Honor Femenina in 2010, Campeonato de España Femenino (1989–1997) and Copa de la Reina (1998–2010).

== Competition ==
=== Format ===
The División de Honor comprises regular season and playoff. Regular season takes place between November and May, with every team playing each other once. Then the teams are split into 2 groups. Group A comprises the first 4 placed and Group B the 4 last. Teams play again against the others on their group, thus reaching a total of 10 rounds. Points are awarded according to the following:

- 4 points for a win
- 2 points for a draw
- 1 bonus point is awarded to a team scoring 3 tries more than the opponent.
- 1 bonus point is awarded to a team that loses a match by 7 points or fewer

After the regular season, the top six teams play a championship playoff. The first two classify to the semi-finals and the 4 next play the quarter-finals.

=== Promotion and relegation ===
The bottom team in the standings is relegated to Honor Division B, while the second-to-last plays a relegation playoff on neutral ground against Honor Division B runner up.

== Past winners ==
=== Campeonato de España Femenino ===
Year	Champion	Runner-up	Score
1989	(Catalonia) INEF Barcelona (1º)	(Community of Madrid) CEU Madrid	10–6
1990	(Community of Madrid) CEU Madrid (1º)	(Catalonia) Puig Castellar	30–0
1991	(Community of Madrid) Alcobendas RC (1º)	(Catalonia) INEF Barcelona	24–0
1992	(Community of Madrid) Alcobendas RC (2º)	(Catalonia) INEF Barcelona	4–0
1993	(Community of Madrid) Majadahonda (1º)	(Catalonia) Bonanova	6–0
1994	(Community of Madrid) Majadahonda (2º)	(Catalonia) Bonanova	15–0
1995	(Catalonia) INEF Barcelona (2º)	(Community of Madrid) Majadahonda	10–0
1996	(Community of Madrid) Getafe RC (1º)	(Catalonia) BUC	10–0
1997	(Community of Madrid) Getafe RC (2º)	(Catalonia) L'Hospitalet	15–0

=== Copa de la Reina ===
Year	Champion	Runner-up	Score
1998	(Catalonia) L'Hospitalet (1º)	(Community of Madrid) Majadahonda	71–12
1999	(Community of Madrid) Liceo Francés (1º)	(Community of Madrid) Majadahonda	24–12
2000	(Community of Madrid) Liceo Francés (2º)	(Community of Madrid) Majadahonda	20–6
2001	(Basque Country (autonomous community)) Getxo Artea (1º)	(Catalonia) L'Hospitalet	13–10
2002	(Catalonia) L'Hospitalet (2º)	(Community of Madrid) UCM 2M12	24–20
2003	(Community of Madrid) UCM 2M12 (1º)	(Catalonia) BUC	18–6
2004	(Community of Madrid) UCM 2M12 (2º)	(Basque Country (autonomous community)) Getxo	14–13
2005	(Catalonia) INEF Barcelona (3º)	(Community of Madrid) Olímpico Pozuelo	26–12
2006	(Catalonia) INEF Barcelona (4º)	(Community of Madrid) Olímpico Pozuelo	19–18
2007	(Catalonia) INEF Barcelona (5º)	(Community of Madrid) Olímpico Pozuelo	25–19
2008	(Basque Country (autonomous community)) Getxo Artea (2º)	(Catalonia) INEF Barcelona	7–3
2009	(Catalonia) INEF Barcelona (6º)	(Basque Country (autonomous community)) Getxo	26–10
2010	(Catalonia) INEF Barcelona (7º)	(Basque Country (autonomous community)) Getxo	33–5

=== División de Honor Femenina de Rugby ===
Season	Champion	Runner-up	Third	Fourth	Relegated	Promoted
2010–11	(Catalonia) INEF Barcelona (8th)	(Galicia (Spain)) CRAT Univ. da Coruña	(Community of Madrid) Majadahonda	(Catalonia) GEiEG	(Basque Country (autonomous community)) Gaztedi	(Community of Madrid) XV Sanse Scrum (Community of Madrid) Complutense Cisneros
2011–12	(Catalonia) INEF Barcelona (9th)	(Galicia (Spain)) CRAT Univ. da Coruña	(Basque Country (autonomous community)) Bizkarians	(Community of Madrid) Majadahonda	(Community of Madrid) XV Sanse Scrum	(Catalonia) Gòtics
2012–13	(Catalonia) INEF Barcelona (10th)	(Community of Madrid) Olímpico de Pozuelo	(Galicia (Spain)) CRAT Univ. da Coruña	(Community of Madrid) Complutense Cisneros	(Catalonia) Gòtics	(Community of Madrid) XV Sanse Scrum
2013–14	(Community of Madrid) Olímpico de Pozuelo (1st)	(Galicia (Spain)) CRAT Univ. da Coruña	(Catalonia) INEF Barcelona	(Catalonia) GEiEG	None	None
2014–15	(Galicia (Spain)) CRAT Univ. da Coruña (1st)	(Basque Country (autonomous community)) Getxo Artea	(Community of Madrid) Olímpico de Pozuelo	(Catalonia) GEiEG	(Community of Madrid) Complutense Cisneros	(Community of Madrid) XV Hortaleza
2015–16	(Catalonia) INEF Barcelona (11th)	(Community of Madrid) Majadahonda	(Community of Madrid) XV Sanse Scrum	(Community of Madrid) Olímpico de Pozuelo	None	None
2016–17	(Community of Madrid) Olímpico de Pozuelo (2nd)	(Galicia (Spain)) CRAT Univ. da Coruña	(Basque Country (autonomous community)) Getxo Artea	(Community of Madrid) Majadahonda	(Catalonia) GEiEG	(Community of Madrid) Complutense Cisneros
2017–18	(Community of Madrid) Olímpico de Pozuelo (3rd)	(Community of Madrid) Majadahonda	(Galicia (Spain)) CRAT Univ. da Coruña	(Community of Madrid) Complutense Cisneros	(Basque Country (autonomous community)) Getxo Artea	(Andalusia) Corteva Cocos
2018–19	(Galicia (Spain)) CRAT Univ. da Coruña (2nd)	(Catalonia) INEF-L'Hospitalet	(Community of Madrid) Majadahonda	(Community of Madrid) Complutense Cisneros	(Community of Madrid) XV Hortaleza	(Castile and León) Crealia El Salvador
2019–20	(Andalusia) Universitario Sevilla CR (1st)	(Community of Madrid) Majadahonda	(Community of Madrid) Complutense Cisneros	(Community of Madrid) Sanse Scrum	(Castile and León) Crealia El Salvador	(Valencian Community) Les Abelles
2020–21	(Community of Madrid) Complutense Cisneros (1st)	(Community of Madrid) Majadahonda	(Basque Country (autonomous community)) Eibar	(Andalusia) Corteva Cocos	(Valencian Community) Les Abelles	(Catalonia) CR Sant Cugat
2021–22	(Andalusia) Corteva Cocos (2nd)	(Community of Madrid) Majadahonda	(Community of Madrid) Olímpico de Pozuelo	(Community of Madrid) Complutense Cisneros	(Community of Madrid) Sanse Scrum	(Castile and León) Crealia El Salvador
2022–23	(Community of Madrid) Majadahonda (3rd)	(Andalusia) Corteva Cocos	(Castile and León) Crealia El Salvador	(Basque Country (autonomous community)) Eibar Rugby Taldea	(Community of Madrid) Complutense Cisneros	(Catalonia) AVR FC Barcelona
2023–24	(Community of Madrid) Silicius Majadahonda (4th)	(Galicia (Spain)) CRAT Residencia RIALTA	(Catalonia) AVR FC Barcelona (Catalonia) Sant Cugat		(Basque Country (autonomous community)) Eibar Rugby Taldea (Community of Madrid) Olímpico de Pozuelo	(Community of Madrid) Complutense Cisneros (Basque Country (autonomous community)) Getxo Artea
2024–25	(Castile and León) Colina Clinic El Salvador (1st)	(Community of Madrid) Silicius Majadahonda	(Andalusia) Simón Verde Magnolia Cocos (Catalonia) Sant Cugat		(Catalonia) Social Energy AVRFCB	(Community of Madrid) Olímpico de Pozuelo
2025–26	(Castile and León) Colina Clinic El Salvador (2nd)	(Community of Madrid) Silicius Majadahonda	(Basque Country (autonomous community)) Getxo Artea (Galicia (Spain)) CRAT Residencia RIALTA		(Community of Madrid) Olímpico de Pozuelo	(Catalonia) AVR FC Barcelona

=== Titles by team ===
Club	Titles	Runners-up	Years champion
(Catalonia) INEF Barcelona	11	4	1989, 1995, 2005, 2006, 2007, 2009, 2010, 2011, 2012, 2013, 2016
(Community of Madrid) Majadahonda	4	11	1993, 1994, 2023, 2024
(Community of Madrid) Olímpico Pozuelo	3	4	2014, 2017, 2018
(Galicia (Spain)) CRAT	2	5	2015, 2019
(Basque Country (autonomous community)) Getxo	2	4	2001, 2008
(Catalonia) L'Hospitalet	2	2	1998, 2002
(Community of Madrid) UCM 2M12	2	1	2003, 2004
(Andalusia) Cocos	2	1	2020, 2022
(Community of Madrid) Alcobendas	2	0	1991, 1992
(Community of Madrid) Getafe RC	2	0	1996, 1997
(Community of Madrid) Liceo Francés	2	0	1999, 2000
(Castile and León) CR El Salvador	2	0	2025, 2026
(Community of Madrid) CEU Madrid	1	1	1990
(Community of Madrid) Complutense Cisneros	1	0	2021

== See also ==
- División de Honor de Rugby
- Copa del Rey de Rugby
