= CAR Sevilla =

Spanish rugby union club, based in Seville

- Full name: Club Amigos del Rugby Sevilla
- Founded: 1978; 48 years ago
- Location: Seville, Andalusia, Spain
- Ground(s): Polideportivo San Pablo, Seville
- President: Manuel Lezama
- Coach: José Ignacio Moreno
- League: División de Honor B de Rugby
- 2019-20: 9th place
Team kit

Official website
- www.clubamigosrugby.com

Club de Amigos del Rugby (CAR) Sevilla is a Spanish rugby union club which plays its home matches at Polideportivo de San Pablo, Seville, Spain. Founded during the 1976–77 season, it is one of the main Andalusian rugby clubs.

== History ==
C.A.R. was established during the 1976–77 season, after the former R.A.C.A. (Real Automóvil Club Andalucía), which competed between 1975 and 1977 in Division de Honór, disbanded. During its inception, it was made up of the majority of the staff of the defunct R.A.C.A, continuing the structure and the lower categories of the former disbanded club. Thus, Club Amigos del Rugby ("Friends of Rugby") was born in 1978. In their first season, the team had to compete in Primera Nacional (which back then, was the second division of the Spanish rugby), achieving the promotion to División de Honor in that first season.

The first executives board put in functioning a senior team playing in Segunda División Nacional Grupo Sur, a youth team in the provincial category and an under-16 team, as well as the tutelage and filiality of Instituto Pino Montano in the under-16 provincial category, under the impulse of their first chairman, Eugenio Silvestre Taupenot. The motto proposed by those executives was: “Fomentar y practicar el juego del rugby” ("To foster and practice the game of rugby").

Between the 1978–79 and 1981–82, the league was made up by 4 groups, with C.A.R. competing against the rest of the Andalusian clubs. In the 1978–79 season, C.A.R. ended first in the South Group, which gave the club to fight for the title of national champion against the other 3 group champions. However, this fight for the title did not happen, as the Spanish Rugby Federation declared that the 4 teams were champions.

In the 1979–80, C.A.R. reached again the first place of the South Group, but this time, the fight for the championship, ending at the 4th place. In the 2 following seasons, the team ended 6th and 2nd in the South Group, making the club unable to fight for the national title. In the 1982–83 season, the league system returned to the traditional single-group one vs one formula and C.A.R. did not was part of the championship.

In the following years, the club signed a deal with a college of the city named Portaceli, which gave the name to the team during the following 10 years, until 1995. In this moment, the club played three seasons in Segunda Categoria Nacional, the Primera Nacional, in 1984–85, 1990-81 and 1994–95. In 1995, C.A.R. changed name again, courtesy to a new sponsor, Inés Rosales, which maintained until 2006 At this stage, the club played in the second level of the Spanish rugby during 9 seasons (3 in Primera Nacional between 1995–96 and 1997–98 seasons, and 6th in the newly created Division de Honor B between the 1999-00 and 2000–01 seasons, and later, between 2002–03 and 2005–06.

In 2007, C.A.R. joined forces with another important club of the city, C.D. Mairena, competing together in the Spanish second division under the name of its main sponsor, the insurance company Helvetia. Said team, born from the union of the clubs, became a new club in 2014, the Alqatara Rugby Club Andalucia, bestowing C.A.R. its licence to the new entity in order to compete in División de Honor B, with which began, to maintain a branch of team relationship, in the same way as its shareholder, C.D. Mairena.

After featuring illustrious chairman such as Felipe del Valle and Andrés Palma, other figures of the club such as José Manuel Ruiz Navarro, Paco Alonso, Juan Moreno, Manuel García Bañez, Manuel Joaquín Jacome Luna ” Jaco”, Carlos Jaime, Manolo García Marchena and Alfonso Rodríguez Chacón exercised the role of chairman as of currently.

== Currently ==
Currently, the club has its training field at Polideportivo de San Pablo, with two sénior teams and other teams, each one in every category of grassroots rugby: under-6, under-8, under-10, under-12, under-14, under-16, and under-18. It also features a former players' team, CarVets, and a mothers' team, las LaCARtijas.
