= Helvetia Rugby =

Spanish rugby union club, based in Seville

- Full name: Alqatara Rugby Club Andalucía
- Founded: 2007; 19 years ago
- Disbanded: 2017; 9 years ago
- Location: Seville, Spain
- Ground: Instalaciones Deportivas La Cartuja (Capacity: 1,932)
- Chairman: Julio Estalella
- Coach: Nicolás Sanfilippo
- Captain: Beltrán González
- League: División de Honor B
- 2016–17: 12º in Group C
Team kit

Alqatara Rugby Club Andalucía called Helvetia Rugby for reasons of sponsorship, was a Spanish rugby union team from Seville, founded in 2014 by a collaboration agreement between the CAR Sevilla and Unión Aljarafe Sevilla to compete in the División de Honor B. The team was disbanded in 2017 at the end of the collaboration agreement.

== History ==
Although the club was founded in 2014, its origin lies in the joining of forces of the CAR Sevilla and the Unión Aljarafe Sevilla that in 2007 they pooled their resources and their best players to compete as a single team in the second division of national rugby, maintaining their independence at regional level and lower categories. That single team already had the sponsorship of Helvetia and was known as such. In 2014 Alqatara was registered as a new club in the Andalusian Rugby Federation, receiving the license to compete in the Division of Honor B that was ceded by Club Amigos del Rugby, and registering both to the C.A.R. like the C.D. Mairena as a subsidiary team.

In 2016 the Club de Rugby San Jerónimo, also from the Andalusian capital, became Alqatara's third affiliate club. Until 2017 when the collaboration between the founding clubs ended.

== Season to season ==
Season	Tier	Division	Pos.	Notes
2007–08	2	División de Honor B	4th	
2008–09	2	División de Honor B	4th	
2009–10	2	División de Honor B	6th	
2010–11	2	División de Honor B	6th	
2011–12	2	División de Honor B	8th	
2012–13	2	División de Honor B	9th	
2013–14	2	División de Honor B	4th	
2014–15	2	División de Honor B	6th	
2015–16	2	División de Honor B	8th	
2016–17	2	División de Honor B	12th	↓

- 10 seasons in División de Honor B

== See also ==
- CAR Sevilla
- Unión Aljarafe Sevilla
- División de Honor B

=== External links ===
- Official website
- CD Mairena official website
