= Immaculate Heart of Mary College, Portaceli =

- Colegio Inmaculado Corazón de María-Portaceli

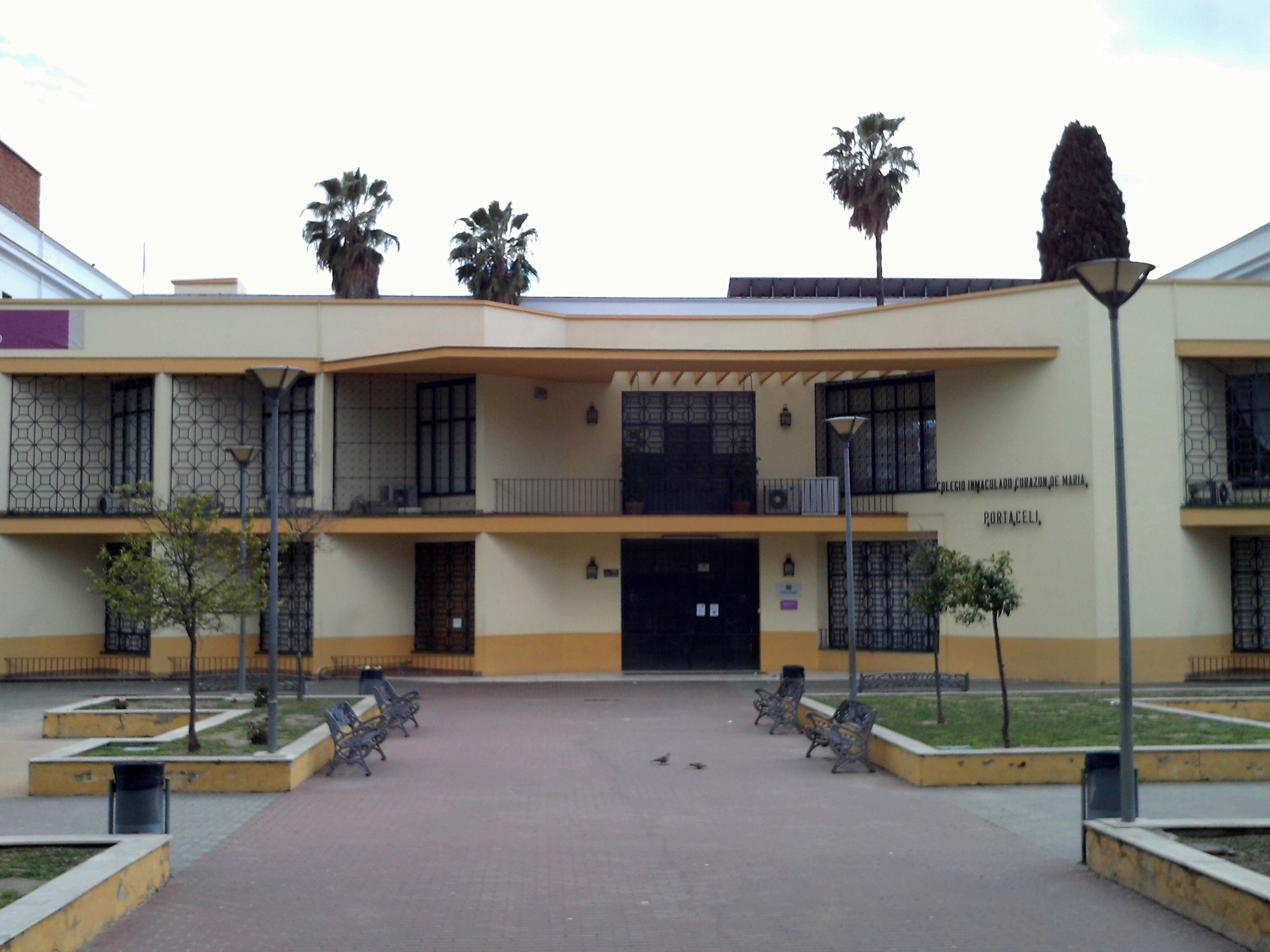
- Colegio Inmaculado Corazón de María Portaceli. Sevilla, Andalucía, España, in 2018

Location
- Seville; Spain
- Coordinates: 37°22′59″N 5°58′40″W

Information
- Type: Jesuit, Catholic
- Established: 1950; 76 years ago
- Director: Álvaro Garcia Medina
- Staff: 143 teachers
- Gender: Co-educational
- Enrollment: 2,353
- Publication: Portaceli
- Website: Immaculate Heart of Mary College

Immaculate Heart of Mary College, Portaceli, Seville, covers pre-primary through baccalaureate and technical school. It was founded by the Jesuits in 1950.

The College offers the Baccalaureate in both Science and Technology and Humanities and Social Sciences. Bilingual education, Spanish and English, is emphasized. Technical education includes the three areas of Commercial, Administrative Management, and Electrical Installations, Equipment, and Apparatus.

Immaculate Heart of Mary high school has been ranked among the top 100 schools in Spain.

== See also ==
- List of Jesuit sites
