= Unión Aljarafe Sevilla =

Spanish rugby union club, based in Seville

UAS Rugby
- Full name: Unión Aljarafe Sevilla; CD Rugby Mairena – Universitario Sevilla CR
- Union: Spanish Rugby Federation
- Nickname(s): Cocos, Cocodrilas
- Founded: 1968; 58 years ago
- Location: Seville
- Ground: I.D. La Cartuja (Capacity: 3,000)
- Chairman: José Luis Gómez Cordones (Mairena Rugby); Mariola Rus Rufino (Cocos Rugby)
- Coach(es): Saúl Espina (Mairena Rugby); Pablo Arévalo (Cocos Rugby)
- League: Liga Iberdrola
- 2023–24: Quarter-finals
1st kit	2nd kit

Official website
- rugbysevilla.es

Unión Aljarafe Sevilla, is a Spanish rugby union club. The club currently competes in the Liga Iberdrola, the 1st level of Spanish women's club rugby, competition they have won 2 times, under the name of University of Seville CR, and currently known as Simón Verde Magnolia Cocos for sponsorship purposes.

The men's team plays on the Andalusia regional tournament under the name Club Deportivo Rugby Mairena. The club is based in the city of Seville in the autonomous community of Andalusia. They play in black and green.

== History ==
The Unión Aljarafe Sevilla is the union of two rugby clubs that compete in all categories of Andalusian rugby, both in the female and male categories, having different names depending on the category in which they are competing. They have the C.D. Rugby Mairena that competes in all the existing male rugby categories in Andalusia from wild boars to seniors. And until 2017 it also competed in the División de Honor B (the second Spanish division) under the name of Helvetia Rugby.

Universitario de Sevilla CR competes in the women’s category and is one of the most established clubs in Andalusia. After several consecutive years in the promotion phase for the women’s División de Honor, the club won the División de Honor B in 2018 and ascended to the top category, becoming the first Andalusian team to do so. Founded in the 1960s, the club has over 50 years of history and has operated under various names, including C.R. Medicina and Universidad de Sevilla, before arriving at its current title.

In recent years they have had several sporting successes at a collective and individual level, with international players who have even competed in world championships with the Spanish national team. At a collective level they have played seasons in all existing national and regional categories, achieving a runner-up position in the División de Honor (highest national category) in the 2000/01 season, or a Copa F.E.R., as well as other F.A.R. cups (Andalusian Rugby Federation) and regional championships.

== Honours ==
- Liga Iberdrola
  - Champions: (2) 2019–20, 2021–22
  - Runners–Up (1) 2022–23
- Women's Iberian Cup
  - Champions: (1) 2020-21
- División de Honor
  - Runners–Up (1) 2000–01
