= RC L'Hospitalet =

Spanish rugby union club, based in L'Hospitalet de Llobregat

L'Hospitalet
- Full name: Rugby Club L'Hospitalet
- Founded: 1973; 53 years ago
- Location: L'Hospitalet de Llobregat, Spain
- Ground: Camp Municipal de La Feixa Llarga
- President: Francisco Javier López
- Coach: Jordi Sánchez
- League: División de Honor B
- 2023–24: 4º, Group B
1st kit	2nd kit

Rugby Club L'Hospitalet is a Spanish rugby union team based in L'Hospitalet de Llobregat (Barcelona). Founded in 1973 as Unió Esportiva Bellvitge, it changed its name to the current one in 1984. The club has won the Spanish women's rugby championship three times.

== History ==
The club was founded in 1973.

== Home ground ==
RC L'Hospitalet plays its games at the Municipal Rugby Field, which is part of the Feixa Llarga sports complex, in Bellvitge, a complex where there are also other facilities such as the Municipal Football Stadium or the Municipal Baseball Field. The pitch, made of natural grass, has dimensions of 140m x 70m. The venue has grandstands for approx. 320 spectators.

== Season to season ==
Season	Tier	Division	Pos.	Notes
1987–88	2	Primera Nacional	6th	
1988–89	2	Primera Nacional	7th	
1989–90	2	Primera Nacional	4th	
1990–91	2	Primera Nacional	7th	Relegated
1991–92	3	Segunda Nacional		Promoted
1992–93	2	Primera Nacional	10th	
1993–94	2	Primera Nacional	12th	
1994–95	2	Primera Nacional	4th	
1995–96	2	Primera Nacional	4th	
1996–97	2	Primera Nacional	1st	
1997–98	2	Primera Nacional	2nd	Promoted
1998–99	2	División de Honor B	4th	
1999–00	2	División de Honor B	9th	Relegated
2000–01	3	Primera Nacional	1st	Promoted
2001–02	2	División de Honor B	2nd	

Season	Tier	Division	Pos.	Notes
2002–03	1	División de Honor	8th	
2003–04	1	División de Honor	9th	Relegated
2004–05	2	División de Honor B	4th	
2005–06	2	División de Honor B	8th	Relegated
2006–07	3	Primera Nacional	5th	
2007–08	3	Primera Nacional	1st	
2008–09	3	Primera Nacional	7th	
2009–10	3	Primera Nacional	3rd	
2010–11	3	Primera Nacional	1st	Promoted
2011–12	2	División de Honor B	7th	
2012–13	2	División de Honor B	6th	
2013–14	2	División de Honor B	7th	
2014–15	2	División de Honor B	10th	
2015–16	2	División de Honor B		

- 2 seasons in División de Honor
- 9 seasons in División de Honor B
