= Majadahonda =

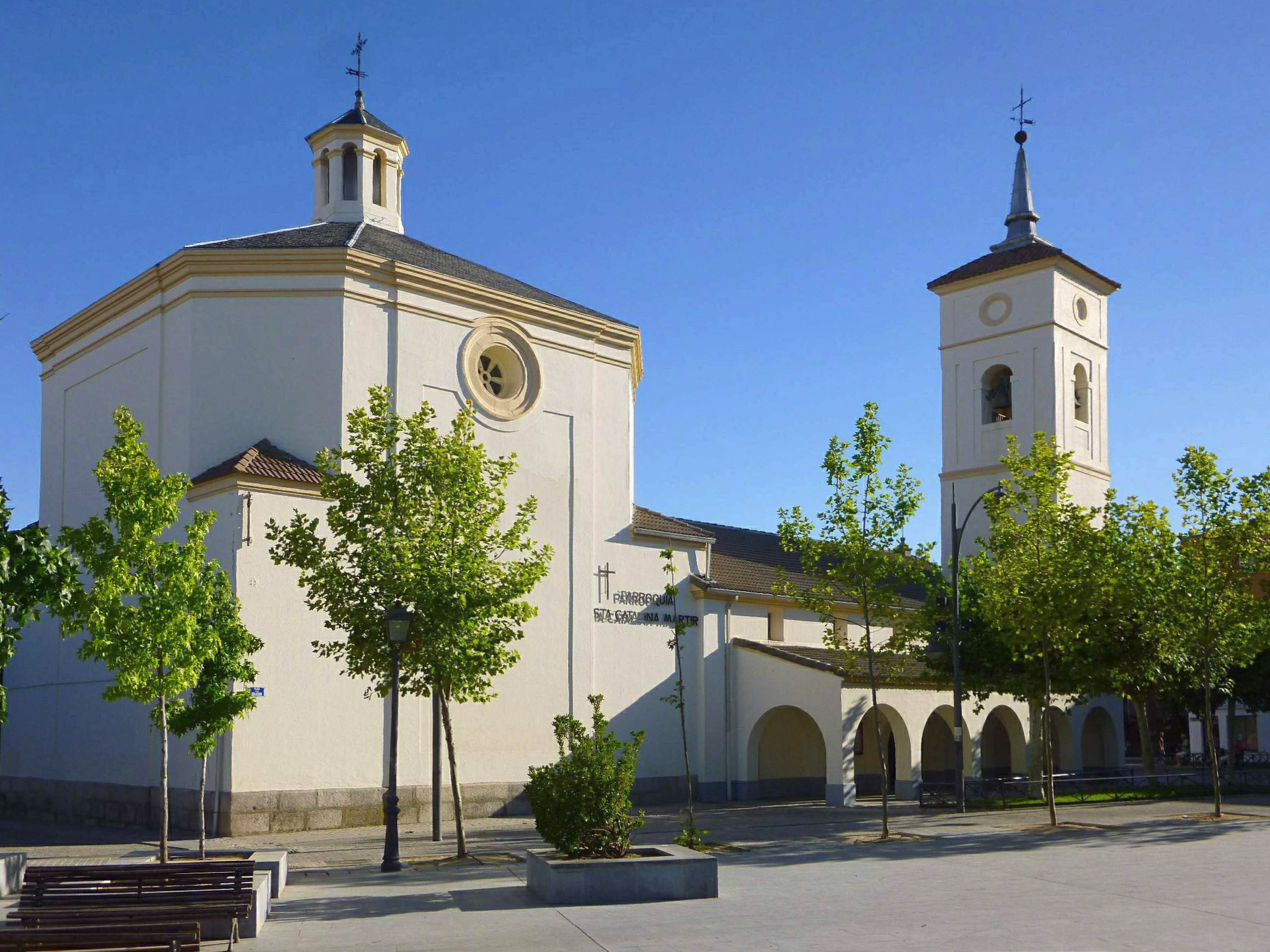
- Church of Santa Catalina Mártir

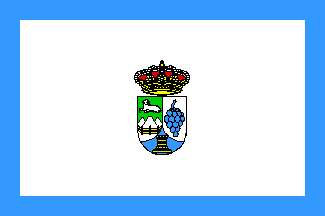
- Flag Coat of arms

- Location of Majadahonda within Spain
- Coordinates: 40°28′22″N 3°52′20″W
- Country: Spain
- Region: Community of Madrid
- Comarca: Madrid metropolitan area

Government
  - Mayor: Lola Moreno (PP)

Area
  - Total: 38.48 km^{2} (14.86 sq mi)
- Elevation: 743 m (2,438 ft)

Population (2025-01-01)
  - Total: 73,625
  - Density: 1,913/km^{2} (4,956/sq mi)
- Demonym: Majariegos
- Time zone: UTC+1 (CET)
  - Summer (DST): UTC+2 (CEST)
- Postal codes in Spain: 28220, 28221, 28222
- Area code: 34 (Spain) + 91 (Madrid)
- Patron Saint: St. Catherine of Alexandria
- Climate: Csa
- Website: Official website

Majadahonda (Spanish: [maxaðaˈonda]) is a municipality in Spain, situated 16 km (9.9 mi) northwest of Madrid, in the Community of Madrid.

It lies alongside the motorway A6 Madrid-A Coruña.

The Puerta de Hierro university (public) hospital was relocated to Majadahonda from the western part of the city of Madrid into a newly built medical complex in 2009.

== History ==
By the 16th century Majadahonda had become a proper village, with a population of about 400 inhabitants. At the end of the 16th century there were almost two hundred houses and some 800 inhabitants. Majadahonda is mentioned in Miguel de Cervantes' Don Quixote and El Buscón by Francisco de Quevedo. The centre of the village at the time was the Church of Santa Catherine, a small hospital and a modest inn. The town extended through streets named San Roque, Calle Real, and Calle Christ.

In the 18th century there was a considerable population increase, reaching a total of some 800 inhabitants, according to the census of Floridablanca. The majority of the men were day laborers, serving a minority of rich farmers and landed gentry.

In 1812, during the War of Spanish Independence, Majadahonda was the site of a battle between the French and British troops which left the town in ruins. Ecclesiastical and civil confiscation enforced the sale of land, which was acquired by the rich and powerful nobility. One of them, the marqués de Remisa, used his position with the railroad company to have a train station built on his property, which is the origin of the present station, relocated from its original site at El Plantio, but still some distance from the town.

The Spanish Civil War greatly damaged the area, which, like Madrid, was mostly Republican. From 1936 to 1939 the town was mostly deserted. The town was entirely reconstructed with a more modern grid format.

Throughout the 1960s a process of urban transformation and population increase took place. Majadahonda abandoned agricultural activities, becoming a dormitory town for Madrid, and thus highly dependent upon the service sector.

The political changes across Spain have been broadly supported by Majadahonda, which voted in favor of the Spanish Constitution of 1978. In the first municipal elections, the old oligarchy lost the power, and a new City council was democratically elected.

== Transmitter ==
Near Majadahonda, at Las Rozas (Geographical coordinates: 40°29'6"N 3°52'27"W), is the most powerful broadcasting station in Spain, which transmits the programs of RNE-1 (Radio Nacional de España) on 585 kHz at 600 kW. The antenna is on a 264 meters tall mast built in 1962, which was then the tallest structure in Madrid area.

The facility also has a second mast, 130 metres (430 ft) tall used for broadcasting RNE-5 on 657 kHz and COPE Madrid on 999 kHz at 50 kW power.

== Sports ==
CF Rayo Majadahonda is based in the municipality, it played most of the years in 2B division but eventually in 2A during 2018/19 season.

Additionally, the town is well known for its sporting establishments, including a public indoor swimming pool (now closed since 2021), an athletics stadium, a golf course, and several padel, tennis and football facilities.

== Twin towns ==
- Clamart, France

There is a park named after that French town. It is located near the Majadahonda train station.

- Ferencváros. There is a park named Ferencváros south from the city centre. Ferencváros is an urban district of Budapest, Hungary.

== Notable people ==
- Blanca Hervás, sprinter
