= Olímpico RC =

Spanish rugby union club, based in Pozuelo de Alarcón

Olímpico Rugby Club
- Founded: 1964; 62 years ago
- Location: Pozuelo de Alarcón, Spain
- Ground: Valle de las Cañas
- President: Jose Ignacio del Olmo (also coach)
- League: División de Honor B de Rugby
Team kit

Olímpico RC is a Spanish rugby union team based in Pozuelo de Alarcón, Spain.

== History ==
The club was founded in 1964.
