= Club de Rugby Sant Cugat =

Spanish rugby union club, based in Sant Cugat del Vallès

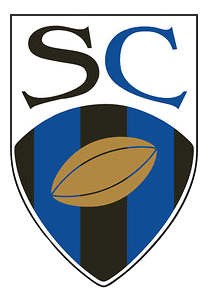
- Founded: 1987; 39 years ago
- Location: Sant Cugat del Vallès, Spain
- Ground: La Guinardera
- Chairman: Miguel Pelayo
- Coach: Martin García
- League: División de Honor B
Team kit

Club de Rugby Sant Cugat is a Spanish rugby union team based in Sant Cugat del Vallès.

== History ==
The club was founded in 1987.
