= Pozuelo de Alarcón =

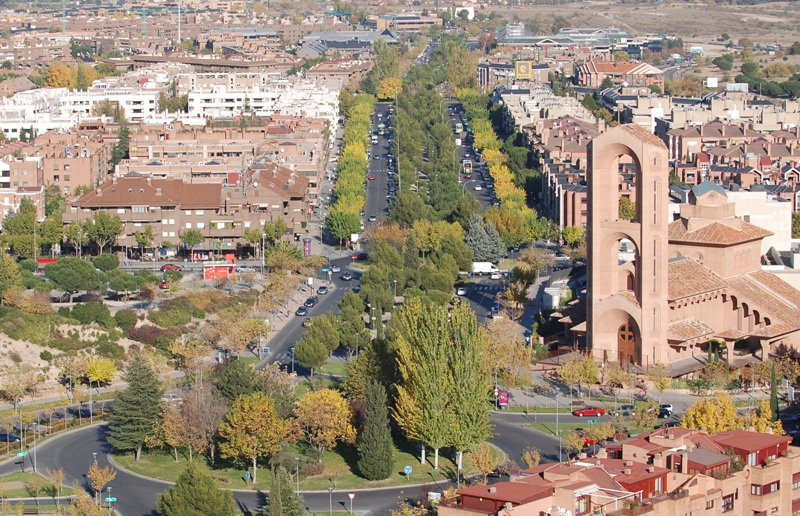
- View of Pozuelo de Alarcón, looking down the Avenida de Europa.

- Flag Coat of arms

- Location within Spain Location within Community of Madrid
- Coordinates: 40°26′10″N 3°48′50″W
- Country: Spain
- Region: Community of Madrid

Area
  - Total: 43.2 km^{2} (16.7 sq mi)
- Highest elevation: 690 m (2,260 ft)

Population (2025-01-01)
  - Total: 89,770
  - Density: 2,080/km^{2} (5,380/sq mi)
- Postcode: 28223 and 28224
- Website: Official website

Pozuelo de Alarcón (Spanish pronunciation: [poˈθwelo ðe alaɾˈkon]) is a municipality in the Community of Madrid, Spain. Bordering the Moncloa-Aravaca district of Madrid proper to its west, Pozuelo de Alarcón is surrounded by large Mediterranean pine-tree forests: the Casa de Campo, the Monte del Pardo, and the Monte del Pilar. As of 2022, it ranks as the wealthiest municipality in Spain. La Finca, an isolated luxury residential area known by its affluent residents, most notably football players, lies within the municipality bounds.

== History ==
Pozuelo has become a low-density residential area during recent decades, as new residential developments have spread over formerly agricultural lands. New transportation infrastructure is approved by the local government. Notable infrastructure developments include the M-40 (the second, counting outwards, of Madrid's ring motorways) and the new 'Metro Ligero' (light rail) line ML2 of the Madrid metro system, which was built in summer 2007 to connect Pozuelo with the Aluche district in the city of Madrid. Two stations also serve Pozuelo: "Pozuelo" and "El Barrial-Centro Commercial Pozuelo" of the Madrid area local train system, the "Cercanias". Road access is provided by the A6 and the M503, with the Madrid orbital M40 running to the west.

Pozuelo has one of the highest average per capita incomes in Madrid. According to a report by the Institute of Statistics of the Comunidad de Madrid, Pozuelo's average income level ranks highest, by a notable margin, amongst the municipalities of the Region of Madrid.

Pozuelo has a number of urban parks, some of them elongated and serving to separate different areas of the town. The Avenida de Europa is an urban development designed around a wide boulevard.

A distinctive religious building in the municipality is the Roman Catholic Church of Santa María de Caná, a post-conciliar brick building by Fernando Higueras.

A conservative stronghold, the ayuntamiento (the local government institution) has been ruled by political conservatives since the first democratic elections of the modern Spanish democracy took place. The current mayor, Paloma Tejero, was elected in 2023. Among the notable people that have lived there are former Real Madrid player Cristiano Ronaldo, who lived there for nine years, and Carlos Sainz, a Spanish World Rally Champion. Sainz was also the first person to be made an honorary citizen of the town in 2010.

The local festivities, the "Fiestas Patronales", take place in July and in the beginning of September. The municipality also celebrates las "Fiestas del Carmen", "Fiestas de San Sebastián", "Fiestas de La Virgen de Consolación", and "Fiestas de Navidad".

== Climate ==
Temperatures in Pozuelo de Alarcón are cooler than Madrid's all year round due to its proximity to Madrid's Sierra de Guadarrama Mountains, about 30 kilometers northwest of Pozuelo.

== International relations ==
=== Twin towns – sister cities ===
Pozuelo de Alarcón is twinned with:

- Poznań, Poland
- Issy-les-Moulineaux, France
- Recanati, Italy
- Naucalpan de Juárez, Mexico
- Bir Lehlou, Western Sahara
- Xicheng (Beijing), China

== Education ==
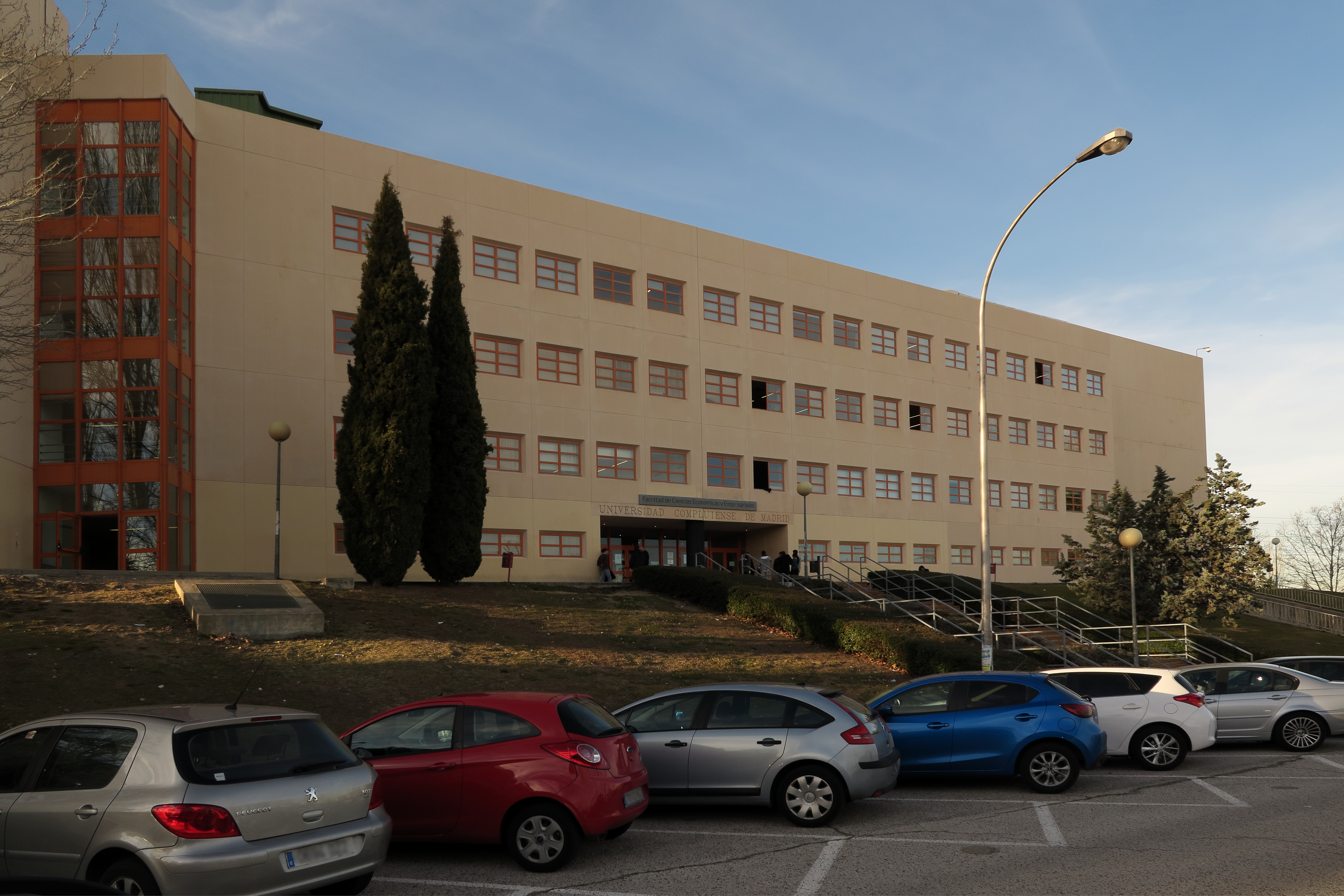
The UCM Faculty of Economics and Businesses

The educative offer is quite wide in the area, with a big number of both private and charter schools. There is also a significant number of bilingual schools, with The American School of Madrid and the British Council amongst them. The Liceo Sorolla, Colegio Everest, Aquinas American School and Retamar School are also other schools located in Pozuelo de Alarcón.

Regarding university education, a secondary campus of the public Complutense University of Madrid (UCM), the Somosaguas Campus, comprising the faculties of Psychology, Economics and Businesses, Political Sciences, Sociology and Social Work, is located in Pozuelo de Alarcón.

The Francisco de Vitoria University (UFV), a private university run by the Legion of Christ, and the ESIC University, which is a business and marketing university, are also located in the municipality.

== People ==
The Hijo Adoptivo ("adopted son/daughter") honorary title, bestowed by the local government to standout people connected to the municipality but not born in it (as opposed to the equivalent Hijo Ilustre title, bestowed on standout people born in the municipality) has been granted to rally driver Carlos Sainz (2010).
