= List of Spain national rugby union players =

List of Spain national rugby union players is a list of people who have played for the Spain national rugby union team. The Spanish Rugby Federation counts the match between a Spanish XV and France XV in 1927 as the first official international.

== List ==
As of Caps as of 30 June 2021

No.	Name	Position	Caps	Debut opponent	Debut date
1	Bartolome Balsells Muntanes		1	v France XV at Madrid	26-May-1927
2	Félix Candela		3	v France XV at Madrid	26-May-1927
3	J. Cavillon		1	v France XV at Madrid	26-May-1927
4	Julio de la Pedraja y Barthe		2	v France XV at Madrid	26-May-1927
5	Enrique de Simon Sainz-Bois		4	v France XV at Madrid	26-May-1927
6	Ramón de Simon Sainz-Bois		1	v France XV at Madrid	26-May-1927
7	Faraudo		1	v France XV at Madrid	26-May-1927
8	Luis Ferreras Valle			v France XV at Madrid	26-May-1927
9	Jose M. Gancedo Guillen			v France XV at Madrid	26-May-1927
10	Jaime Juanes Roig			v France XV at Madrid	26-May-1927
11	Francisco Martinez Larranaga			v France XV at Madrid	26-May-1927
12	Juan Carlos Munoz Clement			v France XV at Madrid	26-May-1927
13	Cesar Palamino Carreno			v France XV at Madrid	26-May-1927
14	Fernando Sancho			v France XV at Madrid	26-May-1927
15	Francisco San Basilio			v France XV at Madrid	26-May-1927
16	Jose Aguilar Cortiella			v France XV at Bordeaux	8-Mar-1928
17	Domingo Aiximeno Moyano			v France XV at Bordeaux	8-Mar-1928
18	Rafael Artigas			v France XV at Bordeaux	8-Mar-1928
19	Jose Baides Facios			v France XV at Bordeaux	8-Mar-1928
20	Vicente Bisbal Climent			v France XV at Bordeaux	8-Mar-1928
21	Juan Blanquet Fondevilla			v France XV at Bordeaux	8-Mar-1928
22	Amadeo Blasco Yus			v France XV at Bordeaux	8-Mar-1928
23	Fernando Carreras Parset			v France XV at Bordeaux	8-Mar-1928
24	Jaime Garrigosa Julia			v France XV at Bordeaux	8-Mar-1928
25	Manuel Isart Subirach			v France XV at Bordeaux	8-Mar-1928
26	Rafael Rues			v France XV at Bordeaux	8-Mar-1928
27	Eduardo Ruiz Mendez			v France XV at Bordeaux	8-Mar-1928
28	Ricardo Vazquez Granjell			v France XV at Bordeaux	8-Mar-1928
29	Gabriel Deu Priu	Wing		v Italy at Barcelona	20-May 1929
30	Joaquin Fontanella Castro	Prop		v Italy at Barcelona	20-May 1929
31	Juan Massoni Sanz	Flanker		v Italy at Barcelona	20-May 1929
32	Antonio Nubials Cabestany	Prop		v Italy at Barcelona	20-May 1929
33	Francisco Sarda Gaspa	No. 8		v Italy at Barcelona	20-May 1929
34	Antonio Vilaspasa Arbos	Fullback		v Italy at Barcelona	20-May 1929
35	Pedro Fuste Quilez			v Germany at Barcelona	9-Jun-1929
36	Jaime Ros Unce			v Germany at Barcelona	9-Jun-1929
37	Fernando Sabras			v Germany at Barcelona	9-Jun-1929
38	Antonio Floch Gil			v Germany at Dresden	18-May-1930
39	Jose Masdefiol Montserrat			v Germany at Dresden	18-May-1930
40	Miguel Puigdeval Rieroch			v Germany at Dresden	18-May-1930
41	Anselmo Bori Fernandez	Wing		v Italy at Milan	29-May-1930
42	Gustavo Boix Lassaleta			v Morocco at Rabat	25-Dec-1931
43	Felix Bonilla			v Morocco at Rabat	25-Dec-1931
44	Gabriel Candela			v Morocco at Rabat	25-Dec-1931
45	Baudilio Ejias Milla			v Morocco at Rabat	25-Dec-1931
46	Carlos Garcia San Miguel			v Morocco at Rabat	25-Dec-1931
47	Josechu Guillen			v Morocco at Rabat	25-Dec-1931
48	Miguel Morayta			v Morocco at Rabat	25-Dec-1931
49	Julian Palacios Ucelay			v Morocco at Rabat	25-Dec-1931
50	Jaime Perez Lopez			v Morocco at Rabat	25-Dec-1931
51	Ramon Resines			v Morocco at Rabat	25-Dec-1931
52	Santiago Soler Garay			v Morocco at Rabat	25-Dec-1931
53	Jose Uncenta Basterrechea			v Morocco at Rabat	25-Dec-1931
54	Angel Audivert			v Portugal at Lisbon	13-Apr-1935
55	Luis Blanco Mongay			v Portugal at Lisbon	13-Apr-1935
56	Ernesto Cabeza			v Portugal at Lisbon	13-Apr-1935
57	Mariano Cruz			v Portugal at Lisbon	13-Apr-1935
58	Alejandro Delcaz Negro			v Portugal at Lisbon	13-Apr-1935
59	Carlos Duran Martinez			v Portugal at Lisbon	13-Apr-1935
60	Luis Fallola Garcia			v Portugal at Lisbon	13-Apr-1935
61	Rafael Garcia San Miguel			v Portugal at Lisbon	13-Apr-1935
62	Jesus Lopez Gomez			v Portugal at Lisbon	13-Apr-1935
63	Gonzalo Marin			v Portugal at Lisbon	13-Apr-1935
64	Alberto Perez Lopez			v Portugal at Lisbon	13-Apr-1935
65	Luis Español			v Portugal at Madrid	28-Mar-1936
66	Manuel Iglesias			v Portugal at Madrid	28-Mar-1936
67	Isabelino Melendez Riesgo			v Portugal at Madrid	28-Mar-1936
68	Carlos Puga			v Portugal at Madrid	28-Mar-1936
69	Antonio Altisench Puigmarti	Prop		v Italy at Roma	6-May-1951
70	Domingo Baeza Sanz	Flanker		v Italy at Roma	6-May-1951
71	Esteban Blanch Lazaro	Lock		v Italy at Roma	6-May-1951
72	Martin Corominas Domenech	Fullback		v Italy at Roma	6-May-1951
73	Miguel Angel de Luna	Centre		v Italy at Roma	6-May-1951
74	Luis Encabo Torres	Lock		v Italy at Roma	6-May-1951
75	Nicolas Fuster Conrado	Centre		v Italy at Roma	6-May-1951
76	Ricardo Fuster Conrado	Wing		v Italy at Roma	6-May-1951
77	Agustin Garcia Gomez	Flanker		v Italy at Roma	6-May-1951
78	Virgilio Hernandez Rivadulla	Prop		v Italy at Roma	6-May-1951
79	Francisco Morales Riesgo	Wing		v Italy at Roma	6-May-1951
80	Aureliano Moret Garcia Maurino	No. 8		v Italy at Roma	6-May-1951
81	Ramon Rabassa Munne	Scrum-half		v Italy at Roma	6-May-1951
82	Jorge Ribas Benavent	Flyhalf		v Italy at Roma	6-May-1951
83	Jose Rodo Moliner	Hooker		v Italy at Roma	6-May-1951
84	Juan A. Bernabe Cubillo	(Wing)		v Italy at Roma	6-May-1951
85	Gonzalo Algora Garcia	Prop		v Italy at Barcelona	13-Apr-1952
86	David Companon Revuelta	Flyhalf		v Italy at Barcelona	13-Apr-1952
87	Antonio Fite Rovira	Lock		v Italy at Barcelona	13-Apr-1952
88	Adolfo Macias Perez	Hooker		v Italy at Barcelona	13-Apr-1952
89	Juan Martet Guirado	Wing		v Italy at Barcelona	13-Apr-1952
90	Jose Martinez Serra	Prop		v Italy at Barcelona	13-Apr-1952
91	Marcelino Martin Alonso	Centre		v Italy at Barcelona	13-Apr-1952
92	Luis Merinero Dorronsoro	Lock		v Italy at Barcelona	13-Apr-1952
93	Rafael Zuazo Aguirre	Wing		v Italy at Barcelona	13-Apr-1952
94	Luis Izuzquiza Herranz			v West Germany at Madrid	28-Dec-1952
95	Jose Martinez Medina			v West Germany at Madrid	28-Dec-1952
96	Florencio Noriega Ruiz			v West Germany at Madrid	28-Dec-1952
97	Eusebio Pena Peropadre			v West Germany at Madrid	28-Dec-1952
98	Jose Maria Bassas Foncuberta			v West Germany at Frankfurt	21-Mar 1954
99	Alfredo Calzada Atienza			v West Germany at Frankfurt	21-Mar 1954
100	Miguel Figuls Bosch			v West Germany at Frankfurt	21-Mar 1954
101	Jorge Hernandez Bravo			v West Germany at Frankfurt	21-Mar 1954
102	Dionisio Hernandez Gil			v West Germany at Frankfurt	21-Mar 1954
103	Joaquin Massa Arenas			v West Germany at Frankfurt	21-Mar 1954
104	Alberto Nerecan Valerdi			v West Germany at Frankfurt	21-Mar 1954
105	Jose Luis Rivas Trechuelo			v West Germany at Frankfurt	21-Mar 1954
106	Juan Aleu Pujol			v Portugal at Madrid	5-Apr-1954
107	Nicolas Arganza Garcia			v Portugal at Madrid	5-Apr-1954
108	Pedro Carrillo Martin			v Portugal at Madrid	5-Apr-1954
109	Enrique Garcia Herreros			v Portugal at Madrid	5-Apr-1954
110	Javier Cortazar Cano			v Belgium at TV	11-Apr 1954
111	Jaime Olle Serra			v Belgium at TV	11-Apr 1954
112	Alberto Serena Facerias			v Belgium at TV	11-Apr 1954
113	Adrian Rodo Bellver	Hooker		v Italy at Naples	19-Apr-1954
114	Luis Abad Julian			v France XV at Limoges	25-Apr-1955
115	Ramon Juan Lizana Fiol			v France XV at Limoges	25-Apr-1955
116	Julio Merono Martinez			v France XV at Limoges	25-Apr-1955
117	Jose Pascual Arnau			v France XV at Limoges	25-Apr-1955
118	Jeronimo Rios Garcia			v France XV at Limoges	25-Apr-1955
119	Jose Luis Tobar Gonzalez			v France XV at Limoges	25-Apr-1955
120	Eduardo Forgas del Rio	No. 8		v Italy at Barcelona	18-Jul-1955
121	Jorge Juan Cadellans	Flanker		v Italy at Barcelona	18-Jul-1955
122	Juan Rovira Llas	Flanker		v Italy at Barcelona	18-Jul-1955
123	Juan Freire Ruiz			v West Germany at Barcelona	1-Feb 1957
124	Francisco Gonzalez Villar			v West Germany at Barcelona	1-Feb 1957
125	Gabriel Moragas Moragas			v West Germany at Barcelona	1-Feb 1957
126	Alberto Oriol Bosch			v West Germany at Barcelona	1-Feb 1957
127	Adolfo Valls Carbonell			v West Germany at Barcelona	1-Feb 1957
128	Juan Balsells Olive			v Romania at Liege	1-May 1958
129	Jesus Mera Orbezogo			v Belgium at Charleroi	3-May-1958
130	Francisco Subira Rocamora			v Belgium at Charleroi	3-May-1958
131	Jose Fernando Martin Cinto			v Belgium at Brussels	19-Mar-1959
132	Antonio Franco Granado			v West Germany at Heidelberg	15-May-1959
133	Jose Guissinye Canadell			v Belgium at Madrid	17-Apr-1960
134	Jose Cano Perez Ayuela			v West Germany at Barcelona	24-Apr-1960
135	Emilio Cilleros Fernandez			v West Germany at Barcelona	24-Apr-1960
136	Juan Jose Iglesias Fuertes			v West Germany at Barcelona	24-Apr-1960
137	Miguel Martinez Perez			v West Germany at Barcelona	24-Apr-1960
138	Alberto Sacristan Dorronsoro			v West Germany at Barcelona	24-Apr-1960
139	Jose Antonio Sancha de Prada			v West Germany at Barcelona	24-Apr-1960
140	Luis Vazquez de Castro			v West Germany at Barcelona	24-Apr-1960
141	Manuel Adarraga Elizaran			v West Germany at Barcelona	15-Apr-1962
142	Rafael Castillejos Santiago			v West Germany at Barcelona	15-Apr-1962
143	Estanislao de la Quadra Salcedo			v West Germany at Barcelona	15-Apr-1962
144	Jose Garaulet Casse			v West Germany at Barcelona	15-Apr-1962
145	Ramon Garrigosa Sogas			v West Germany at Barcelona	15-Apr-1962
146	Juan Mari Puig			v West Germany at Barcelona	15-Apr-1962
147	Francisco Mascaro Melendres			v West Germany at Barcelona	15-Apr-1962
148	Joaquin Santa Eulalia Balana			v West Germany at Barcelona	15-Apr-1962
149	Enrique Barbero Bonastre			v Portugal at Lisbon	1-May 1965
150	Raimundo Bartra Colome			v Portugal at Lisbon	1-May 1965
151	Francisco Javie Bessa Bessa			v Portugal at Lisbon	1-May 1965
152	Francisco Claramunt Vidal			v Portugal at Lisbon	1-May 1965
153	Santiago de la Cuesta			v Portugal at Lisbon	1-May 1965
154	Roberto Imizcoz Lechuga			v Portugal at Lisbon	1-May 1965
155	Juan Jose Pinan Prieto			v Portugal at Lisbon	1-May 1965
156	Juan Pla Batalla			v Portugal at Lisbon	1-May 1965
157	Juan Recasens Cortina			v Portugal at Lisbon	1-May 1965
158	Santiago Rios Aregues			v Portugal at Lisbon	1-May 1965
159	Gabriel Rocabert Sanz			v Portugal at Lisbon	1-May 1965
160	Roman Sanchez Misiego			v Portugal at Lisbon	1-May 1965
161	Narciso Trull Ventura			v Portugal at Lisbon	1-May 1965
162	Francisco Barbadillo Gomez			v Portugal at Madrid	27-Mar-1966
163	Cesar de Leyva Sobrado			v Portugal at Madrid	27-Mar-1966
164	Armando Igelsias Dalmau			v Portugal at Madrid	27-Mar-1966
165	Juan Bautista Martinez Gemar			v Portugal at Madrid	27-Mar-1966
166	Jorge Martinez Picornell			v Portugal at Madrid	27-Mar-1966
167	Jaime Planes Solanes			v Portugal at Madrid	27-Mar-1966
168	Octavio Roses Contel			v Portugal at Madrid	27-Mar-1966
169	Francisco Sacristan Perez			v Portugal at Madrid	27-Mar-1966
170	Javier Chacon Oreja			v Portugal at Lisbon	26-Mar-1967
171	Jose Curiel Alonso			v Portugal at Lisbon	26-Mar-1967
172	Enrique Egea Ibanez			v Portugal at Lisbon	26-Mar-1967
173	Domingo Fernandez Calleja			v Portugal at Lisbon	26-Mar-1967
174	Fernando Gomez Reino Carnota			v Portugal at Lisbon	26-Mar-1967
175	Jose Gonzalez Genova			v Portugal at Lisbon	26-Mar-1967
176	Augusto Martínez González			v Portugal at Lisbon	26-Mar-1967
177	Jose Antonio Velez Rodriguez			v Portugal at Lisbon	26-Mar-1967
178	Manuel Lopez Acha			v Morocco at Madrid	9-Apr-1967
179	Andres Martinez Mahamut			v Morocco at Madrid	9-Apr-1967
180	Alvaro Sagnier Munoz			v Morocco at Madrid	9-Apr-1967
181	Luis Mocoroa		42	v Netherlands at Amsterdam	23-Apr-1967
182	Jorge Romero Dominguez			v Czechia at Madrid	5-May-1967
183	Jose Antonio Abecia Valencia			v Morocco at Casablanca	17-Mar-1968
184	Alfonso Alonso-Lasheras Rivero			v Morocco at Casablanca	17-Mar-1968
185	José Antonio Bueno			v Morocco at Casablanca	17-Mar-1968
186	Luis Pujol Galobart			v Morocco at Casablanca	17-Mar-1968
187	Jorge Matons Fabregat			v Portugal at Madrid	31-Mar 1968
188	Juan Bosco Vial			v Portugal at Barreiro	23-Mar-1969
189	Jose Antonio del Valle Urbieta			v Portugal at Barreiro	23-Mar-1969
190	Enrique Font Olivart			v Portugal at Barreiro	23-Mar-1969
191	Juan Antonio Irastorza Murtula			v Portugal at Barreiro	23-Mar-1969
192	Luis Matutano Subietas			v Portugal at Barreiro	23-Mar-1969
193	Antonio Mejias Solis			v Portugal at Barreiro	23-Mar-1969
194	Fernando Modrego Vitoria			v Portugal at Barreiro	23-Mar-1969
195	Carlos Ruiz Tormo			v Morocco at Madrid	13-Apr-1969
196	Julio Segurola Solaz			v Morocco at Madrid	13-Apr-1969
197	Ignacio Corujo Pita	Centre		v Italy at L'Aquila	4-May-1969
198	José del Rey Rodriguez	Centre		v Italy at L'Aquila	4-May-1969
199	Felipe del Valle Perea	Fullback		v Italy at L'Aquila	4-May-1969
200	José María Epalza	Flanker		v Italy at L'Aquila	4-May-1969
201	Miguel Camarero Ruiz			v Serbia & Montenegro at Madrid	21-Dec 1969
202	Ángel Luis Jiménez Sánchez			v Serbia & Montenegro at Madrid	21-Dec 1969
203	Vicente Picho Romani			v Serbia & Montenegro at Madrid	21-Dec 1969
204	Jorge Tosca Rovira			v Serbia & Montenegro at Madrid	21-Dec 1969
205	Jesús Gadea Sainz			v Poland at Poznan	26-Apr-1970
206	Luis Gimenez Guitard			v Morocco at Casablanca	10-May 1970
207	Juan Escoda Espinalt			v Portugal at Madrid	20-Dec 1970
208	Carlos Fernández Caicoya			v Portugal at Madrid	20-Dec 1970
209	Eduardo Fernández Gijón			v Portugal at Madrid	20-Dec 1970
210	Juan Francisco Santana Sinovas			v Portugal at Madrid	20-Dec 1970
211	Pablo Lazaro Ochaita			v Belgium at Brussels	18-Apr-1971
212	Jesús Linares			v Belgium at Brussels	18-Apr-1971
213	Juan Luque Medel			v Belgium at Brussels	18-Apr-1971
214	Carlos Luque Medel			v Czechia at Madrid	25-Apr-1971
215	Ignacio Berdugo Gomez de la Torre			v Serbia & Montenegro at Madrid	5-Dec-1971
216	Jose Manuel Cabezas Acosta			v Serbia & Montenegro at Madrid	5-Dec-1971
217	Francisco Casa Ros			v Serbia & Montenegro at Madrid	5-Dec-1971
218	Gabriel Zapiain Busto			v Serbia & Montenegro at Madrid	5-Dec-1971
219	Alfonso Feijoo			v Serbia & Montenegro at Split	30-Apr 1972
220	Francisco Javie Iraregui Murguiondo	Scrum-half		v Italy at Madrid	14-May-1972
221	Manolo Moriche	Flyhalf	59	v Italy at Madrid	14-May-1972
222	Carlos Rodriguez Garcia	Lock		v Italy at Madrid	14-May-1972
223	Pedro Calderon Rubiales	Fullback		v Italy at Ivrea	21-May 1972
224	Carlos Romero Moreno	Flanker		v Italy at Ivrea	21-May 1972
225	Jaime Usabiaga Zarranz	Hooker		v Italy at Ivrea	21-May 1972
226	Francisco Ignacio Garayeta Elcoro			v Poland at Madrid	8-Dec-1972
227	Jose Marugan Saenz			v Poland at Madrid	8-Dec-1972
228	Luis Armando Menéndez Menéndez			v Morocco at Casablanca	11-Mar 1973
229	Juan Forns Pi			v Romania at Constanta	14-Apr-1973
230	José Miguel Galdós			v France XV at Barcelona	3-Jun-1973
231	Adolfo García Planas			v France XV at Barcelona	3-Jun-1973
232	Hipólito Zabaleta Sarasua			v Morocco at Madrid	31-Mar 1974
233	Ignacio Álvarez Cienfuegos		29	v France XV at Monleon	2-Feb-1975
234	Luis Ramón Moneo Arzac			v France XV at Monleon	2-Feb-1975
235	Javier Olaciregui			v France XV at Monleon	2-Feb-1975
236	Juan Sabaté Clota			v France XV at Monleon	2-Feb-1975
237	Francisco Soler Calatrava			v France XV at Monleon	2-Feb-1975
238	Andrés Zulet Artegui			v France XV at Monleon	2-Feb-1975
239	Salvador Monleón Cremades	Wing		v Italy at Madrid	6-Apr-1975
240	Ramiro Moreno Martínez	Flyhalf		v Italy at Madrid	6-Apr-1975
241	Fernando Lopez Ipiña Mattern			v Netherlands at Amsterdam	7-Dec-1975
242	Luis Alfonso Paul			v Netherlands at Amsterdam	7-Dec-1975
243	José Alcántara Munoz	Prop		v Italy at Madrid	20-Dec 1975
244	José Luis Ruiz Cristín	Wing		v Italy at Madrid	20-Dec 1975
245	Salvador Torres	Centre	60	v Italy at Madrid	20-Dec 1975
246	Guillermo Blanco de Gregorio			v France XV at Madrid	28-Feb-1976
247	Manuel Coloma Lamigueiro			v France XV at Madrid	28-Feb-1976
248	Francisco Flores Fraile			v France XV at Madrid	28-Feb-1976
249	Javier Goicochea Tabar			v France XV at Madrid	28-Feb-1976
250	Antonio Martín Sánchez			v France XV at Madrid	28-Feb-1976
251	Mikel Mungia Fernandez			v France XV at Madrid	28-Feb-1976
252	Tomás Pardo			v France XV at Madrid	28-Feb-1976
253	Jose Ramon Apraiz Feliu			v Romania at Bucharest	2-May-1976
254	Hilario Bonavida Estupiña			v Romania at Bucharest	2-May-1976
255	Miguel Ángel Ribera Virtus			v Romania at Bucharest	2-May-1976
256	Santiago Noriega Bastos			v Poland at Bailytok	15-May-1976
257	Alberto Errandonea Uzurrunzaga	Lock		v Italy at Rome	27-Nov-1976
257	Francisco Bueno Cabeza	Wing		v Italy at Rome	27-Nov-1976
258	José Francisco Lorenzo Berberana	Fullback		v Italy at Rome	27-Nov-1976
259	Carlos Roca	Flanker		v Italy at Rome	27-Nov-1976
260	Joaquín Uría	(Lock)	10	v Italy at Rome	27-Nov-1976
261	Fernando García de la Torre			v France XV at Hendaye	5-Dec-1976
262	Javier Camiña	(Flanker)	13	v Italy at Madrid	17-Dec-1977
263	Juan Antonio Cano Hernández			v France XV at Madrid	29-Jan-1978
264	Luis Ángel Iraregui Murguiondo			v France XV at Madrid	29-Jan-1978
265	Rafael Canosa			v Romania at Bucharest	16-Apr-1978
266	Jose Manuel González Lozano			v Romania at Bucharest	16-Apr-1978
267	Francisco Plazas Poyuelo			v Romania at Bucharest	16-Apr-1978
268	Jesús Bengoechea Vilumbrales			v Poland at Warsaw	21-May 1978
269	Fernando Manero Zabala			v Poland at Warsaw	21-May 1978
270	Felipe Blanco			v Poland at Barcelona	26-Nov-1978
271	Brendan Bordons O'Mogan			v Poland at Barcelona	26-Nov-1978
272	Francisco Godas Bastida			v Poland at Barcelona	26-Nov-1978
273	Carlos Reguero Fuertes	No. 8		v Italy at Treviso	17-Dec-1978
274	Juan Francisco Neira Vazquez	(Flanker)		v Italy at Treviso	17-Dec-1978
275	José Luis Benito Urraburu			v France XV at Oloron	4-Mar-1979
276	Julio Jiménez Gómez			v France XV at Oloron	4-Mar-1979
277	Jesus Marquez Tallon			v Romania at Madrid	29-Apr-1979
278	Juan Homs Leyes			v Soviet Union at Moscow	20-May 1979
279	Juan F. Munguia Onraita			v Morocco at Split	16-Sep-1979
280	José Tormo		26	v Netherlands at Barcelona	28-Apr-1980
281	Francisco Javier Baiget Viale			v Sweden at Uppsala	9-Jun-1980
282	Santiago Santos		45	v Sweden at Uppsala	9-Jun-1980
283	Antonio Machuca	Prop	18	v Poland at Madrid	16-Nov-1980
284	Enrique Lobo	Flanker		v Italy at Madrid	21-Dec 1980
285	Sergio Loughney			v Romania at Barcelona	26-Apr-1981
286	José Antonio Egido			v Netherlands at Barcelona	7-Mar-1982
287	Ramón Nuche			v Netherlands at Barcelona	7-Mar-1982
288	Gabriel Rivero Macia			v Netherlands at Barcelona	7-Mar-1982
289	José Carlos de la Macorra			v Portugal at Lisbon	28-Mar-1982
290	José Luis Cruz López			v Poland at Lublin	8-Nov-1982
291	Carlos Encabo	Scrum-half		v NZ Maori at Madrid	20-Nov 1982
292	Ángel García Guerrero	Lock		v NZ Maori at Madrid	20-Nov 1982
293	Francisco Méndez Ureña	Lock		v NZ Maori at Madrid	20-Nov 1982
294	Carlos Oteo	Centre	5	v NZ Maori at Madrid	20-Nov 1982
295	Jon Azkargorta	Wing		v Argentina at Madrid	23-Nov-1982
296	Ramón Blanco Duelo	Flanker		v Argentina at Madrid	23-Nov-1982
297	Luis Núñez Doval	Flyhalf		v Argentina at Madrid	23-Nov-1982
298	Javier Amunarriz Pagadizabal		20	v Netherlands at Hilversum	13-Mar-1983
299	José Bergel Gonzalez			v Portugal at Madrid	26-Mar-1983
300	Javier Díaz Paternain	scrum-half	59	v Poland at Valence d'Agen	24-Apr-1983
301	Julio Álvarez	Prop	75	v Sweden at Arstad	8-May-1983
302	Telmo Fernández Castro			v Sweden at Arstad	8-May-1983
303	Ricardo Sainz de la Cuesta			v Wales at Madrid	29-May-1983
304	Javier Chocarro Huesa			v Zimbabwe at Madrid	3-Sep-1983
305	Mikel Elizalde Juantorena			v Zimbabwe at Madrid	3-Sep-1983
306	Jorge Garcia del Moral Bezten			v Zimbabwe at Madrid	3-Sep-1983
307	Pablo García Menéndez			v Zimbabwe at Madrid	3-Sep-1983
308	Luis Fernando Martín Fernández			v Zimbabwe at Madrid	3-Sep-1983
309	Ignacio Sese Espadas			v Zimbabwe at Madrid	3-Sep-1983
310	Isidro Oller Rodriguez			v France XV at Casablanca	10-Sep 1983
311	José Salazar Peñalba			v France XV at Casablanca	10-Sep 1983
312	Eduardo González Arbas			v Portugal at Lisbon	11-Mar 1984
313	Francisco Puertas		93	v Portugal at Lisbon	11-Mar 1984
314	Carlos Puigbert Ribes			v Belgium at Valladolid	22-Mar-1984
315	Xavier Alducin Gastesi			v Denmark at Copenhagen	28-Apr-1984
316	Jorge Moreno de Alborán			v Denmark at Copenhagen	28-Apr-1984
317	Bosco Abascal		23	v Zimbabwe at Bulawayo	7-Jul-1984
318	Javier Palacios Santaella			v Zimbabwe at Bulawayo	7-Jul-1984
319	Francisco Javier Puyuelo Ossorio			v Zimbabwe at Bulawayo	7-Jul-1984
320	Ignacio Zabala Irizar			v Romania at Madrid	16-Dec-1984
321	Javier Torres Morote	Wing		v France XV at Saint-Gaudens	17-Feb-1985
322	Rafael Álvarez Cienfuegos	Lock		v Wales B at Bridgend	19-Apr-1985
323	José Isasa Fernandez	Wing		v Wales B at Bridgend	19-Apr-1985
324	Jaime Auree Barrutia	(Wing)		v Wales B at Bridgend	19-Apr-1985
325	Alberto Malo		74	v Poland at Sopot	27-Oct-1985
326	Joaquin Rodriguez Garcia			v West Germany at Hanover	10-Nov 1985
327	Jordi Cubells Agramunt	Wing		v Scotland XV at Barcelona	1-May 1986
328	Héctor Massoni Terre	Flanker		v Scotland XV at Barcelona	1-May 1986
329	Arturo Trenzano Guillén			v West Germany at Madrid	29-Nov-1986
330	Enrique Uzquiano Lafleur			v West Germany at Madrid	29-Nov-1986
331	José Luis Moral Iglesias	Prop		v Scotland XV at Murrayfield	19-Apr-1987
332	José Roig Perez	Flanker		v Scotland XV at Murrayfield	19-Apr-1987
333	Marco Justiniano Marquez			v Uruguay at Montevideo	2-Aug-1987
334	Juan Toledo Guillen			v Uruguay at Montevideo	2-Aug-1987
335	Miguel Escoda Martí	Wing		v Argentina at Mar del Plata	17-Aug-1987
336	Javier Aguilar Cayetano	(Hooker)	31	v Argentina at Mar del Plata	17-Aug-1987
337	Pablo Amunarriz Aranguren	(Lock)	14	v Argentina at Mar del Plata	17-Aug-1987
338	Aitor Gorrotxategui Fernandez	Scrum-half		v Italy at Barcelona	5-Dec-1987
339	Claudio Díaz Lavilla	(Wing)		v England B at London	18-Mar-1988
340	Alejandro Ruiz de Eguinoa			v Soviet Union at Kutaisi	23-Apr-1988
341	Jaime Gutiérrez Merelles	(Replacement)		v France XV at Madrid	15-May-1988
342	Emilio Illaregui Etxabe			v NZ Maori at Seville	5-Nov-1988
343	Asier Altuna	Prop	33	v France XV at Hendaye	19-Mar-1989
344	Daniel Saenz Lobsack	(Centre)		v France XV at Hendaye	19-Mar-1989
345	José Díaz	Scrum-half		v England B at Madrid	14-May-1989
346	Fernando Tejada Chacón	Flyhalf		v England B at Madrid	14-May-1989
347	José Pablo Antona Navas			v Romania at Valence d'Agen	21-May 1989
348	Ricardo Castro Wagner			v Romania at Valence d'Agen	21-May 1989
349	Fidel Castro Briones	Lock		v Italy at L'Aquila	2-Jun-1989
350	Jordi Buch Prusa	(Wing)		v Italy at L'Aquila	2-Jun-1989
351	Ignacio Gómez-Trenor Garcia del Mor			v Zimbabwe at Bulawayo	8-Jul-1989
352	Joan Lluis Ros			v Poland at Madrid	1-Nov 1989
353	José Candau Pérez			v West Germany at Madrid	18-Mar-1990
354	Carlos Camarero Gutierrez	Flyhalf		v Ireland Under-25s at Limerick	8-Sep 1990
355	Jonadab Diez	Prop		v Ireland Under-25s at Limerick	8-Sep 1990
356	Jon Etxeberria	Flanker		v Romania at Padova	3-Oct-1990
357	Juan Mazariegos Luelmo	Scrum-half		v Romania at Padova	3-Oct-1990
358	Javier Gutierrez Villanueva	Flanker		v Netherlands at Rovigo	7-Oct-1990
359	Ignacio del Canto Banos	Lock		v Emerging Wallabies at Madrid	25-Nov-1990
360	José Ramón Pérez Blanco	Wing		v Emerging Wallabies at Madrid	25-Nov-1990
361	Ernesto Candau Pérez	Flyhalf		v Scotland A at Seville	22-Dec-1990
362	Carlos García Alcázar	Wing		v England B at Gloucester	20-Jan 1991
363	Miguel Sánchez González-Bermudo	Flyhalf		v England B at Gloucester	20-Jan 1991
364	Iñaki Laskurain	(Lock)		v France XV at Madrid	28-Apr-1991
365	Carlos Moreno de la Viuda	Wing		v Soviet Union at Moscow	11-May 1991
366	David Llorca Gasso	(Wing)		v Soviet Union at Moscow	11-May 1991
367	Pablo Gutierrez Merelles	Wing		v Soviet Union at Sevilla	17-Nov-1991
368	Jerónimo Hernández-Gi	Scrum-half		v Soviet Union at Sevilla	17-Nov-1991
369	Jesus Ruiz de Mendoza	Wing		v Soviet Union at Sevilla	17-Nov-1991
370	Alejandro Mino Terrancle	(Wing)		v Soviet Union at Sevilla	17-Nov-1991
371	Onesimo Garcia Ferre	Fullback		v Scotland A at Murrayfield	28-Dec-1991
372	Angel Gonzalez Gutierrez	Lock		v Scotland A at Murrayfield	28-Dec-1991
373	Mario Auzmendi Ripoll	Lock		v Italy at Madrid	9-Feb-1992
374	Eduardo Cecilia Simon	Wing		v Italy at Madrid	9-Feb-1992
375	Alejandro Esteve Herrera	Lock		v France XV at Perpignan	22-Mar-1992
376	Juan Pablo Martin Illanes	Wing		v France XV at Perpignan	22-Mar-1992
377	Pablo Calderon Sole	(Scrum-half)		v France XV at Perpignan	22-Mar-1992
378	Luis M. Petricorena Arbelaiz	Lock		v Romania at Madrid	4-Apr-1992
379	Jose Angel Hermosilla Olmos	(Fullback)		v Romania at Madrid	4-Apr-1992
380	Unai Aurrekoetxea Arregui	Centre		v Argentina at Buenos Aires	26-Sep-1992
381	Fernando de la Calle	Hooker	52	v Argentina at Madrid	24-Oct-1992
382	Ignacio Servan Garcia	Lock		v Argentina at Madrid	24-Oct-1992
383	Jordi Camps	Prop		v Tunisia at Tunis	30-Jan 1993
384	Victoriano Esnaola Torres	Lock		v England A at Richmond	5-Mar-1993
385	Jorge Gutierrez Sanz	Prop		v England A at Richmond	5-Mar-1993
386	Roberto Lizarza Mendizabal	Prop		v England A at Richmond	5-Mar-1993
387	Aitor Beloki Munguia	(Flanker)		v England A at Richmond	5-Mar-1993
388	Álvar Enciso	Centre	70	v Switzerland at Lisbon	11-May 1993
389	Marc Ventura Miranda	Wing		v Switzerland at Lisbon	11-May 1993
390	Oskar Solano Sevilla	(Lock)		v Switzerland at Lisbon	11-May 1993
391	Oliver Vaquero Sarramian	(Fullback)		v Switzerland at Lisbon	11-May 1993
392	José Ignacio Zapatero	Prop		v Italy at Perpignan	21-Jun 1993
393	José Prieto Acevedo	Hooker		v France XV at Narbonne	23-Jun-1993
394	José Miguel Villaú	Lock		v Morocco at Toulouse	28-Nov-1993
395	Roque Robles Perez	(Wing)		v Emerging England at Elche	6-Feb-1994
396	Ignacio de Lazaro Bravo	Prop		v France XV at Sarlat	20-Mar 1994
397	Alejandro Ruggero	Centre		v Russia at Madrid	10-Apr 1994
398	Marcelo Mascaro Casaccio	Prop		v Romania at Zaragoza	24-Apr-1994
399	Juan Manuel Pérez Escobar	Lock		v Romania at Zaragoza	24-Apr-1994
400	Javier Lopez Martin	No. 8		v Italy at Parma	7-May-1994
401	Alberto Socías	(Centre)		v Italy at Parma	7-May-1994
402	Saul Espina Limones	(Prop)		v Wales at Madrid	21-May 1994
403	Francisco Javie Fernandez Jimenez	Centre		v Germany at Hanover	13-Nov-1994
404	Xabier Guerediaga Nanclares	Flyhalf		v Morocco at El Puerto de Santa Maria	26-Mar-1995
405	Jorge Torres Morote	(Scrum-half)		v Scotland XV at Madrid	6-May-1995
406	Alexander Chamalo	No. 8		v Chile at Santiago	26-Aug-1995
407	Andriy Kovalenco	Flyhalf		v Chile at Santiago	26-Aug-1995
408	Pedro Monzon Pineiro	Flanker		v Chile at Santiago	26-Aug-1995
409	Daniel Rubio Avila	Lock		v Chile at Santiago	26-Aug-1995
410	Ferran Velazco Querol	Fullback		v Chile at Santiago	26-Aug-1995
411	Urko Manzano Basabe	(Flanker)		v Chile at Santiago	26-Aug-1995
412	Jose Ignacio Martinez Foronda	(Flanker)		v Chile at Santiago	26-Aug-1995
413	Carlos Fernandez Mayoral	Prop		v Uruguay at Montevideo	2-Sep-1995
414	Fernando Díez	(Flyhalf)		v Uruguay at Montevideo	2-Sep-1995
415	Miguel Serres Gutierrez	(Flanker)		v Uruguay at Montevideo	2-Sep-1995
416	Alvaro Miranda Hernandez	Flanker		v Morocco at Casablanca	16-Mar-1996
417	Víctor Torres	Prop		v Morocco at Casablanca	16-Mar-1996
418	Steve Tuineau Iloa	Lock		v Morocco at Casablanca	16-Mar-1996
419	Victor Aranda Diaz	(Wing)		v Morocco at Casablanca	16-Mar-1996
420	Felipe Tayeb	Centre		v France XV at Sant Boi de Llobregat	31-Mar 1996
421	Diego Fuks Mitelmann	(Lock)		v France XV at Sant Boi de Llobregat	31-Mar 1996
422	Aratz Gallastegui	Scrum-half		v Russia at Madrid	14-Apr-1996
423	Carlos Souto	Lock	50	v Russia at Madrid	14-Apr-1996
424	Oriol Ripol	Wing		v Portugal at Madrid	10-Nov 1996
425	José Ignacio Inchausti	(Fullback)		v Portugal at Madrid	10-Nov 1996
426	Aitor Etxeberría	(Flyhalf)		v Belgium at Madrid	8-Dec-1996
427	Raphaël Bastide	Fullback		v Andorra at Andorra la Vella	8-Nov-1997
428	Gorka Bueno Aramburu	Flyhalf		v Andorra at Andorra la Vella	8-Nov-1997
429	Daniel Garcia del Prado	Wing		v Andorra at Andorra la Vella	8-Nov-1997
430	Nacho Vargas Araujo	Wing		v Andorra at Andorra la Vella	8-Nov-1997
431	Tobias Cagigal de Gregorio	(Hooker)		v Andorra at Andorra la Vella	8-Nov-1997
432	Agustín Malet	(Back-row)		v Andorra at Andorra la Vella	8-Nov-1997
433	Antonio Socías	Wing		v Russia at Sevilla	15-Mar-1998
434	Miguel Ángel Frechilla	(Fullback)		v Russia at Sevilla	15-Mar-1998
435	Luis Javier Martínez	(Prop)		v Russia at Sevilla	15-Mar-1998
436	Diego Zarzosa	Hooker		v Russia at Sevilla	15-Mar-1998
437	Oskar Astarloa	(Flanker)	23	v USA at El Puerto de Santa Maria	12-Apr-1998
438	Cesar Hernandez Abad	(Flanker)		v USA at El Puerto de Santa Maria	12-Apr-1998
439	Rafael Ortega Lampaya	(Prop)		v USA at El Puerto de Santa Maria	12-Apr-1998
440	Alfonso Mata	No. 8	50	v Portugal at Murrayfield	2-Dec-1998
441	Jaime Alonso	Scrum-half		v Chile at Santiago	24-Jul-1999
442	Sergio Souto	Lock	51	v Chile at Santiago	24-Jul-1999
443	Sébastien Loubsens	Centre		v Japan at Tokyo	20-Aug 1999
444	Borja Jimenez Goni	Prop		v Fiji at Avezzano	24-Aug-1999
445	Daniel Ripol Fortuny	Wing		v Fiji at Avezzano	24-Aug-1999
446	Carlos Benito del Valle	Lock		v Netherlands at Mallorca	6-Feb-2000
447	Asis Garcia Mazariegos	Flanker		v Netherlands at Mallorca	6-Feb-2000
448	Antonio Leon Justel	Flanker		v Netherlands at Mallorca	6-Feb-2000
449	Javier Salazar Lizarraga	Prop	59	v Netherlands at Mallorca	6-Feb-2000
450	Miguel Abril Aparicio	(Lock)	21	v Netherlands at Mallorca	6-Feb-2000
451	Alfons Martinez Torres	(Flyhalf)		v Netherlands at Mallorca	6-Feb-2000
452	Antonio Ortega Lampaya	(Prop)		v Netherlands at Mallorca	6-Feb-2000
453	Marco Garcia Kristenson	(Flanker)		v Georgia at Madrid	4-Mar-2000
454	Javier Izquierdo de las Heras	(Lock)		v Georgia at Madrid	4-Mar-2000
455	Gabriel Martin Minguez	(Wing)		v Georgia at Madrid	4-Mar-2000
456	Tomas Judez Terres	(Scrum-half)		v Romania at Bucharest	19-Mar-2000
457	Eusebio Quevedo Yepes	Scrum-half		v Morocco at Albacete	2-Apr-2000
458	Carlos Jimenez Yela	(Hooker)		v Morocco at Albacete	2-Apr-2000
459	Francisco Javie Mahamud Vaquero	(Wing)		v Morocco at Albacete	2-Apr-2000
460	Jose Maria Bohorquez Gomez Millan	Hooker		v Russia at Madrid	4-Feb-2001
461	Roger Ripol Fortuny	(Hooker)		v Russia at Madrid	4-Feb-2001
462	Valentin Trillo Martinez	(Lock)		v Russia at Madrid	4-Feb-2001
463	Abraham Fortet Pastor	(Prop)		v Portugal at Madrid	4-Mar-2001
464	Noe Macias Gimeno	(Fullback)		v Uruguay at Montevideo	1-Sep 2001
465	Jorge de Urquiza	(Scrum-half)		v Australia at Madrid	1-Nov 2001
466	Antonio Beltran Rodriguez	(Scrum-half)		v South Africa at Sevilla	25-Nov-2001
467	Marcos Mella Fogo	(Prop)		v South Africa at Sevilla	25-Nov-2001
468	Calixt Vallve Ripol	(Flanker)		v South Africa at Sevilla	25-Nov-2001
469	Ivan Criado Garachana	Flanker	52	v Romania at Constanta	17-Feb-2002
470	Pablo Feijoo	(Scrum-half)		v Romania at Constanta	17-Feb-2002
471	Jaime Nava	(Centre)	79	v Netherlands at Murcia	6-Apr-2002
472	Agustín Magadan Fernandez	No. 8		v Poland at Gdynia	4-May-2002
473	Javier Castano	No. 8		v Italy at Valladolid	22-Sep-2002
474	Ramiro Garcia Salazar	Flanker		v Italy at Valladolid	22-Sep-2002
475	David Martin Cifuentes	Wing		v Italy at Valladolid	22-Sep-2002
476	David Monreal	Hooker		v Italy at Valladolid	22-Sep-2002
477	Jesus Bedmar Rodriguez	(Wing)		v Italy at Valladolid	22-Sep-2002
478	Victor Barrio Gonzalez	Fullback		v Romania at Iasi	5-Oct-2002
479	Manuel Cascarra	Centre		v Romania at Iasi	5-Oct-2002
480	Luis de la Maza Borrego	(Flanker)		v Romania at Iasi	5-Oct-2002
481	Pablo Sanchez Garcia	(Wing)		v Romania at Iasi	5-Oct-2002
482	Antonio Lobo Magallanes	Centre		v Russia at Madrid	27-Oct-2002
483	Dario Bernal Zuniga	(Wing)		v Russia at Madrid	27-Oct-2002
484	Ignacio de la Maza Borrego	(Lock)		v Russia at Madrid	27-Oct-2002
485	Leandro Fernández-Aramburu Rodrígez	(Lock)		v Russia at Madrid	27-Oct-2002
486	Daniel Nunez Cubas	(Prop)		v Russia at Madrid	27-Oct-2002
487	Jorge Prieto Solis	(Fullback)		v Russia at Madrid	27-Oct-2002
488	Juan Gonzalez Goicoechea	(Flanker)		v Russia at Krasnodar	24-Nov-2002
489	Fernando Alonso Valero	(Scrum-half)		v Romania at Madrid	9-Mar-2003
490	Carlos Dorval Martos	Prop		v Tunisia at Valence d'Agen	15-Mar-2003
491	Manuel Sierra	Lock		v USA at Fort Lauderdale	27-Apr-2003
492	Javier Canosa Schack	(Centre)		v USA at Fort Lauderdale	27-Apr-2003
493	Alexis Fernandez Dorado	(Hooker)		v USA at Fort Lauderdale	27-Apr-2003
494	Francis Alvarez	Wing		v Russia at Krasnodar	14-Feb-2004
495	Cesar Caballero San Jose	Prop		v Russia at Krasnodar	14-Feb-2004
496	Rafael Camacho Bilbao	Flanker		v Russia at Krasnodar	14-Feb-2004
497	Pedro José Dávila Sánchez	Lock		v Russia at Krasnodar	14-Feb-2004
498	Cédric Garcia	Centre		v Russia at Krasnodar	14-Feb-2004
499	Iker Lopategi Eguia	Flanker		v Russia at Krasnodar	14-Feb-2004
500	Francisco Lopez Martin	No. 8		v Russia at Krasnodar	14-Feb-2004
501	Ignacio Martin Goenaga	Centre		v Russia at Krasnodar	14-Feb-2004
502	Benjamin Pardo Garcha	Wing		v Russia at Krasnodar	14-Feb-2004
503	Manuel Serrano Fernandez-Paris	Prop		v Russia at Krasnodar	14-Feb-2004
504	Jose Luis Campillay Cano	(Flanker)		v Russia at Krasnodar	14-Feb-2004
505	Victor Marlet	(Fullback)		v Russia at Krasnodar	14-Feb-2004
506	Igor Mirones Truan	(Scrum-half)		v Georgia at Tarragona	22-Feb-2004
507	Jose Revilla Blanco	Centre		v Romania at Bucharest	6-Mar-2004
508	Julien Castello	Wing		v Hungary at Madrid	20-Nov 2004
509	Mathieu Cidre Baroni	Hooker		v Hungary at Madrid	20-Nov 2004
510	Igor Isasi Alzola	Lock		v Hungary at Madrid	20-Nov 2004
511	Vicent Lazaro Alcaide	Prop		v Hungary at Madrid	20-Nov 2004
512	Esteban Roque Segovia	Flyhalf		v Hungary at Madrid	20-Nov 2004
513	César Sempere	Fullback	56	v Hungary at Madrid	20-Nov 2004
514	Igor de la Sota Chalbaud	(Wing)		v Hungary at Madrid	20-Nov 2004
515	Facundo Lavino Zona	(Scrum-half)		v Hungary at Madrid	20-Nov 2004
516	David Mota	(Centre)		v Hungary at Madrid	20-Nov 2004
517	Leonardo Pereira Soler	(Flanker)		v Hungary at Madrid	20-Nov 2004
518	Nicolas Tisane Sendra	(Flanker)		v Hungary at Madrid	20-Nov 2004
519	Igor Alberro Lasa	Prop		v France Amateur at Madrid	5-Feb-2005
520	Andrew Ebbet	Lock		v France Amateur at Madrid	5-Feb-2005
521	Antoine Lagares	(Scrum-half)		v France Amateur at Madrid	5-Feb-2005
522	Olivier Loup	(Wing)		v France Amateur at Madrid	5-Feb-2005
523	Santiago Serrano Ledo	(Lock)		v Andorra at Andorra la Vella	13-Feb-2005
524	David Hernandez Abad	No. 8		v Croatia at Sevilla	10-Apr 2005
525	Cesar Bernasconi Rivera	Lock		v Japan at Tokyo	5-Nov-2005
526	Ion Insausti	Prop		v Japan at Tokyo	5-Nov-2005
527	Alvaro Lazaro Gaminde	(Flanker)		v Japan at Tokyo	5-Nov-2005
528	Alejandro Ortega Cruz	(N8)		v Japan at Tokyo	5-Nov-2005
529	Guillermo Barcena Perotas	Lock		v Poland at Madrid	13-Nov-2005
530	Carlos Arenas Muniz	(Scrum-half)		v Andorra at Andorra la Vella	11-Mar 2006
531	Alex Onega Camacho	(Prop)		v Andorra at Andorra la Vella	11-Mar 2006
532	Pedro Martín	(Fullback)		v Netherlands at Madrid	29-Apr-2006
533	Sergio Padrisa Vinegia	Prop		v Germany at Heidelberg	13-May-2006
534	Cyril Hijar Barre	(Back-row)		v Germany at Heidelberg	13-May-2006
535	Miguel Burgaleta Perez-Prim	(Prop)		v Germany at Madrid	27-May-2006
536	Jean-Rafael Álvarez	Wing	16	v Wales Amateur at Liege	23-Aug-2006
537	Juan Cano Rodriguez-Arias	(Wing)		v Wales Amateur at Liege	23-Aug-2006
538	Mathieu Lopez	Scrum-half		v Belgium at Liege	26-Aug-2006
539	Tomas Salvador	Wing		v Belgium at Liege	26-Aug-2006
540	Luis Alfonso Cano Garcia	Prop		v France Amateur at Aire-sur-l'Adour	27-Jan-2007
541	Alastair Chambers	Flanker		v France Amateur at Aire-sur-l'Adour	27-Jan-2007
542	Manuel Mazo Canas	Centre		v France Amateur at Aire-sur-l'Adour	27-Jan-2007
543	Raúl Turrión Hernández	Centre		v France Amateur at Aire-sur-l'Adour	27-Jan-2007
544	Ignacio Gutiérrez Muller	(Flyhalf)		v France Amateur at Aire-sur-l'Adour	27-Jan-2007
545	Pablo Serrano Martinez	(Lock)		v France Amateur at Aire-sur-l'Adour	27-Jan-2007
546	Manuel Olivares Pont	Flyhalf		v Russia at Madrid	10-Feb 2007
547	Martin Acena Colaneri	(Back-row)		v Romania at Bucharest	10-Mar 2007
548	Oscar Ferreras Saura	(Prop)		v Romania at Bucharest	10-Mar 2007
549	Mathieu Gratton Cristol	Flyhalf		v Chile at Santiago	15-Aug-2007
550	Matthieu Lopez Bouchet	(Scrum-half)		v Chile at Santiago	15-Aug-2007
551	Julien Tourtoulou Castillon	(N8)		v Chile at Santiago	15-Aug-2007
552	Matías Tudela	Wing		v Russia at Krasnodar	8-Mar-2008
553	Fernando Dominguez Pinagua	(Wing)		v Russia at Krasnodar	8-Mar-2008
554	Gabriel Ligneres	(Hooker)		v Russia at Krasnodar	8-Mar-2008
555	Jesús Moreno	Prop	53	v Georgia at Tbilisi	26-Apr-2008
556	Juan Gonzalez Marruecos	(Flanker)		v Georgia at Tbilisi	26-Apr-2008
557	Jesus Recuerda Nunez	(Lock)		v Georgia at Tbilisi	26-Apr-2008
558	Damien Elgoyhen Sanchez	No. 8		v Russia at Moscow	8-Nov-2008
559	Marco Pinto Ferrer	(Hooker)		v Russia at Moscow	8-Nov-2008
560	Camile Riu	Flyhalf		v Germany at Madrid	15-Nov-2008
561	Sergio Guerrero Esteban	(Flanker)		v Germany at Madrid	15-Nov-2008
562	Sebastian Hattori	(Prop)		v Germany at Madrid	15-Nov-2008
563	Martin Jeremias Palumbo	Flyhalf		v Romania at Madrid	7-Feb-2009
564	Romain Roques	Lock		v Romania at Madrid	7-Feb-2009
565	Mickael Lopez Herrero	(Scrum-half)		v Portugal at Lisbon	15-Mar-2009
566	Martin Heredia Federico	Centre		v Russia at Madrid	13-Feb-2010
567	Matt Cook	(Flanker)		v Russia at Madrid	13-Feb-2010
568	David Gugernadze	(Prop)		v Russia at Madrid	13-Feb-2010
569	Victor Javier Acevedo	Prop		v Georgia at Tbilisi	27-Feb-2010
570	Ati Fernandez Riga	Scrum-half		v Georgia at Tbilisi	27-Feb-2010
571	Federico Negrillo Kovacevich	Flanker		v Georgia at Tbilisi	27-Feb-2010
572	Gautier Gibouin Fontana	(N8)		v Georgia at Tbilisi	27-Feb-2010
573	Anthony Pradalie Diaz	(Prop)		v Georgia at Tbilisi	27-Feb-2010
574	Marc Puigbert Velazco	(Scrum-half)		v Georgia at Tbilisi	27-Feb-2010
575	Hernan Quirelli	Scrum-half		v Romania at Bucharest	27-Mar-2010
576	Sale Ibarra Serrano	(Scrum-half)		v Romania at Bucharest	27-Mar-2010
577	Bruno Angulo	Centre		v Canada at Madrid	13-Nov-2010
578	Pierre Belzunce Cazaux	Wing		v Canada at Madrid	13-Nov-2010
579	Baptiste Hugo Sanchez Pontalay	Wing		v Canada at Madrid	13-Nov-2010
580	Diego Alvarez Gorosito	(Wing)		v Canada at Madrid	13-Nov-2010
581	Mattin Auzqui Etchepare	(Prop)		v Canada at Madrid	13-Nov-2010
582	David Barrera Howarth	(Lock)		v Canada at Madrid	13-Nov-2010
583	Sylvain Gonzalez Collet	(Hooker)		v Canada at Madrid	13-Nov-2010
584	Rodrigo Martinez Sanchez	(Prop)		v Canada at Madrid	13-Nov-2010
585	Sebastien Rouet Piffard	(Centre)		v Canada at Madrid	13-Nov-2010
586	Sergi Aubanell	Wing	21	v Namibia at Palma de Mallorca	27-Nov-2010
587	Benat Auzqui Etchepare	Hooker		v Namibia at Palma de Mallorca	27-Nov-2010
588	Mathieu Peluchon	Fullback		v Namibia at Palma de Mallorca	27-Nov-2010
589	Remi Delgado	(Wing)		v Namibia at Palma de Mallorca	27-Nov-2010
590	Victor Gomez Farto	(Flanker)		v Namibia at Palma de Mallorca	27-Nov-2010
591	Andoni Jorajuria Calavia	(Centre)		v Namibia at Palma de Mallorca	27-Nov-2010
592	Stephan Vitalla la Puassotte	(Lock)		v Namibia at Palma de Mallorca	27-Nov-2010
593	Adrien Ayestaran Jannot	Scrum-half		v Russia at Madrid	5-Feb-2011
594	Mathieu Amoros	(Flanker)		v Russia at Madrid	5-Feb-2011
595	Sylvain Antequera	(Flanker)		v Russia at Madrid	5-Feb-2011
596	Maxime Samson Echeverria	(N8)		v Russia at Madrid	5-Feb-2011
597	Mathieu Roca Ferrer	Flanker		v Georgia at Tbilisi	12-Feb-2011
598	Unai Lasa Arratibel	(Hooker)		v Georgia at Tbilisi	12-Feb-2011
599	Fabien Rofes	Hooker		v Ukraine at Madrid	26-Feb-2011
600	Carlos Blanco Smith	Centre		v Portugal at Madrid	12-Mar-2011
601	Brice Labadie	Wing		v Portugal at Madrid	12-Mar-2011
602	Anibal Fernando Bonan	(Lock)		v Romania at Bucharest	19-Mar-2011
603	Ramon Narvaez Jareno	(Centre)		v Romania at Bucharest	19-Mar-2011
604	Edu Sorribes Ramirez	(Wing)		v Romania at Bucharest	19-Mar-2011
605	Sébastien Ascarat	Wing	18	v Uruguay at Madrid	19-Nov-2011
606	Ryan Leroux	Wing		v Uruguay at Madrid	19-Nov-2011
607	Charly Malié	Flyhalf		v Uruguay at Madrid	19-Nov-2011
608	Tom Parker	Lock		v Uruguay at Madrid	19-Nov-2011
609	Glen Rolls	Flanker		v Uruguay at Madrid	19-Nov-2011
610	Mathieu Visensang	No. 8		v Uruguay at Madrid	19-Nov-2011
611	Pierre-Emmanuel Garcia	Centre		v Georgia at Madrid	11-Feb 2012
612	Craig Lyons	(Lock)		v Georgia at Madrid	11-Feb 2012
613	Jon Phipps	(Hooker)		v Georgia at Madrid	11-Feb 2012
614	Luciano Bettera	Flanker		v Ukraine at Alushta	25-Feb-2012
615	Joe Hutchinson	Prop		v Ukraine at Alushta	25-Feb-2012
616	Franck Labbe	Prop		v Ukraine at Alushta	25-Feb-2012
617	Nicholas Marshall	(Centre)		v Romania at Madrid	17-Mar-2012
618	Angel Lopez Vazquez	(Flyhalf)		v Russia at Moscow	19-May-2012
619	Victor Sanchez Borrego	(Lock)		v Russia at Moscow	19-May-2012
620	Juan Anaya Lazaro	Hooker		v Zimbabwe at Windhoek	14-Nov-2012
621	Alejandro Jesus Blanco Frade	Lock		v Zimbabwe at Windhoek	14-Nov-2012
622	Javi Carrion Llorens	Wing		v Zimbabwe at Windhoek	14-Nov-2012
623	Javier de Juan Roldan	Flanker		v Zimbabwe at Windhoek	14-Nov-2012
624	Oier Garmendia Eszpondal	Fullback		v Zimbabwe at Windhoek	14-Nov-2012
625	Jon Magunazelaia Pinaga	Flanker		v Zimbabwe at Windhoek	14-Nov-2012
626	Lionel Pardo Butina	No. 8		v Zimbabwe at Windhoek	14-Nov-2012
627	Corey Smith	Centre		v Zimbabwe at Windhoek	14-Nov-2012
628	Dani Marron Vaquero	(Hooker)		v Zimbabwe at Windhoek	14-Nov-2012
629	Jaike Carter	Centre		v Namibia at Windhoek	17-Nov-2012
630	Joan Tudela Perret	Flanker		v Namibia at Windhoek	17-Nov-2012
631	Gregory Maiquez	(Scrum-half)		v Russia at Sotchi	2-Feb-2013
632	Francisco Usero Barcena	(Flanker)		v Russia at Sotchi	2-Feb-2013
633	Julen Goia Iriberri	Wing		v Romania at Gijon	23-Feb-2013
634	Cory Simpson	Flyhalf		v Romania at Gijon	23-Feb-2013
635	Agustin Ortiz Crivelli	(Prop)		v Romania at Gijon	23-Feb-2013
636	Juan Pablo Ceretto	Scrum-half		v Georgia at Tbilisi	9-Mar-2013
637	Adam Newton	(Flanker)		v Portugal at Santiago de Compostela	16-Mar-2013
638	Ignacio Contardi Medina	Centre		v Chile at Santiago	9-Nov-2013
639	Marcos Poggi Ranwez	Wing		v Chile at Santiago	9-Nov-2013
640	Dan Snee	Flyhalf		v Chile at Santiago	9-Nov-2013
641	Igor Genua	(Replacement)		v Chile at Santiago	9-Nov-2013
642	Nil Baro Mestres	(Wing)		v Uruguay at Montevideo	16-Nov-2013
643	Inaki Villanueva Martin-Serrano	(Centre)		v Uruguay at Montevideo	16-Nov-2013
644	Mariano Garcia Mortigliengo	Flyhalf		v Japan at Madrid	23-Nov-2013
645	Xabier Garmendia	(Prop)		v Japan at Madrid	23-Nov-2013
646	Guillaume Rouet	(Scrum-half)		v Russia at Madrid	1-Feb 2014
647	Alvaro Nunez Llorente	(Lock)		v Belgium at Madrid	8-Feb-2014
648	Francisco Sanz Benlloch	Prop		v Romania at Cluj	22-Feb-2014
649	Javier Miranda Martin	(Prop)		v Romania at Cluj	22-Feb-2014
650	Alberto Diaz Camarero	Wing		v Georgia at Tbilisi	14-Jun-2014
651	Sergio Fernandez Gomez	Wing		v Georgia at Tbilisi	14-Jun-2014
652	Manuel Mora Ruiz	Flanker		v Georgia at Tbilisi	14-Jun-2014
653	Facundo Munilla lo Duca	Scrum-half		v Georgia at Tbilisi	14-Jun-2014
654	Romain Asensi	(Hooker)		v Georgia at Tbilisi	14-Jun-2014
655	Francisco Cloppet	(Fullback)		v Georgia at Tbilisi	14-Jun-2014
656	Jose Luis del Valle Gelineau	(N8)		v Georgia at Tbilisi	14-Jun-2014
657	Guillermo Espinos Gozalves	(Prop)		v Georgia at Tbilisi	14-Jun-2014
658	Pablo Fontes de Castro	(Wing)		v Georgia at Tbilisi	14-Jun-2014
659	Alejandro Gutierrez Muller	(Centre)		v Georgia at Tbilisi	14-Jun-2014
660	Ignacio Duco Molina Ohm	Lock		v Emerging Italy at Tbilisi	18-Jun-2014
661	Francisco Blanco Alonso	(Lock)		v Emerging Italy at Tbilisi	18-Jun-2014
662	David González	(Lock)		v Russia at Madrid	7-Feb-2015
663	Fernando López	(Prop)		v Russia at Madrid	7-Feb-2015
664	Brad Linklater	Fullback		v Georgia at Madrid	28-Feb-2015
665	Thibault Visensang	Centre		v Georgia at Madrid	28-Feb-2015
666	Gauthier Minguillon	Centre		v Portugal at Coimbra	14-Mar-2015
667	Federico Casteglioni Alzorriz	(Wing)		v Portugal at Coimbra	14-Mar-2015
668	Fabien Grammatico	Centre		v Germany at Madrid	21-Mar 2015
669	Thibaut Alvarez	Centre	20	v Romania at Bucharest	12-Jun-2015
670	Pierre García	Wing		v Romania at Bucharest	12-Jun-2015
671	Angel Durango	(Prop)		v Romania at Bucharest	12-Jun-2015
672	Marcos Puig	(Wing)		v Romania at Bucharest	12-Jun-2015
673	Antoine Sanchez	Wing		v Argentina A at Bucharest	17-Jun-2015
674	Tomas Urbaitis	Lock		v Argentina A at Bucharest	17-Jun-2015
675	Guillermo Mateu Spuches	(Wing)		v Kenya at Nairobi	18-Jul-2015
676	Jonathan García	Prop		v Chile at Torrelavega	21-Nov 2015
677	Xerom Civil	(Prop)		v Chile at Torrelavega	21-Nov-2015
678	Mathieu Bélie	Centre		v Russia at Sotchi	6-Feb-2016
679	Gareth Griffiths	(Flyhalf)		v Russia at Sotchi	6-Feb-2016
680	Pierre Barthere	Flanker		v Romania at Madrid	13-Feb-2016
681	Pablo Gil Sanchez	Scrum-half		v Georgia at Tbilisi	27-Feb-2016
682	Rafa de Santiago Olalquaig	(Wing)		v Georgia at Tbilisi	27-Feb-2016
683	Oier Goia Iriberri	(Lock)		v Georgia at Tbilisi	27-Feb-2016
684	Daniel Stöhr	(Prop)		v Georgia at Tbilisi	27-Feb-2016
685	Jaime Mata Sanchez	Flyhalf		v Argentina XV at Bucharest	9-Jun-2016
686	Florian Munoz Rivero	Flanker		v Argentina XV at Bucharest	9-Jun-2016
687	Asier Usarraga Latierro	Flanker		v Argentina XV at Bucharest	9-Jun-2016
688	Alvaro Abril Garcia	(Wing)		v Argentina XV at Bucharest	9-Jun-2016
689	Michael Dallery	(Hooker)		v Argentina XV at Bucharest	9-Jun-2016
690	Pablo Cesar Gutierrez Tobal	(Prop)		v Argentina XV at Bucharest	9-Jun-2016
691	Jordi Jorba Jorge	(Centre)		v Argentina XV at Bucharest	9-Jun-2016
692	Alberto Blanco Alonso	(Prop)		v Namibia at Bucharest	13-Jun-2016
693	Fabien Perrin	Centre		v Tonga at Madrid	12-Nov-2016
694	Matthew Foulds	(Lock)		v Tonga at Madrid	12-Nov-2016
695	Kalokalo Gavidi	(Flanker)		v Tonga at Madrid	12-Nov-2016
696	Álvar Gimeno	(Centre)		v Tonga at Madrid	12-Nov-2016
697	Juan Ramos Martín	Scrum-half		v Uruguay at Malaga	19-Nov-2016
698	Arturo Iniguez Velasco	(Wing)		v Uruguay at Malaga	19-Nov-2016
699	Steve Barnes	(Hooker)		v Romania at Iasi	18-Feb-2017
700	Lucas Guillaume	(Lock)		v Georgia at Medina del Campo	4-Mar-2017
701	Jon Zabala	(Prop)		v Georgia at Medina del Campo	4-Mar-2017
702	Jean-Baptiste Custoja	Prop		v Namibia at Montevideo	10-Jun 2017
703	Fred Quercy	Flanker		v Namibia at Montevideo	10-Jun 2017
704	Andrea Rabago	Centre		v Namibia at Montevideo	10-Jun 2017
705	Afa Tauli	(N8)		v Namibia at Montevideo	10-Jun 2017
706	Tomas Munilla lo Duca	Scrum-half		v Argentina XV at Montevideo	14-Jun-2017
707	Iñaki Mateu	Centre		v Argentina XV at Montevideo	14-Jun-2017
708	Emiliano Calle Rivas	(Centre)		v Argentina XV at Montevideo	14-Jun-2017
709	Joan Losada Gifra	(Wing)		v Canada at Madrid	18-Nov-2017
710	Bastien Fuster	(Flyhalf)		v Russia at Krasnodar	10-Feb-2018
711	Quentin García	Hooker		v Georgia at Tbilisi	3-Mar-2018
712	Josh Peters	Lock		v Georgia at Tbilisi	3-Mar-2018
713	Mickael de Marco	Lock		v Namibia at Madrid	17-Nov-2018
714	Lucas Levy	Fullback		v Namibia at Madrid	17-Nov-2018
715	Lucas Rubio	Scrum-half		v Namibia at Madrid	17-Nov-2018
716	Toby Francis	(Lock)		v Namibia at Madrid	17-Nov-2018
717	Richard Stewart	(Fullback)		v Namibia at Madrid	17-Nov-2018
718	Bittor Aboitiz	(Prop)		v Samoa at Madrid	24-Nov-2018
719	Vicente del Hoyo Portoles	(Hooker)		v Samoa at Madrid	24-Nov-2018
720	Michael Walker-Fitton	(Flanker)		v Samoa at Madrid	24-Nov-2018
721	Andrew Norton	Flyhalf		v Russia at Madrid	10-Feb-2019
722	Guillermo Dominguez Narciso	(Wing)		v Russia at Madrid	10-Feb-2019
723	Michael Hogg	(N8)		v Russia at Madrid	10-Feb-2019
724	Joaquin Manuel Dominguez	(Prop)		v Georgia at Tbilisi	17-Feb-2019
725	Hugo Alonso	(Wing)		v Romania at Madrid	3-Mar-2019
726	Kerman Aurrekoetxea Alegria	(N8)		v Romania at Madrid	3-Mar-2019
727	David Mélé	(Flyhalf)		v Belgium at Madrid	10-Mar-2019
728	Ien Ashcroft-Leigh	(Lock)		v Germany at Cologne	17-Mar-2019
729	Diego Carvajales Rodriguez	(Hooker)		v Germany at Cologne	17-Mar-2019
730	Thierry Futeu Youtcheu	(Prop)		v Germany at Cologne	17-Mar-2019
731	Juan Pablo Guido	(N8)		v Germany at Cologne	17-Mar-2019
732	Mattius Pisapia Perez	(Prop)		v Brazil at São Paulo	8-Jun-2019
733	Pablo Miejimolle Ligero	(Hooker)		v Uruguay at Montevideo	22-Jun-2019
734	J. W. Bell	Fullback		v Hong Kong at Madrid	23-Nov-2019
735	Nathan Paila	Flanker		v Hong Kong at Madrid	23-Nov-2019
736	Nicolas Jurado	(Prop)		v Hong Kong at Madrid	23-Nov-2019
737	Matthew Bebe Smith	(Hooker)		v Russia at Sochi	1-Feb-2020
738	Martín Alonso	(Wing)		v Georgia at Madrid	9-Feb-2020
739	Pierre Nueno	(Centre)		v Georgia at Madrid	9-Feb-2020
740	José María Díaz	(Prop)		v Romania at Botoşani	22-Feb-2020
741	Baltazar Taibo	(Wing)		v Romania at Botoşani	22-Feb-2020
742	Nicolás Nieto	Centre		v Belgium at Woluwe-Saint-Lambert	7-Mar-2020
743	Gonzalo Vinuesa	(Flyhalf)		v Belgium at Woluwe-Saint-Lambert	7-Mar-2020
744	Andres Alvarado	Prop		v Uruguay at Montevideo	1-Nov-2020
745	Bautista Güemes	Centre		v Uruguay at Montevideo	1-Nov-2020
746	Joel Merkler	(Prop)		v Uruguay at Montevideo	1-Nov-2020
747	Dani Barranco Heyes	(Flyhalf)		v Uruguay at Montevideo	6-Nov-2020
748	Leandro Wozniak	(Prop)		v Uruguay at Montevideo	6-Nov-2020
749	Bastien Dedieu	(Prop)		v Portugal at Madrid	7-Feb-2021
750	Facundo Nahuel Dominguez Gatell	(Flanker)		v Portugal at Madrid	7-Feb-2021
751	Manuel Ordas	(Centre)		v Portugal at Madrid	7-Feb-2021
752	Alejandro Alonso	Centre		v Georgia at Madrid	14-Mar-2021
753	Brice Ferrer	(Flanker)		v Georgia at Madrid	14-Mar-2021
754	Santiago Ovejero Abdala	Hooker		v Fiji at Madrid	6-Nov-2021
755	Jerry Davoibaravi	(Flanker)		v Fiji at Madrid	6-Nov-2021
756	Gavin van den Berg			v Netherlands at Amsterdam	18-Dec-2021
757	Guillermo Moretón			v Netherlands at Amsterdam	18-Dec-2021
758	Ekain Imaz			v Canada at Ottawa	10-Jul-2022
759	Ignacio Piñeiro			v Canada at Ottawa	10-Jul-2022
760	Pedro de la Lastra			v Canada at Ottawa	10-Jul-2022
761	Raúl Calzón			v Tonga at Málaga	5-Nov-2022
762	Gonzalo López Bontempo			v Tonga at Málaga	5-Nov-2022
763	Alejandro Suárez Rodríguez			v Tonga at Málaga	5-Nov-2022
764	Nico Rocaríes	Scrum-half		v Tonga at Málaga	5-Nov-2022
765	Mario Pichardie			v Namibia at Madrid	12-Nov-2022
766	Matheo Triki			v Namibia at Madrid	12-Nov-2022
767	Estanislao Bay	Scrum-half		v Netherlands at Madrid	5-Feb-2023
768	Lucas Santamaria	Prop		v Netherlands at Madrid	5-Feb-2023
769	Ike Irusta	Scrum-half		v Netherlands at Madrid	5-Feb-2023
770	Alberto Carmona	Wing		v Netherlands at Madrid	5-Feb-2023
771	Marc Sánchez	Lock		v Portugal at Lisbon	4-Mar-2023
772	Martiniano Cian	Wing		v Argentina at Madrid	26-Aug-2023
773	Marcos Muñiz	Prop		v Canadá at Villajoyosa	11-Nov-2023
774	Pepe Borraz			v Canadá at Villajoyosa	11-Nov-2023
775	Pau Aira	Centre		v Canadá at Villajoyosa	11-Nov-2023
776	Nicolás Fernández-Durán			v USA at Villajoyosa	18-Nov-2023
777	Joaquín Gali			v USA at Villajoyosa	18-Nov-2023
778	Imanol Urraza			v Netherlands at Amsterdam	3-Feb-2024
779	Tomás Domínguez Palazzolo			v Netherlands at Amsterdam	3-Feb-2024
780	Álex Saleta			v Germany at Madrid	11-Feb-2024
781	Alejandro Pérez Jimeno			v Germany at Madrid	11-Feb-2024
782	Enrique Cuadrado	Prop		v Germany at Madrid	11-Feb-2024
783	Borja Ibáñez			v Georgia at Tbilisi	17-Feb-2024
784	Ximun Bessonart			v Portugal at Lisboa	2-Mar-2024
785	Gonzalo Otamendi	Fly-half		v Romania at París	17-Mar-2024
786	Bernardo Vázquez			v Samoa at Apia	13-Jul-2024
787	Hugo Pirlet	Prop		v Samoa at Apia	13-Jul-2024
788	Vicente Boronat			v Samoa at Apia	13-Jul-2024
789	Pablo Pérez Meroño	Scrum-half		v Samoa at Apia	13-Jul-2024
790	Facundo López Bontempo	Centre		v Samoa at Apia	13-Jul-2024
791	Manuel Alfaro Torneiro	Centre		v Tonga at Nuku’alofa	19-Jul-2024
792	Pablo Guirao	Lock		v Uruguay at Madrid	9-Nov-2024
793	Jacobo Ruiz	Prop		v Fiji at Valladolid	16-Nov-2024
794	Hugo González Hernández	Prop		v USA at Madrid	23-Nov-2024
795	Manex Ariceta	Lock		v Netherlands at Madrid	2-Feb-2025
796	Lucien Richardis	Fly-half		v Switzerland at Yverdon-les-Bains	9-Feb-2025
797	Antonio Ray Suárez	Lock		v Fiji at Málaga	22-Nov-2025
798	Alejandro Laforga	Wing		v Fiji at Málaga	22-Nov-2025
799	Yago Fernández Vilar	Centre		v Fiji at Málaga	22-Nov-2025
800	Samuel Ezeala	Centre		v Netherlands at Ámsterdam	7-Feb-2026
801	Nicolás Infer	Scrum-half		v Netherlands at Ámsterdam	7-Feb-2026
802	Aniol Franch	Prop		v Switzerland at Valladolid	14-Feb-2026
803	Oriol Marsinyac	Centre		v Switzerland at Valladolid	14-Feb-2026
804	Iker Aduriz	Prop		v Switzerland at Valladolid	14-Feb-2026
805	Luca Tabarot	Prop		v Georgia at Tbilisi	21-Feb-2026
806	Beltrán Ortega	Wing		v Georgia at Tbilisi	21-Feb-2026
807	Guido Reyes	Prop		v Georgia at Tbilisi	21-Feb-2026
808	Jaime Manteca	Wing	2	v Canada at Edmonton	5-Jul-2026
809	Gabriel Vélez	Lock	1	v Tonga at Edmonton	11-Jul-2026
810	Diego González Blanco	Flanker	1	v Tonga at Edmonton	11-Jul-2026
811	Jeremy Trevithick	Wing	1	v Tonga at Edmonton	11-Jul-2026
812	Gauthier Maravat	Lock	1	v Chile at Leganés (Madrid)	14-Nov-2026
