= Luis Javier Martínez =

Spain international rugby union player

- Born: 12 July 1971 (age 55) Lugo, Galicia, Spain
- Height: 6 ft 4 in (1.93 m)
- Weight: 252 lb (114 kg)

Rugby union career
- Position: Prop
Senior career
Years	Team	Apps	(Points)
- Xabarín RC
- Oviedo Rugby
International career
Years	Team	Apps	(Points)
1998-1999	Spain	6	(0)

Luis Javier Martínez Villanueva (born Lugo, 12 July 1971) is a former Spanish rugby union player. He used to play as a prop.

== Career ==
His first international cap was during a match against Germany, at Heidelberg, on 26 April 1998. He was part of the 1999 Rugby World Cup roster, where he played two matches. He was one of the Oviedo players who were in the roster, alongside Aitor Etxeberría, Sergio Souto and Carlos Souto.
