= Guido Reyes =

Spanish rugby union player

- Full name: Guido Reyes Rendón
- Born: 18 July 2005 (age 21) Bargas, Spain
- Height: 1.85 m (6 ft 1 in)

Rugby union career
- Position: Prop
- Current team: Section Paloise
Senior career
Years	Team	Apps	(Points)
2022–	Section Paloise		
2025–2026	→ Stado Tarbes (loan)	1	(0)
International career
Years	Team	Apps	(Points)
2022–	Spain U18		
2023–	Spain U20	2	(0)
2026–	Spain	1	(0)

Guido Reyes Rendón (born 18 July 2005) is a Spanish professional rugby union player. He plays as a prop for Section Paloise.

== Early life ==
Guido Reyes was born in Bargas, in Castilla-La Mancha, Spain. He started playing Rugby union at the age of three. He joined Quijote Rugby Club in Yuncos. In 2019, he moved to San Isidro Rugby Club in Madrid. He was identified as a talented young player by the Spanish Rugby Federation. In 2020, he entered the national talent development programmes. Reyes played for the regional team of Madrid. He also played for Spain at under-14, under-16 and under-18 levels.

In 2022, he won a bronze medal with the Spain U18 team at the Rugby Europe Championship.

== Club career ==
Guido Reyes joined the academy of Section Paloise in 2022. Reyes developed through the academy of Section Paloise after joining the club. A regular member of the Espoirs squad, he progressed steadily and was invited to train with the professional group ahead of the 2025–26 season.

He joined Stade Tarbes Pyrénées Rugby on loan for the 2025–26 season to gain senior experience.

== International career ==
Reyes was a member of the Spain under-18 squad that won the bronze medal at the 2022 Rugby Europe Under-18 Championship. He later represented the Spain under-20 team in international competitions. In 2024, he played at the World Rugby Under 20 Championship. In 2025, he again represented Spain U20 at the 2025 World Rugby U20 Championship in Italy, where he featured in all five matches. Reyes was called up to the senior squad in November 2025 to prepare for the match against Fiji.

He made his debut for the senior Spain national team, coached by Pablo Bouza, on 21 February 2026 in a group stage match of the 2026 Rugby Europe Championship against Georgia.

== Personal life ==
Reyes is of Colombian and Argentine descent.

== Honours ==
Spain U18

Bronze medal at the Rugby Europe Championship: 2022
