= Aitor Etxeberría =

Spanish rugby union player

- Born: 21 February 1976 (age 50) Gorliz, Basque Country, Spain
- Height: 6 ft 12 in (2.13 m)
- Weight: 204 lb (93 kg)

Rugby union career
- Position: Flyhalf
Senior career
Years	Team	Apps	(Points)
1993-2000	Oviedo Rugby		
2000-2006	Gernika RT		
International career
Years	Team	Apps	(Points)
1997-2006	Spain	7	(32)

Aitor Etxeberría de la Rosa (born 21 February 1976 in Gorliz) is a Spanish rugby union player. He plays as a fly-half. He is left-footed and he usually filled in regularly for Kovalenco.

== Career ==
His first international match was against Andorra, at Andorra la Vella, on 8 November 1997. He was part of the 1999 Rugby World Cup roster, playing the match against South Africa.
