= Oviedo RC =

Spanish rugby union club, based in Oviedo

Real Oviedo Rugby
- Full name: Oviedo Rugby Club
- Founded: 1983; 43 years ago
- Location: Oviedo, Spain
- Ground: El Naranco
- Chairman: Jaime Martínez González-Río
- Coach: Mario Copetti
- League: División de Honor B – Group A
- 2014–15: División de Honor B – Group A, 7th
1st kit	2nd kit

Official website
- www.oviedorugby.com

Oviedo Rugby Club is a Spanish rugby union club. The club was established in 1983 and currently competes in the División de Honor B de Rugby competition, the second level of Spanish club rugby. The club is based in Oviedo, Asturias and it is considered the most successful team in the Asturian rugby. Oviedo RC plays in blue and white colours. The team played in the División de Honor in four seasons (1990–91, 1998–99, 1999-2000, 2000–01).

Since the 2014–15 season, the team plays with the name of Real Oviedo Rugby after a sponsorship agreement with the local football club.

== Trophies ==
- Primera Nacional:
  - Champions: 1989-90, 1994–95, 1995–96, 1997–98
  - Runners-up: 1988-89, 1996–97
- Asturian Regional Championship

== Season by season ==
Season	Tier	Division	Pos.	Notes
1987–88	2	Primera Nacional	4th	
1988–89	2	Primera Nacional	2nd	
1989–90	2	Primera Nacional	1st	Promoted
1990–91	1	División de Honor	12th	Relegated
1991–92	2	Primera Nacional	8th	
1992–93	2	Primera Nacional	5th	
1993–94	2	Primera Nacional	3rd	
1994–95	2	Primera Nacional	1st	
1995–96	2	Primera Nacional	1st	
1996–97	2	Primera Nacional	2nd	
1997–98	2	Primera Nacional	1st	Promoted
1998–99	1	División de Honor	9th	
1999–00	1	División de Honor	7th	
2000–01	1	División de Honor	10th	Relegated
2001–02	2	División de Honor B	7th	

Season	Tier	Division	Pos.	Notes
2002–03	2	División de Honor B	6th	
2003–04	2	División de Honor B	4th	
2004–05	2	División de Honor B	6th	
2005–06	2	División de Honor B	7th	
2006–07	2	División de Honor B	7th	
2007–08	2	División de Honor B	7th	
2008–09	2	División de Honor B	6th	
2009–10	2	División de Honor B	4th	
2010–11	2	División de Honor B	5th	
2011–12	2	División de Honor B	3rd	
2012–13	2	División de Honor B	3rd	
2013–14	2	División de Honor B	6th	
2013–14	2	División de Honor B	6th	
2014–15	2	División de Honor B	7th	
2015–16	2	División de Honor B	7th	

- 4 seasons in División de Honor

== International honours ==
- (Spain) Xabier Guerediaga
- (Spain) Carlos Souto Vidal (played 1999 Rugby World Cup)
- (Spain) Sergio Souto Vidal (played 1999 Rugby World Cup)
- (Spain) Luis Javier Martinez Villanueva (played 1999 Rugby World Cup)
- (Spain) Aitor Etxeberria de la Rosa (played 1999 Rugby World Cup)
- (Spain) Fernando Tejada Chacon
- (Spain) Joaquín Uría Hidalgo
- (Spain) Luis Alfonso Cano García
