= Esteban Roqué =

Spain international rugby union player

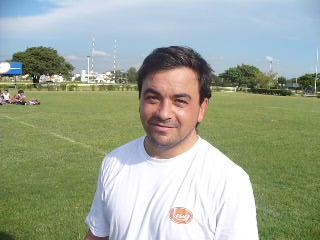
- Full name: Esteban Roqué Segovia
- Born: 16 May 1974 (age 52) Córdoba, Argentina
- Height: 5 ft 9 in (175 cm)
- Weight: 161 lb (73 kg)

Rugby union career
- Position: Fly-half
International career
Years	Team	Apps	(Points)
2004–2007	Spain	22	(285)

Esteban Roqué Segovia (born 16 May 1974) is an Argentine-born former international rugby union player.

== Rugby career ==
A native of Córdoba, Roqué was a fly-half and won a Campeonato Argentino title with his province in 2001, then spent the next six years playing in Spanish rugby. He played for CR El Salvador and was a member of the Spain national team from 2004, proving to be a reliable goal-kicker during his four years of international rugby, with 285 points from 22 appearances. On his return to Argentina, Roqué played rugby with the Córdoba-based club Club La Tablada.

== See also ==
- List of Spain national rugby union players
