= Astondo =

Astondo is a seaside community in northern Spain, near Gorliz, province of Bizkaia, in the Basque Country. Alongside Plentzia and Gorliz, it forms one of the largest beaches on the coast of the Bay of Biscay, spanning more than 4 km in length and with 200 metres of cliffs.

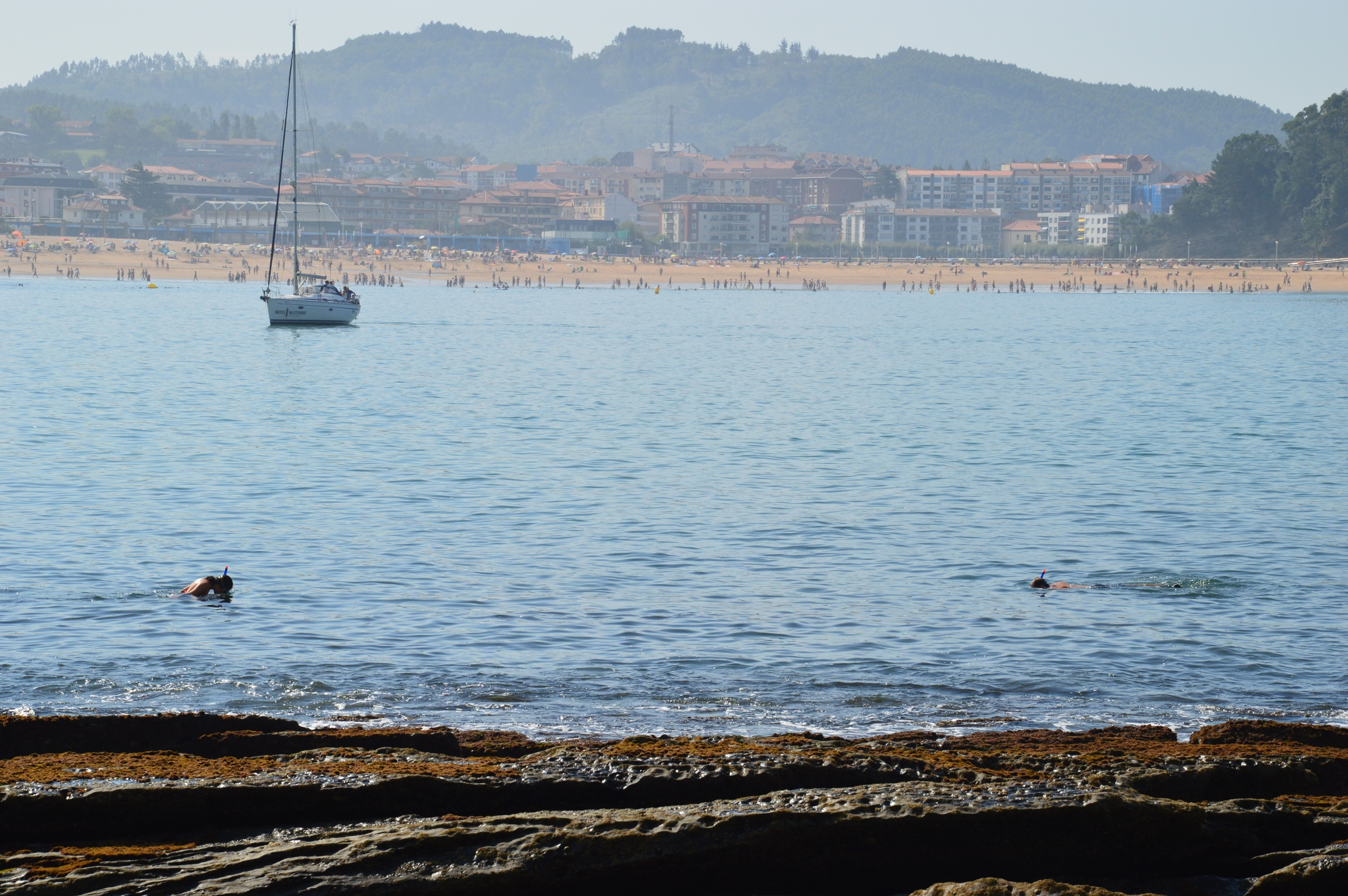
Astondo

The main neighborhoods near Astondo are Areatza, Andra Mari, Gandia and Urezarantza. Astondo is surrounded by some of the most prominent peaks of the Basque Mountains: to the east are Ermua (288 m), Urzuri (270 m) and Aizkorri (148 m), and to the south are Martiartu (123 m) and Junkera (84 m). The rocky islet of Billano is just off the coast, directly across from Cape Billano.

Region	Biscay
Location	43°25′17″N 2°56′59″W
Population (Gorliz)	5,151 and in summer this number increases

== History ==
Because of its geography, Astondo has long had a primarily maritime economy. There are many advantages that the fields and lands of this village allowed for ranching and livestock breeding. Forestry was also popular in the region, giving the working class the opportunity to earn money. Many trees in the hills were chopped down for shipbuilding. In 1740, Astondo was considered one of the most important pieces of the fleet merchant of all Biscay as measured by the trade in iron ore. Between them, Gorliz and Astondo had 15 vessels with a total capacity of 5,280 hundredweight, equivalent to 264 tonnes.

When the Bay of Biscay notified the presence of the English war-naves in 1741, they decided to protect this coast for preventing possible attacks. This land had the support of its bunkers which were built in XVIII, and they used to work until the middle of the XIX. Nowadays, they are located between the Areatza borough and Azkorriaga, where today some remains can still be seen.

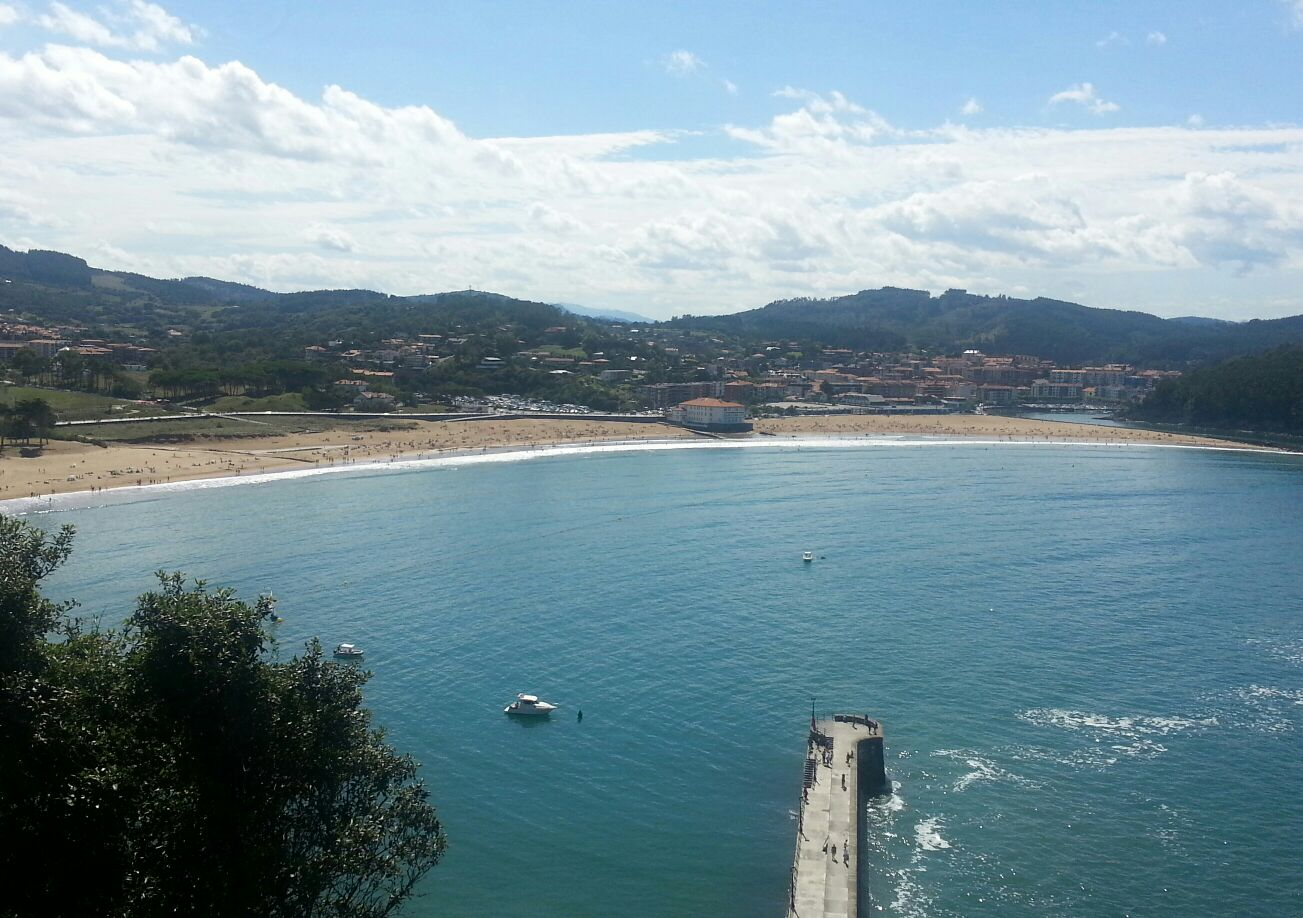
Plentzia, Gorliz and Astondo

During the period of industrialisation in Spain, the hospital of Gorliz was built as a residence for the summer. Here we can see the start of the summer break in this place.

== Tourism ==
Astondo's many interesting environments and gentle climate make it one of the most visited places in the Uribe Kosta. Walking down to the beach, one can see the hospital of Gorliz, which was originally built for the Heliotherapy Sanatorium Marine, founded in 1919. At that time, it was an important center of treatment of tuberculosis in children. The building was also the first in the Iberian Peninsula to be erected with reinforced concrete.

== Festivities ==
- San Pedro, 29 June – Iberre borough
- Santiago, 25 July
- Urezarantza-Fao, 3 August
- Andra Mari, 5 August

== Transport ==
Astondo is accessible from the BI-2120 road to Mungia, taking the exit from the Saratxaga roundabout to Gorliz and then taking the BI-3158 (Uresarantze Bidea), that goes to Gorliz Hospital. There are also several bus lines close to the beach and from the last stop on Line 1 of the underground Bilbao Metro, "Plentzia", it is a pleasant walk of around 2 km along the edge of the River Butroe estuary to Gorliz beach.
