= Joaquín Uría =

- Full name: Joaquín Uría Hidalgo
- Born: May 16, 1957 Gijón, Spain
- Died: 19 February 2018 (aged 60) Gijón, Spain
- Height: 1.80 m (5 ft 11 in)
- Weight: 95 kg (209 lb)
- Occupation: Electrician

Rugby union career
- Position(s): Prop, Lock
Senior career
Years	Team	Apps	(Points)
1973-1975	Real Sporting de Gijón Rugby		
1975-1978	Saint-Jean-de-Luz Olympique		
1978-1988	Gijón Rugby Club		
1988-1991	Oviedo RC		
International career
Years	Team	Apps	(Points)
1976-1986	Spain	16	(0)
1979-1980	Spain U-23	2	(0)
1974-1975	Spain U-20	4	(0)

Joaquín Uría Hidalgo (Gijón, 16 May 1957 - Gijón, 19 February 2018), was a Spanish rugby union player who played as prop. He was an international for Spain with 16 caps (10 of which with the main team) between 1975 and 1986, being considered one of the most important forwards from the rugby history of Asturias. He played as prop and lock.

== Career ==
Uría started his career for the rugby section of Real Sporting de Gijón between 1973 and 1975. He then went to France to play for Saint-Jean-de-Luz Olympique between 1975 and 1978. After his stint in the French league, he returned to Sporting de Gijón, where he played for an entire decade. In his latter career, he played for Oviedo RC and retired while playing for Gijón Rugby Club in the late 1990s.

== International caps ==
Uría debuted for Spain on 27 November 1976 against Italy in Rome. He earned 10 caps in aggregate, adding 2 with the under-23 team and 4 in the youth category.

== Death ==
On 19 February 2018, Uría died at the age of 60.
