= Pablo Feijoo =

Spain international rugby union player

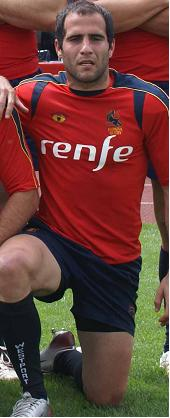
- Born: Paolo Feijoo Ugalde; 18 May 1982 (age 44) San Sebastián, Spain
- Height: 1.74 m (5 ft 9 in)
- Weight: 74 kg (163 lb)
- Notable relative: Alfonso Feijoo (father)

Rugby union career
- Position: Scrum-half
Senior career
Years	Team	Apps	(Points)
2000–2007	Bera Bera		
2007	Leicester		
2007–2008	Waterloo FC		
2008–2010	CRC Pozuelo		
2009	Gatos de Madrid		
2010–2014	El Salvador Rugby		
2014–2016	CR Cisneros		
International career
Years	Team	Apps	(Points)
2002–2015	Spain	67	(100)
- Correct as of 8 March 2021
National sevens team
Years	Team		Comps
2002–18	Spain 7s		

Pablo Feijoo Ugalde (born 18 May 1982) is a Spanish rugby sevens former player and coach.

He played in the 2013 Rugby World Cup Sevens in Russia. He was in the squad that secured the last Olympic spot when they defeated Samoa 7s in Monaco. He was selected for the Spanish national rugby sevens team for the 2016 Summer Olympics. Feijoo retired from international play after the 2016 Olympics.

Feijoo was head coach of the Spain national rugby sevens team from 2016 to 2022.
