= Bargas =

- Municipality
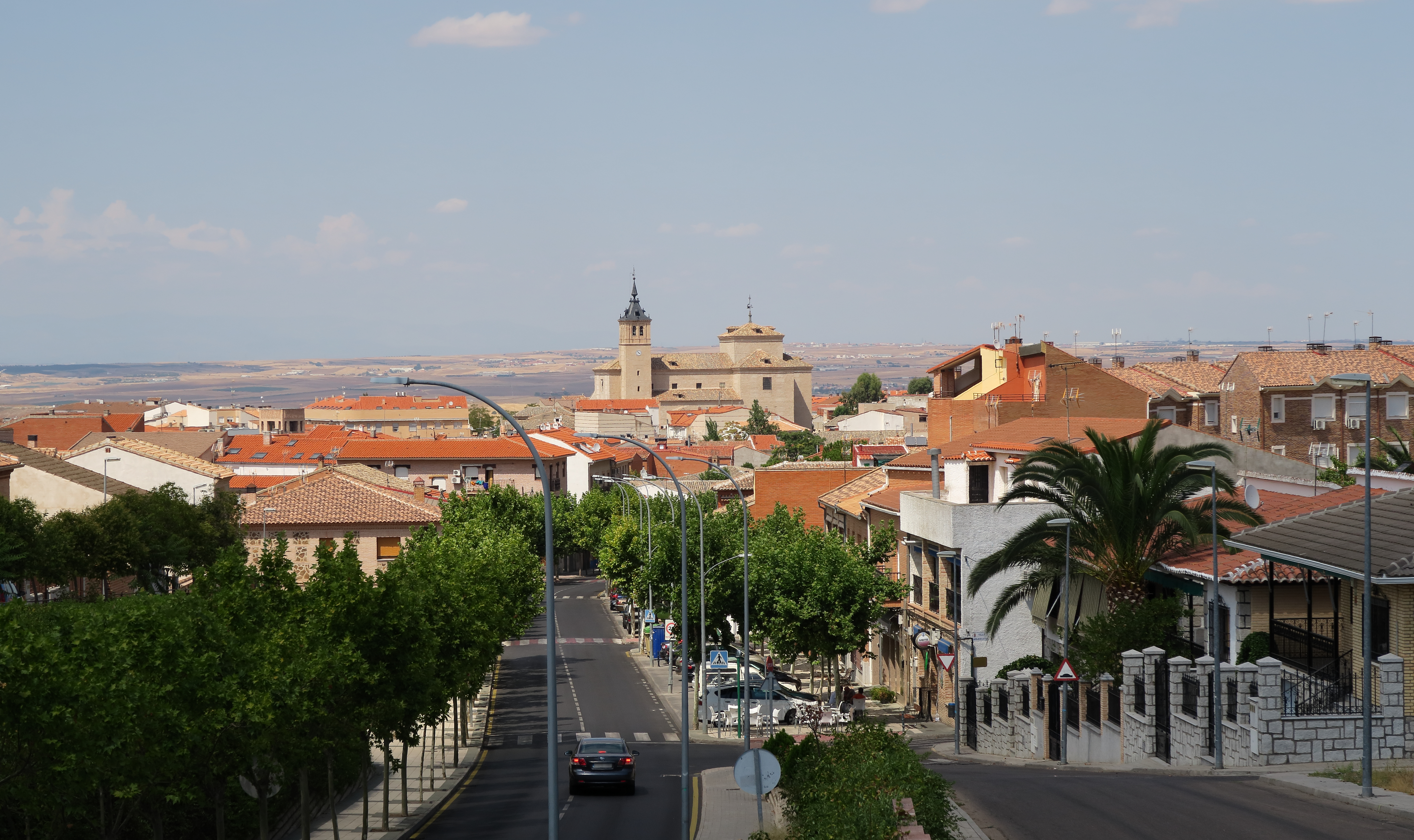

- Flag Coat of arms

- Location in Spain Bargas (Spain)
- Coordinates: 39°56′24″N 4°01′10″W
- Country: Spain
- Autonomous community: Castilla–La Mancha
- Province: Toledo

Area
  - Total: 89.71 km^{2} (34.64 sq mi)
- Elevation: 500 m (1,600 ft)

Population (2025-01-01)
  - Total: 11,274
  - Density: 125.7/km^{2} (325.5/sq mi)
- Time zone: UTC+1 (CET)
  - Summer (DST): UTC+2 (CEST)

Bargas is a municipality of Spain located in the province of Toledo, Castilla–La Mancha.

The municipality spans across a total area of 89.71 km^{2} and, as of 1 January 2020, it has a population of 10,535.

== History ==
Despite the ongoing Almoravid razzias in July 1117, Bargas' repopulation started by that time. The original urban settlement was called "Valdeolivas", and it was left forsaken. Bargas enjoys a strong bread-making tradition. French counterrevolutionaries arrived to the village in September 1792. The opening of the Madrid–Lisbon line in 1881 brought a rail connection to Bargas. A Socialist Casa del pueblo was opened in the village in 1907.

== Demographics ==
Historical population
Year	Pop.	±%
1900	3,437	—
1910	3,601	+4.8%
1920	3,800	+5.5%
1930	3,863	+1.7%
1940	3,535	−8.5%
1950	3,707	+4.9%
1960	3,510	−5.3%
1970	3,643	+3.8%
1981	4,747	+30.3%
1991	6,207	+30.8%
2001	6,980	+12.5%
2011	9,666	+38.5%
2021	10,611	+9.8%
2023	10,978	+3.5%
Source: INE
