= Sergio Souto =

Spain international rugby union player

- Born: November 4, 1976 (age 50) Oviedo, Asturias, Spain
- Height: 6 ft 4 in (1.93 m)
- Weight: 234 lb (106 kg)

Rugby union career
- Position: Lock
Senior career
Years	Team	Apps	(Points)
1989-1993	Piller Rugby Club		
1993-2005	Oviedo Rugby		
2005-2006	El Salvador Rugby		
2006-2011	Olympus Rugby XV Madrid		
International career
Years	Team	Apps	(Points)
1999-2011	Spain	48	(15)

Sergio Souto Vidal (born Oviedo, 4 November 1976) is a Spanish rugby union player. He plays as a lock. His twin brother Carlos Souto was also a Spanish international.

== Career ==
His first international match was on August 24, 1999, against Fiji, at Avezzano. He was part of the 1999 Rugby World Cup roster and played in the match against Uruguay, at Galashiels. His last international match was against Romania, at Bucharest, on March 19, 2011.
