= Pablo Pérez =

Pablo Perez may refer to:

- Battle of Pablo Perez, 1816 battle between Portugal and Banda Oriental
- Pablo Pérez Álvarez (born 1969), Venezuelan politician
- Pablo Pérez Companc (born 1982), Argentine racing driver
- Pablo Pérez Coronado (born 1984), Spanish politician, economist and professor
- Pablo Pérez Zañartu (1915–1987), Chilean engineer and public official
- Pablo Pérez (footballer, born 1985), Argentine football midfielder
- Pablo Pérez (footballer, born 1993), Spanish football attacking midfielder for Langreo
- Pablo Pérez (footballer, born 2001), Spanish football left-back for Atlético Madrid B
