= Gorliz =

- Municipality
- Gorliz
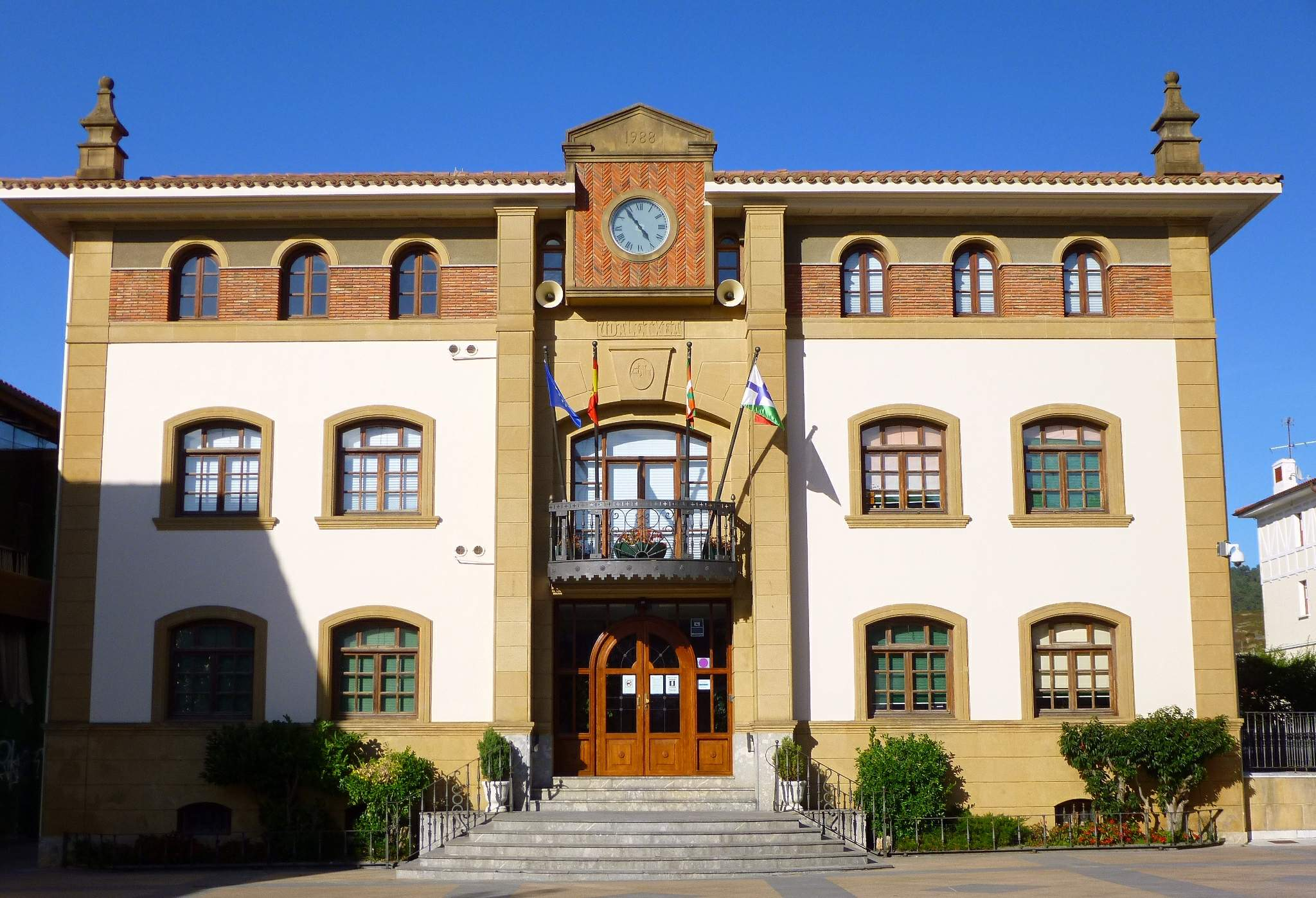
- Town hall

- Flag Coat of arms

- Location of Gorliz within the Basque Country Gorliz (Spain)
- Coordinates: 43°24′58″N 2°55′58″W
- Country: Spain
- Autonomous community: Basque Country
- Province: Biscay
- Comarca: Mungialdea
- Founded: Before the 13th century

Government
  - Mayor: Arantza Etxebarria (2011) (EAJ-PNV)

Area
  - Total: 10.29 km^{2} (3.97 sq mi)
- Elevation: 125 m (410 ft)

Population (2025-01-01)
  - Total: 6,034
- Demonym: Gorliztarra
- Postal code: 48630
- Dialing code: 94677
- Website: http://www.gorliz.net

Gorliz (Basque: [goɾlis̻]) is a town and municipality located in the province of Biscay, which lies within the autonomous community of the Basque Country, in northern Spain. The town had 5,664 inhabitants in 2014.

Gorliz consists of the following neighborhoods: Elexalde, Santa María, Uresaranse (Urezarantza), Gandia, Areatza, San José, Guzurmendi and Orabille.

Its economy is mainly based on the services sector. Its principal source of income is the tourism. Over last years it has become one of the most touristic centres in Biscay.

== Places of interest ==
One of the biggest attractions of the municipality is the beach and nearby pine forest. Near the northernmost part of the beach, sometimes considered as the separated Beach of Astondo, lie the Petrified Dunes of Astondo, which were declared a Site of Community Importance.

Churches such as the Church of the Immaculate Conception, founded in the 10th century and remodeled in 1781, and the church of Santa María (Andra Mari) are also attractions. In Cabo Villano, Billao in Basque, about 30 minutes from downtown, magnificent views can be enjoyed along the lighthouse. In this area there are cannons and underground galleries built after the Spanish Civil War by Francoist Spain, using prisoners of war on the Republican side, in anticipation of a hypothetical landing of the Allies after World War II that never came. Gorliz also has a camping, a youth hostel and many other places of interest.

== Beach ==
With a length of 842 m and a width of 120 m, Gorliz beach was recently remodelled. It is accessible from the BI-2120 road to Mungia, taking the exit from the Saratxaga roundabout to Gorliz and then taking the BI-3158 (Uresarantze Bidea), which leads to Gorliz Hospital. Several bus lines also stop close to the beach, and from the last stop on Line 1 of the Bilbao Metro, "Plentzia," it is approximately 2 km on foot along the edge of the River Butroe estuary to Gorliz beach.

== Gorliz's Marine Sanatorium ==
At the beginning of the 20th century, the properties of the baths of sea, the new medicine for rehab and a new concept of free time fixed new habits and treatments (Marine Sanatoria). But the history of this first marine sanatorium of the Biscayan coast was born from the ideas of several doctors, between whom Dr. Enrique Areilza stood out. The idea attracted the attention of the Deputation of Biscay, presided in those moments by Luis de Salazar.

== Politics ==
From 1979-2007 Górliz's mayors belonged to the Basque Nationalist Party (in 1999 and in 2003 Patxo Igartua was elected, having presented the PNV in coalition with Eusko Alkartasuna). In 2007 there were separate EA and PNV. The PNV was again the most voted, but obtained a simple majority of 40% of the valid votes (those of Basque Nationalist Action were considered null), which earned him only six of the 13 councillors. Emma Calzada of the Independent Group was elected mayor of Gorliz, with the votes of his group (four councillors), the Basque PP (PP-PV, 1 councillor), Ezker Batua - Berdeak - Aralar (one councillor) and Eusko Alkartasuna (EA, one councillor).

== Festivals ==
On June 29, San Pedro festivity, a pilgrimage takes place in the neighborhood of Iberre. The main festivity of Gorliz is celebrated around July 25, Santiago day. The festive activities include an "Habaneras" festival and Basque Poliphony. The neighborhood Andra Mari celebrates its singular festivities the first weekend of August, with its traditional paella contest and with the pilgrimage on August 5 in honor of the Virgin of Andra Mari de Aguirre and Las Nieves. The third weekend of August the festivities of Urezarantza-Fano neighborhood take place. On December 8, feast of Immaculate Conception, a Christmas fair and a snails in "vizcaina" style contest are celebrated.

== Population ==
Population of Gorliz
1897	1900	1910	1920	1930	1940	1950	1960	1970	1981	1991	2001	2006	2010	2014
966	956	1269	1511	1623	1426	1486	1676	2014	2986	2917	4486	5049	5503	5664
