= Alfonso Feijoo =

Spain international rugby union player

- Born: Alfonso Feijoo García; 5 January 1953 (age 73) San Sebastián, Basque Country, Spain
- Notable relative: Pablo Feijoo (son)

Rugby union career
- Position: Centre
Amateur team(s)
Years	Team	Apps	(Points)
- Club Atlético San Sebastián
Senior career
Years	Team	Apps	(Points)
- CR Cisneros
International career
Years	Team	Apps	(Points)
1972-1979	Spain	9	(0)
Coaching career
- Years: Team
- -: Bera Bera RT
- 1997-2003: Spain

Alfonso Feijoo García (born in San Sebastián, 5 January 1953) is a former Spanish rugby union footballer and a current coach. He's also a Physical Education teacher in San Sebastián.

Feijoo had 23 caps for Spain, during his career. He later become a rugby union coach, taking office as head coach of Spain, in 1997. He achieved his country first ever qualification for the Rugby World Cup finals. Spain played in the 1999 Rugby World Cup finals, but lost all the three matches.

He was elected President of the Spanish Rugby Federation at May 2014.
