= Carlos Souto (rugby union) =

Spanish rugby union player

- Born: November 4, 1976 (age 50) Oviedo, Asturias, Spain
- Height: 6 ft 3 in (1.91 m)
- Weight: 246 lb (112 kg)
- Notable relative: Sergio Souto (brother)
- Occupation: Civil Guard officer

Rugby union career
- Position: Blindside flanker
Senior career
Years	Team	Apps	(Points)
1989–1993	Piller Rugby Club		
1993–2005	Oviedo Rugby		
2001–2005	Moraleja Alcobendas Rugby Union		
2005–2006	El Salvador Rugby		
International career
Years	Team	Apps	(Points)
1998–2010	Spain	37	(30)

Carlos Souto Vidal (born 4 November 1976) is a Spanish rugby union player. He played as a flanker. His twin brother, Sergio Souto was also a Spanish international.

== Career ==
His first international cap was on December 2, 1998, against Portugal at Murrayfield. He played all the three matches for Spain at the 1999 Rugby World Cup. His last cap was at the match against Romania on March 27, 2010, at Bucharest.

== Personal life ==
He works as an officer for the Civil Guard. His twin brother, Sergio was also a rugby union player and both played for Spain at the 1999 Rugby World Cup, Spain's only appearance in a Rugby World Cup to date.
