= Spain national rugby union team =

Men's rugby union team representing Spain

spain
- Nickname: Los Leones (The Lions)
- Emblem: Lion
- Union: Spanish Rugby Federation
- Head coach: Pablo Bouza
- Captain: Fernando López
- Most caps: Francisco Puertas (93)
- Top scorer: Esteban Roqué (285)
- Top try scorer: César Sempere (31)
- Home stadium: Estadio Universidad Complutense de Madrid
First colours	Second colours

World Rugby ranking
- Current: 14 (as of 15 September 2025)
- Highest: 14 (15 September 2025)
- Lowest: 32 (2004, 2005)

First international
- Spain 9–0 Italy (Barcelona, Spain; 20 May 1929)

Biggest win
- Spain 90–8 Czech Republic (Madrid, Spain; 2 April 1995)

Biggest defeat
- Spain 10–92 Australia (Madrid, Spain; 1 November 2001)

World Cup
- Appearances: 2 (Note: Though Spain had qualified for the 2019 and 2023 World Cups, they were expelled after their qualification.) (first in 1999)
- Best result: Pool stage (1999)
- Website: ferugby.es

The Spain national rugby union team, nicknamed Los Leones (The Lions), is administered by the Spanish Rugby Federation. The team competes in the annual European Nations Cup, the highest European rugby championship outside the Six Nations. The national side is ranked 17th in the world (as of 20 July 2026).

Rugby union in Spain dates back to 1901, although Spain did not play its first international until 1929, beating Italy 9–0 in Barcelona. Throughout the century, Spain mostly played against other European opponents such as France, Italy, Romania, West Germany, the Soviet Union, and Portugal. The team's greatest moment of success came in 1999, when Spain qualified for the 1999 Rugby World Cup. Despite being whitewashed, the team performed admirably in a group which included South Africa and Scotland.

Today, Spain competes in the European Nations Cup against Georgia, Germany, Portugal, Romania, and Russia. Spain has never been crowned European champions, though has come close. The closest they've come to becoming European champions was in 2012, having beaten both Romania and Georgia and finishing second.

== History ==
=== Early history and amateur era ===
The exact starting point of rugby union in Spain is unknown; Catalan student Baldiri Aleu introduced the game from France to a mainstream Spanish audience in 1921, but the game might have been played on Spanish soil earlier. Through the 1920s, the game gradually gained popularity through universities in the country. The first Copa del Rey de Rugby was organized in 1926, and won by Barcelona. An unofficial Spanish XV played France, including Yves du Manoir, in 1927, but it was organised by a rebel governing body.

Spain played their first international match in 1929 in Barcelona, winning 9–0 over the - debutant as well - Italian national team at the Montjuïc Olympic Stadium. During the 1930s the Spanish rugby team played sporadically in the 1930s, playing against the national teams of Italy, Morocco, Germany, and Portugal. Due to the outbreak of World War II, rugby in much of Europe was suspended, and this included Spain. Rugby operations throughout Europe were continued in the 1950s; through this decade the Spanish struggled to the likes of West Germany, Italy and Romania. This pattern of consistency continued somewhat in the 1960s and 1970s; Spain traditionally struggled versus more established opponents such as Romania and Italy, but beat other neighboring sides such as Portugal and Morocco. However, while no official games were played between Spain and the Home Nations or the SANZAR, some Spanish sides traveled to play against various foreign sides.

The 1980s proved to be somewhat of a golden age for Spanish rugby; for the first time Spain played against non-FIRA competition, playing a test against both the Māori All Blacks as well as South American giants Argentina in November 1982, in Madrid. The Spanish were thrashed 66–3 to the Māori, but came close to upsetting Argentina, losing only 28 to 19. The Spanish also received Zimbabwe through various tests in the 80s. The Spanish recorded upsets, defeating Zimbabwe in Harare in 1984, winning 30–18.

=== World Cup begins (1987–2009) ===
Even more impressive, the Spanish swept a two-game tour in Zimbabwe, a team that had appeared in the 1987 Rugby World Cup, winning 28–16 and 14–9 in Bulawayo and Harare. Other notable results in this period included beating Uruguay 18–6, as well as giving scares to the sides of England and Scotland, and coming within 10 points of beating the Māori in 1988. By the end of the 80s, Spain was considered one of the best non-5 Nations teams in Europe, just barely behind Romania, Italy, and the Soviet Union. Spain officially joined the IRB in 1987, after not being invited for the 1987 Rugby World Cup, despite the USSR declining an invitation.

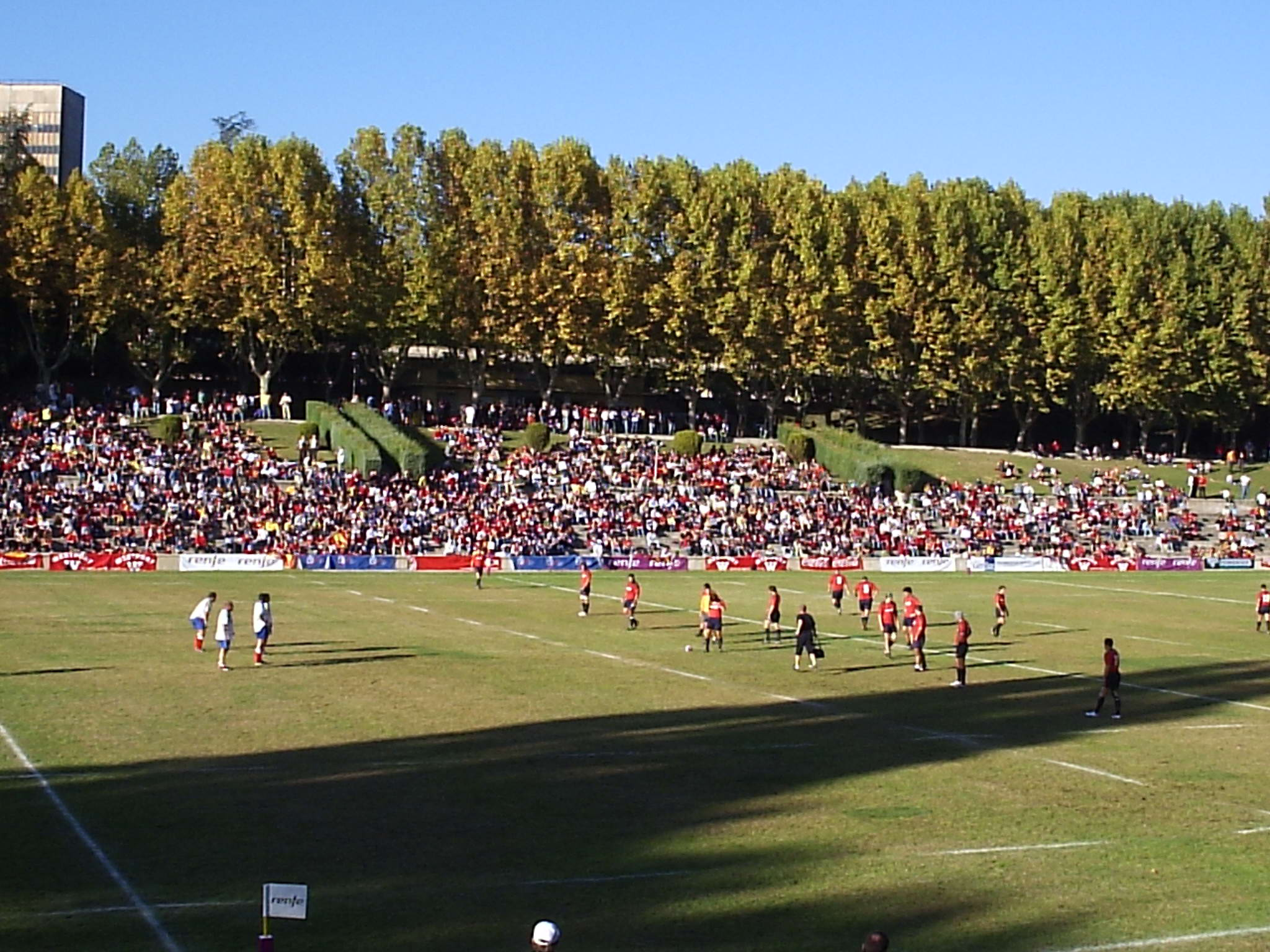
Spain playing against the Czech Republic in 2007.

The 1990s provided a mixed fortune of both near misses and eventual success. In the 1991 qualifying rounds, Spain easily toppled its first group consisting of the Netherlands, Poland and Belgium, all games being played at home. However, Spain very narrowly missed on qualifying for the Rugby World Cup, losing 19–6 against Romania, finishing third behind Italy and Romania. In 1992, Spain finally beat Romania for the first time in 1992, winning 6–0. Spain again nearly beat Argentina that same year, only losing 43–34 in a shootout in Madrid.

1995 began in similar fashion to the 1991 campaign, easily toppling the first group. However, Spain were unfortunately placed in a group with Wales, losing the key fixture 54–0, and again coming close, yet not close enough.

Spain began their quest for 1999 Rugby World Cup qualification in Pool 3 of Round B of the European qualification. They won all four of their games in the round, finishing first in the group above Portugal. They, along with Portugal advanced to the next pool round with Scotland. They finished second and qualified for their first Rugby World Cup.

For the 1999 Rugby World Cup, Spain were in Pool A, along with Scotland, South Africa and Uruguay. Their first ever World Cup game was played against Uruguay, with Spain losing 27–15. They lost their subsequent pool games to Scotland and the Springboks by 40 points, both of which were played at Murrayfield. They failed to score a try in the tournament, the only team in the World to have qualified but not scored a try in the World cup.

Spain began 2003 Rugby World Cup qualifying games in May 2002. Spain advanced to Round 3 after defeating Portugal. However, they lost to both Italy and Romania, and moved through to face Russia for a place in the repechage competition. Despite losing the first game in Madrid 3–36, and looking dead in the water, Spain pulled off a very unlikely victory, winning 38–22. Despite losing on aggregate, Spain went through the repechage due to Russia being disqualified for fielding ineligible players. They defeated Tunisia and moved on to face the United States. Spain lost 62–13 and 58–13, again missing out on the World Cup.

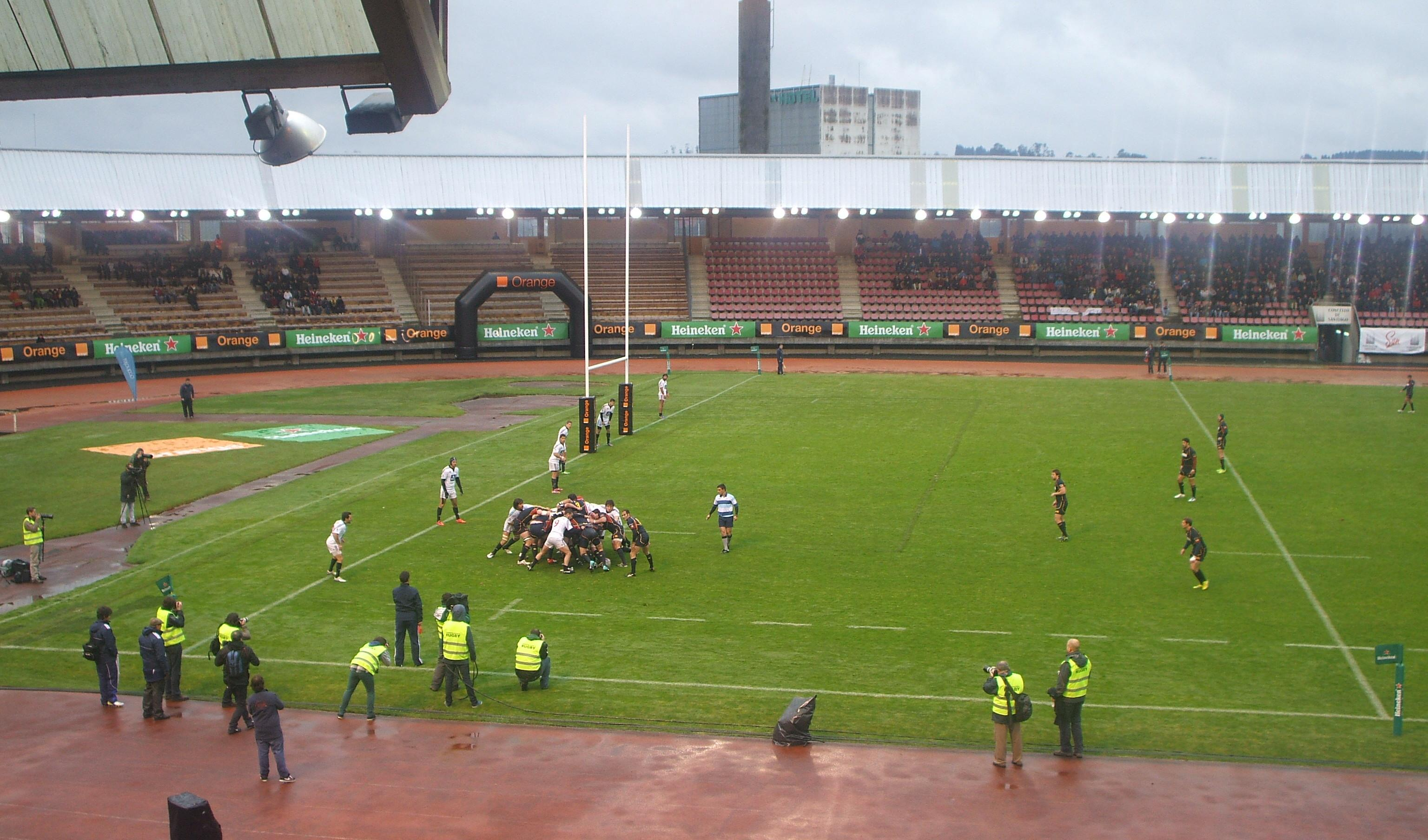
Spain playing against Portugal in 2013.

For the 2007 Rugby World Cup, Spain finished at the top of Pool A or Round 2 of the European qualification and advanced to Round 3 where they went into Pool A. Here they won all four fixtures to finish at the top and advance to the play-off. There they faced Germany, and although they lost the first game, they won the second and went through on a 42–28 aggregate and went into Round 4 where they defeated the Czech Republic to enter Round 5. However they lost out to Romania and Georgia in Pool B, ending their hopes of reaching the World Cup in France.

=== 2010–present ===
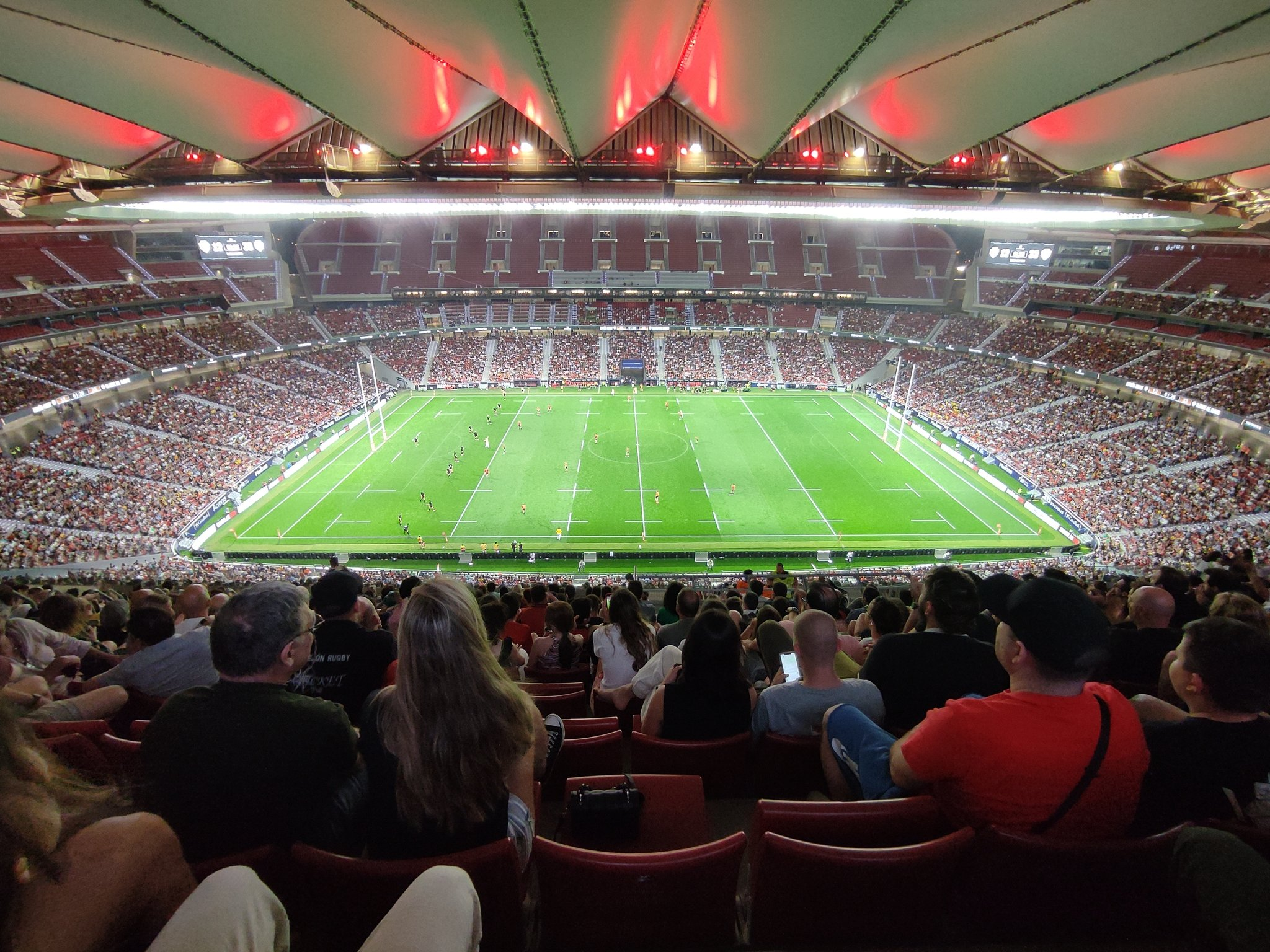
Spain playing Classic All Blacks at Metropolitano Stadium in 2022.

Spain missed the qualification for the 2011 Rugby World Cup in New Zealand, this time struggling through their fixtures. They lost 8 of their 10 fixtures, beating only Germany those two times, and missed out on advancing to the next round of qualifying.

Spain entered the top 20 in the IRB ranking in February 2013 for the first time following a 25–18 win over the higher ranked Georgia making headlines with semi-pro back Jack Rowland making a surprising call up, due to both fly-half and first team inside center pulling out with injury moments before the squad was announces. Rowland a last moment replacement scoring 12 out of the 25 points on his international debut. Surprising ranked Georgia first time in 29 years with a victory. Spain remained in the top 20 throughout the year, ending 2013 ranked 19th. Despite this, the 2015 campaign was similarly disastrous, winning only two of their games as well as two draws. This led to a restructure of the makeup and strategies of the FER. Spain has recently participated in the World Rugby Nations Cup and the 2014 IRB Tbilisi Cup.

The 2019 qualifying saw the team markedly improve; in 2017 they beat Germany, Russia and Belgium, and lost narrowly to Romania away from home. The Spaniards started 2018 with great fortune, as they defeated Russia on their home soil for the first time since 2002, and defeated Romania for the first time since 2012. With both of these victories, Spain led their qualifying group and looked set for a possible qualification at the 2019 Rugby World Cup, but a defeat at Belgium in the last round, and a heavy deduction of points because of fielding of ineligible players, ended their hopes.

A similar outcome occurred in 2022 when the team initially qualified for the 2023 Rugby World Cup after wins over direct rivals Romania and Portugal, but was later disqualified due to fielding a player who didn't meet the selection criteria. This second expulsion resulted in many veteran players abandoning the national team and the Spanish side struggled to get good results in the 2023 rugby championship campaign. With heavy defeats against Georgia and Portugal and a narrow home defeat to Romania.

After a win over Switzerland on 9 February 2025 in the Rugby Europe championship, Spain qualified for the 2027 Men's Rugby World Cup.

== Kits ==
Historically, Spain's kit reflected the colours of Spain; a red jersey with blue shorts deriving from the House of Bourbon. The current home kit consists of a red shirt with a triangular pattern and black on the waist sides, dark blue shorts and dark blue socks, while the away kit consists of a dark blue jersey, red waist sides, dark blue shorts and dark blue socks; previously, during the 1980s and 1990s, the Spanish team wore a yellow top as away kit.

In 2013, it was announced that O'Neills, one of Ireland's most notable sporting brands, would be providing the new kits for Spain. This partnership is expected to last for the rest of the decade. The team has been previously sponsored by Iberia and Renfe, and previous kit providers include Canterbury, Westport, Viator, Kondy Sport and Puma.

Currently, the kits are provided by Joma since 2016. Since 2017, Generali is the current sponsor.

=== Kit suppliers ===
Period	Kit manufacturer	Main shirt sponsor
1987-1990	Puma	
1992-1993	Kondy Sport	
1994-1996	Viator	
1997-2009	Westport	Iberia (2001), Renfe (2005)
2009-2013	Canterbury	Renfe
2013-2015	O'Neills	
2016-	Joma	Assicurazioni Generali

=== Kit evolution ===
RWC 1999	2005	2009	2013	2015	2017	2019	2025

== Record ==
=== European Nations Cup & FIRA Trophy ===
FIRA Nations Cup (1965 – 1973)
Nation	Games				Points			Table points	Champs
Nation	played	won	drawn	lost	for	against	diff	Table points	Champs
France	26	25	0	1	824	198	+626	65	7
Romania	26	17	1	8	528	222	+306	51	1
Czechoslovakia	17	2	2	13	135	411	–267	16	0
Morocco	9	2	0	7	65	332	–267	13	0
Italy	13	4	1	8	86	227	–141	12	0
West Germany	10	1	1	8	81	132	–51	6	0
Spain	3	1	0	2	56	55	+1	5	0
Poland	3	0	0	3	19	132	–113	3	0
Portugal	3	0	0	3	23	108	–85	0	0

Season	Division	Games	Won	Drew	Lost	PF	PA	Points	Position
2000	1	5	2	0	3	109	105	9	4th
2001–02	1	10	3	0	7	246	247	16	4th
2003–04	1	10	0	1	9	129	335	11	6th
2004–06	2	8	7	1	0	364	87	23	1st
2007–08	1	10	4	0	6	233	240	18	4th
2008–10	1	10	2	0	8	145	304	14	5th
2010–12	1A	10	5	0	5	225	275	26	3rd
2012–14	1A	10	2	2	6	159	243	15	4th
2014–16	1A	10	4	1	5	232	207	23	4th
2017	1	5	3	0	2	91	54	13	3rd
2018	1	5	3	0	2	147	66	13	3rd
2019	1	5	4	0	1	127	75	18	2nd
2020	1	5	3	0	2	103	93	13	2nd
2021	1	5	2	0	3	164	109	12	4th
2022	1	5	4	0	1	170	135	17	2nd
2023	1	5	2	0	3	98	133	9	4th
2024	1	5	3	0	2	120	127	9	3rd
2025	1	5	3	0	2	198	176	10	2nd

Note: Green signifies promotion; red signifies relegation. Italic signifies current competition.

=== World Rugby Nations Cup ===
Season	Position	Games	Won	Drew	Lost
2026	TBD	3	1	1	1

=== Rugby World Cup record ===
Rugby World Cup record									Qualification						
Year	Round	Pld	W	D	L	PF	PA	Squad	Pos	Pld	W	D	L	PF	PA
(New Zealand) (Australia) 1987	Not invited								–						
(England) (France) (Ireland) (Scotland) (Wales) 1991	Did not qualify								3rd	6	4	0	2	144	91
(South Africa) 1995	Did not qualify								2nd	5	4	0	1	179	94
(Wales) 1999	Pool stage	3	0	0	3	18	122	Squad	2nd	6	5	0	1	182	144
(Australia) 2003	Did not qualify								P/O	9	3	0	6	158	359
(France) 2007	Did not qualify								3rd	14	11	1	2	528	224
(New Zealand) 2011	Did not qualify								5th	10	2	0	8	145	304
(England) 2015	Did not qualify								4th	10	2	2	6	159	243
(Japan) 2019	Expelled from competing at tournament after qualification								4th	8	6	0	2	217	85
(France) 2023	Expelled from competing at tournament after qualification								4th	10	6	0	4	334	244
(Australia) 2027	Qualified								2nd	3	2	0	1	128	99
(United States) 2031	To be determined								To be determined						
Total	—	3	0	0	3	18	122	—	—	81	45	3	33	2174	1887
Champions; Runners–up; Third place; Fourth place; Home venue

=== Overall ===
Men's World Rugby Rankings Top 20 as of 16 November 2026
Rank	Change (Note: Change from the previous week)	Team	Points
1	Steady	South Africa	91.53
2	Steady	New Zealand	90.65
3	▲1	France	89.05
4	▼1	Ireland	88.70
5	Steady	England	86.99
6	Steady	Scotland	85.28
7	Steady	Australia	82.24
8	Steady	Argentina	82.09
9	▲1	Wales	79.37
10	▼1	Fiji	77.79
11	Steady	Italy	75.84
12	Steady	Japan	75.25
13	Steady	Georgia	74.23
14	▲1	United States	68.39
15	▼1	Portugal	68.24
16	▲3	Samoa	67.60
17	▲1	Chile	67.00
18	▼2	Spain	66.53
19	▼2	Tonga	65.58
20	Steady	Uruguay	65.17

Spain's historical rankings

Source: World Rugby
Graph updated to 16 November 2026

Below is a table of the representative rugby matches played by a Spain national XV at test level up until 15 March 2026, updated after match with Romania.

Opponent	Played	Won	Lost	Drawn	Win %	For	Aga	Diff
Andorra	3	3	0	0	100%	129	3	+126
Argentina	5	0	5	0	0.00%	78	211	–133
Argentina XV	2	0	2	0	0.00%	13	81	–68
Argentina Jaguars	1	0	1	0	0.00%	7	41	–34
Australia	1	0	1	0	0.00%	10	92	–82
Australia A	1	0	1	0	0.00%	3	36	–33
Barbarians	1	0	1	0	0.00%	26	52	–26
Basque Country	2	1	1	0	50%	47	47	0
Belgium	17	14	2	1	82.35%	484	123	+361
Canada	5	3	2	0	60%	172	174	–2
Chile	5	3	2	0	60%	151	86	+65
Croatia	2	1	0	1	50%	84	35	+49
Czech Republic	8	6	2	0	75%	340	116	+224
Czechoslovakia	5	2	2	1	40%	69	63	+6
Denmark	1	1	0	0	100%	53	13	+40
England A	2	0	2	0	0.00%	42	115	–73
England U23	2	0	2	0	0.00%	19	31	–12
Fiji	4	0	4	0	0.00%	85	156	–71
France XV	24	1	23	0	4.17%	283	1,075	–792
(France) French Military	4	1	2	1	25%	34	52	–18
Georgia	28	3	24	1	10.71%	430	940	–510
Germany	15	11	3	1	73.33%	418	198	+220
Hong Kong	1	1	0	0	100%	29	7	+22
Hungary	1	1	0	0	100%	63	9	+54
Ireland Wolfhounds	1	0	1	0	0%	24	61	–37
Italy	27	3	23	1	11.11%	187	581	–394
Emerging Italy	1	0	1	0	0.00%	0	37	–37
Italy A	1	0	1	0	0%	11	13	–2
Japan	3	0	3	0	0.00%	43	114	–71
Kenya	1	0	1	0	0.00%	27	36	–9
Moldova	1	1	0	0	100%	40	7	+33
Morocco	18	13	5	0	72.22%	332	142	+190
Namibia	7	5	2	0	71.43%	174	134	+40
Netherlands	20	19	0	1	95%	641	209	+432
New Zealand Māori	2	0	2	0	0.00%	15	88	–73
New Zealand Classic	1	0	1	0	0.00%	26	33	–7
Poland	16	10	6	0	62.5%	320	207	+113
Portugal	43	27	14	2	62.79%	944	723	+221
Romania	41	6	35	0	14.63%	511	1,171	–660
Royal Air Force	4	0	2	2	0.00%	26	59	–33
Russia	24	8	16	0	33.33%	592	674	–82
Samoa	2	0	2	0	0%	40	62	–22
Scotland	1	0	1	0	0.00%	0	48	–48
Scotland XV	4	0	4	0	0.00%	34	211	–177
Scotland A	1	0	1	0	0.00%	7	39	–32
Slovenia	1	1	0	0	100%	76	6	+70
South Africa	1	0	1	0	0.00%	3	47	–44
Soviet Union	7	0	7	0	0.00%	60	152	–92
Sweden	2	2	0	0	100%	58	30	+28
Switzerland	3	3	0	0	100%	136	27	+109
Tonga	3	1	2	0	33.33%	48	88	–40
Tunisia	5	4	1	0	80%	141	51	+90
Ukraine	2	2	0	0	100%	76	19	+57
United States	5	1	4	0	20%	72	231	–159
Uruguay	15	8	7	0	53.33%	272	295	–23
Wales	1	0	1	0	0.00%	0	54	–54
Wales XV	1	0	1	0	0.00%	16	65	–49
West Germany	10	4	5	1	40%	137	96	+41
Yugoslavia	4	4	0	0	100%	86	17	+69
Zimbabwe	7	5	2	0	71.43%	153	108	+45
Total	423	178	234	13	42.08%	8,397	9,691	–1,294

== Players ==
=== Current squad ===
On 27 October, Spain named a 43-player squad ahead of the 2026 World Rugby Nations Cup European-African-Asian Series.

Head Coach: (Argentina) Pablo Bouza

- Caps Updated: 14 November 2026 (after Spain v Chile)

Player	Position	Date of birth (age)	Caps	Club/province
Álvaro García	Hooker	23 August 2003 (age 23)	23	(France) Stade Français
Diego González	Hooker	17 June 2004 (age 22)	4	(Spain) El Salvador
Santiago Ovejero	Hooker	11 December 1991 (age 34)	32	(Spain) Aparejadores
Aristot Benz-Salomon	Prop	17 March 2001 (age 25)	0	(England) Coventry
Jono Benz-Salomon	Prop	17 March 2001 (age 25)	0	(England) Coventry
Raúl Calzón	Prop	16 June 1997 (age 29)	8	(Spain) Valladolid
Thierry Futeu	Prop	23 June 1995 (age 31)	47	(France) Carcassonne
Joel Merkler	Prop	25 October 2001 (age 25)	13	(France) Toulouse
Hugo Pirlet	Prop	2 October 1996 (age 30)	13	(France) Biarritz
Guido Reyes	Prop	18 July 2005 (age 21)	1	(France) Mont-de-Marsan
Lucas Santamaría	Prop	17 January 2000 (age 26)	22	(Spain) Liceo Francés
Luca Tabarot	Prop	24 December 2003 (age 22)	6	(France) Agen
Jon Zabala	Prop	27 November 1996 (age 29)	37	(France) Pau
Matthew Foulds	Lock	27 April 1991 (age 35)	46	(Spain) Santboiana
Pablo Guirao	Lock	10 November 2004 (age 22)	4	(Spain) Alcobendas
Gauthier Maravat	Lock	11 June 2000 (age 26)	1	(France) Castres
Ignacio Piñeiro	Lock	4 January 2003 (age 23)	26	(Spain) Liceo Francés
Antonio Suárez	Lock	4 September 2003 (age 23)	6	(Spain) Alcobendas
Imanol Urraza	Lock	5 April 2002 (age 24)	15	(Spain) Aparejadores
Manex Ariceta	Back row	20 March 2004 (age 22)	14	(France) Bayonne
Vicente Boronat	Back row	15 August 1997 (age 29)	18	(Spain) Aparejadores
Ekain Imaz	Back row	12 July 2002 (age 24)	20	(France) Biarritz
Raphael Nieto	Back row	27 August 2000 (age 26)	19	(France) Massy
Mario Pichardie	Back row	31 January 2001 (age 25)	21	(France) Bourgoin-Jallieu
Valentino Rizzo	Back row	20 December 2004 (age 21)	0	(Spain) Cisneros
Álex Saleta	Back row	8 June 2001 (age 25)	13	(Spain) Valladolid
Matheo Triki	Back row	2 February 2001 (age 25)	14	(Spain) El Salvador
Gabriel Vélez	Back row	10 July 1997 (age 29)	4	(Spain) Valladolid
Kerman Aurrekoetxea	Scrum-half	4 May 2000 (age 26)	24	(France) Biarritz
Estanislao Bay	Scrum-half	18 November 1992 (age 33)	37	(Spain) Seville
Nico Infer	Scrum-half	26 September 2005 (age 21)	3	(Spain) Cisneros
Pablo Pérez	Scrum-half	10 June 2003 (age 23)	3	(Spain) Aparejadores
Bautista Güemes	Fly-half	12 May 1990 (age 36)	29	(Spain) Les Abelles
Gonzalo López-Bontempo	Fly-half	10 February 2000 (age 26)	21	(France) Massy
Lucien Richardis	Fly-half	28 March 2005 (age 21)	6	(France) Agen
Yago Fernández	Centre	8 January 2004 (age 22)	3	(Spain) Alcobendas
Álvar Gimeno	Centre	15 December 1997 (age 28)	55	(Spain) Valencia
Oriol Marsinyac	Centre	7 June 2007 (age 19)	2	(France) Toulouse
Iñaki Mateu	Centre	13 March 1997 (age 29)	39	(Spain) Alcobendas
Pau Aira	Wing	3 July 2001 (age 25)	14	(Spain) Barcelona
Alberto Carmona	Wing	13 March 2005 (age 21)	24	(France) Colomiers
Martiniano Cian	Wing	15 August 2001 (age 25)	29	(Spain) Valladolid
Alejandro Laforga	Wing	29 August 1999 (age 27)	7	(Spain) Cisneros
Gauthier Minguillon	Wing	3 March 1994 (age 32)	32	(Spain) El Salvador
Beltrán Ortega	Wing	13 January 2005 (age 21)	1	(Spain) Valladolid
JW Bell	Fullback	18 January 1990 (age 36)	38	(South Africa) Pretoria Harlequins
Gonzalo Ballester	Fullback	7 January 2003 (age 23)	0	(Spain) Liceo Francés

=== Notable former players ===
- Pablo Feijoo (2002–2015) – 67 caps, 20 tries
- Cédric Garcia (2004) – 3 caps, played 12 seasons in the French Top 14
- Alberto Malo (1986–1999) – 89 caps
- Jaime Nava (2002–2018) – 79 caps
- Francisco Puertas Soto (1994–2001) – 93 caps
- Oriol Ripol (1998–2002) – 17 caps, played 8 seasons in English Premiership
- Esteban Roqué Segovia (2004–2007) – 22 caps, 285 points
- César Sempere (2004–2014) – 56 caps, 31 tries, 177 points
- Diego Zarzosa (1998–2009) – 46 caps

== Coaches ==
=== Current coaching staff ===
Correct as of 27 October 2026

Position	Name
Head coach	(Argentina) Pablo Bouza
Forwards coach	(Spain) Miguel Velasco
Backs coach	(Argentina) Valentin Telleriarte
Scrum coach	(Uruguay) Oscar Durán
Skills coach	(Spain) Pedro de Matías
Skills coach	(Australia) James Kent

=== Coaching history ===
Coach	Years
(Spain) Enrique Gutiérrez	1927–1928
(Spain) Manuel Ordóñez	1931–1932
(Spain) José Hermosa	1935–1936
(Spain) César Palomino	1936
(Spain) Jesús Luque	1952–1953
(Spain) Juan Vázquez	1953–1960
(Spain) Arnaldo Griñó	1960–1966
(Spain) Ramón Rabassa	1965 (caretaker)
(Spain) Alberto Serena	1967–1968
(Spain) Alfredo Calzada	1968–1970
(France) Gérard Murillo	1970–1978
(Wales) Morgan Thomas	1978–1979
(Spain) Luis Mocoroa	1979 (caretaker)
(Spain) Francisco Sacristán	1979–1982
(Spain) Jesús Linares	1982–1984
(Spain) Ángel Luis Jiménez	1984–1986
(Spain) José Maria Epalza	1986–1989
(France) Gérard Murillo	1989–1993
(Spain) Alfonso Feijoo	1992 (caretaker)
(New Zealand) Bryce Bevin	1993–1997
(Spain) Alfonso Feijoo	1997–1999
(Spain) Tomás García	1999–2002
(France) Pierre Pérez	2002–2003
(England) Gerard Glynn	2003–2010
(France) Régis Sonnes	2010–2012
(Spain) Francisco Puertas	2012–2021
(Spain) Santiago Santos	2021–2023

== See also ==
- Spain national rugby sevens team
- Spain national under-20 rugby union team
- Spain women's national rugby union team
- Spain women's national rugby sevens team
- Rugby union in Spain
