= 2014–15 División de Honor de Rugby =

Spanish rugby union competition

2014–15 División de Honor
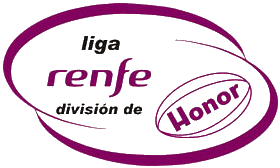
- Countries: Spain
- Date: 13 September 2014 – 3 May 2015 (regular season); 17 May 2015 – (championship playoff)
- Champions: Valladolid
- Runners-up: Santboiana
- Relegated: Vigo RC
- Matches played: 137
- Tries scored: 820 (average 6 per match)
- Top point scorer: Samuel Katz, 265
- Top try scorer: Falemaka Tatafu, 20

The 2014–15 División de Honor was the 48th season of the top flight of the Spanish domestic rugby union competition since its inception in 1953. Regular season began on 13 September 2014 and finished on 3 May 2015.

The playoffs began on 17 May finishing with the Final taking place on 31 May.

Valladolid were the defending champions and won their sixth title after defeating UE Santboiana 19–8 in the Final.

== Competition format ==
The season took place between September and March, with every team playing each other home and away for a total of 22 matches. Points were awarded according to the following:

- 4 points for a win
- 2 points for a draw
- 1 bonus point for a team scoring 4 tries or more in a match
- 1 bonus point for a team that loses a match by 7 points or fewer

The six teams with the highest number of points at the end of 22 rounds of matches played the championship playoffs. The top two teams win a semifinal berth automatically, while the next four teams played off to take the remaining two spots.

The club which finished bottom was relegated, while the club that finished 11th went into a playoff with a team from División de Honor B.

=== Promotion and relegation ===
The bottom team in the standings was relegated to División de Honor B, while the team finishing 11th played the relegation playoff. The top team from División de Honor B was promoted to División de Honor.

== Teams ==
| Team | Stadium | Capacity | Location | |
|---|---|---|---|---|
| Barcelona | La Teixonera | 500 | Barcelona | 2014–15 División de Honor teams |
| Bizkaia Gernika | Urbieta | 2,500 | Gernika, Bizkaia | 2014–15 División de Honor teams |
| CR Complutense Cisneros | Estadio Complutense | 12,400 | Madrid | 2014–15 División de Honor teams |
| El Salvador | Pepe Rojo | 5,000 | Valladolid | 2014–15 División de Honor teams |
| Getxo Artea R.T. | Fadura | 1000 | Guecho | 2014–15 División de Honor teams |
| Hernani | Landare Toki | 500 | Hernani, Gipuzkoa | 2014–15 División de Honor teams |
| Independiente RC | San Román | 1,500 | Santander, Cantabria | 2014–15 División de Honor teams |
| Ordizia | Altamira | 500 | Ordizia, Gipuzkoa | 2014–15 División de Honor teams |
| Pozuelo | Valle de las Cañas | 300 | Pozuelo de Alarcón, Madrid | 2014–15 División de Honor teams |
| Santboiana | Baldiri Aleu | 4,000 | Sant Boi de Llobregat | 2014–15 División de Honor teams |
| Universidade Vigo | Lagoas-Marcosende | 3,000 | Vigo | 2014–15 División de Honor teams |
| Valladolid RAC | Pepe Rojo | 5,000 | Valladolid | 2014–15 División de Honor teams |

== Results ==
| | BAR | CIS | ELS | GER | GET | HER | IND | ORD | POZ | SAN | VAL | VIG |
| Barcelona | | 33-38 | 17-18 | 27-20 | 43-25 | 32-5 | 36-58 | 17-23 | 13-13 | 9-17 | 31-33 | 43-24 |
| Cisneros | 35-14 | | 22-17 | 49-7 | 29-13 | 40-15 | 22-21 | 69-8 | 32-23 | 29-37 | 26-37 | 42-19 |
| El Salvador | 40-7 | 26-18 | | 29-22 | 42-7 | 45-8 | 21-9 | 22-26 | 30-0 | 36-3 | 21-22 | 47-0 |
| Gernika RT | 32-18 | 27-40 | 30-20 | | 19-16 | 10-11 | 17-11 | 19-7 | 34-0 | 24-26 | 10-21 | 38-31 |
| Getxo | 26-23 | 10-29 | 25-35 | 48-16 | | 39-15 | 22-18 | 27-7 | 14-15 | 19-25 | 13-31 | 32-17 |
| Hernani | 35-14 | 7-11 | 3-10 | 14-19 | 17-13 | | 27-38 | 26-12 | 16-17 | 0-38 | 21-29 | 35-15 |
| Independiente | 43-30 | 44-19 | 28-22 | 24-15 | 35-10 | 46-31 | | 15-5 | 32-20 | 18-37 | 23-21 | 20-14 |
| Ordizia | 18-3 | 19-37 | 25-17 | 39-20 | 36-12 | 28-35 | 17-26 | | 48-10 | 26-33 | 28-34 | 51-5 |
| Pozuelo | 18-16 | 9-34 | 10-36 | 23-26 | 25-30 | 21-18 | 12-14 | 29-20 | | 24-28 | 3-26 | 35-19 |
| Santboiana | 32-13 | 31-25 | 36-22 | 63-24 | 61-10 | 50-10 | 21-30 | 36-28 | 29-13 | | 19-16 | 68-7 |
| Valladolid | 40-13 | 27-18 | 22-23 | 35-19 | 56-7 | 44-20 | 40-29 | 32-14 | 31-20 | 18-14 | | 47-7 |
| Vigo | 22-20 | 0-38 | 17-38 | 20-20 | 42-22 | 27-5 | 26-33 | 10-22 | 12-13 | 27-53 | 15-19 | |

== Table ==
| # | Team | Games | | | | Points | | | Tries | | | Bon | Pts |
| # | Team | P | W | D | L | F | A | +/- | F | A | +/- | Bon | Pts |
|---|---|---|---|---|---|---|---|---|---|---|---|---|---|
| 1 | Valladolid | 22 | 19 | 0 | 3 | 681 | 394 | +287 | 91 | 44 | +47 | 18 | 94 |
| 2 | Santboiana | 22 | 19 | 0 | 3 | 757 | 428 | +329 | 102 | 59 | +43 | 15 | 91 |
| 3 | Complutense Cisneros | 22 | 16 | 0 | 6 | 702 | 444 | +258 | 96 | 54 | +42 | 17 | 81 |
| 4 | Independiente RC | 22 | 16 | 0 | 6 | 615 | 485 | +130 | 74 | 62 | +12 | 13 | 77 |
| 5 | El Salvador | 22 | 15 | 0 | 7 | 617 | 357 | +260 | 70 | 42 | +28 | 13 | 73 |
| 6 | Bizkaia Gernika | 22 | 9 | 1 | 12 | 468 | 572 | −104 | 69 | 69 | 0 | 11 | 49 |
| 7 | Ordizia | 22 | 9 | 0 | 13 | 507 | 534 | −27 | 60 | 68 | −8 | 9 | 45 |
| 8 | Pozuelo | 22 | 7 | 1 | 14 | 353 | 558 | −205 | 42 | 72 | −30 | 7 | 37 |
| 9 | Getxo Artea | 22 | 7 | 0 | 15 | 440 | 636 | −196 | 54 | 91 | −37 | 8 | 36 |
| 10 | Hernani | 22 | 6 | 0 | 16 | 374 | 598 | −224 | 51 | 78 | −27 | 9 | 33 |
| 11 | Barcelona | 22 | 4 | 1 | 17 | 472 | 615 | −143 | 52 | 79 | −27 | 13 | 31 |
| 12 | Universidade Vigo | 22 | 3 | 1 | 18 | 376 | 741 | −365 | 59 | 102 | −43 | 11 | 25 |
Source: División de Honor Table (accessed 3 May 2015)

| Qualified for Playoff (semifinals) |
| Qualified for Playoff (quarter-finals) |
| Relegation playoff |
| Relegated |

== Championship playoffs ==
=== Bracket ===
Quarter-finals
4 | (Cantabria) Independiente | 14
5 | (Castile and León) El Salvador | 16
3 | (Community of Madrid) Complutense Cisneros | 52
6 | (Basque Country (autonomous community)) Bizkaia Gernika | 19

Semi-finals
1 | (Castile and León) Valladolid | 27
5 | (Castile and León) El Salvador | 10
2 | (Catalonia) UE Santboiana | 29
3 | (Community of Madrid) Complutense Cisneros | 13

Final
1 | (Castile and León) Valladolid | 19
2 | (Catalonia) UE Santboiana | 8

=== Quarter-finals ===
| May 17, 2015 | Independiente RC | 14–16 | El Salvador | San Román, Santander |
| 12:30 (UTC+2) | Try: Penalty try 33' c Blanco 51' c Con: García (2/2) 33', 51' | Report | Try: Blanco 18' c Con: Katz (1/1) 19'; Pen: Katz (3/3) 8', 13', 60' | Referee: Pedro Montoya (Basque Country) |

| May 17, 2015 | Complutense Cisneros | 52–19 | Bizkaia Gernika | Campo Central, Madrid |
| 14:00 (UTC+2) | Try: Norton 20' c, 23' c, 39' c Boccardo 35' c Villanueva 44'; Carreras 53' c Sainz-Trápaga 59'; Hernández 69' c Con: Norton (4/5) 20', 24', 36', 40'; Tudela (2/3) 54', 70' | Report | Try: Etxaniz 29' c Magunazelaia 49' c Wiedemann 79'; Con: Casteglioni (2/3) 30', 50' | Referee: Jorge Molpeceres (Castille and León) |

=== Semifinals ===
| May 23, 2015 | Valladolid | 27–10 | El Salvador | Pepe Rojo, Valladolid |
| 18:00 (UTC+2) | Try: Snee 17' c Mateu 27' c Griffiths 40' c Con: Griffiths (3/3) 17', 27', 40'; Pen: Griffiths (2/2) 67', 77' | Report | Try: Casado 11' c Con: Katz (1/1) 11'; Pen: Katz (1/1) 5' | Referee: Alfonso Mirat (Madrid) |

| May 24, 2015 | Santboiana | 29–13 | Complutense Cisneros | Baldiri Aleu, Sant Boi de Llobregat |
| 12:30 (UTC+2) | Try: García 5'; Tauli 34', 68'; Sanz 66'; Pen: Anufe (3/3) 11', 59', 61' | Report | Try: Villanueva 74' c Con: Tudela (1/1) 74'; Pen: Tudela (2/2) 39', 41' | Referee: Igotz Gallastegi (Basque Country) |

==== Final ====
| May 31, 2015 | Valladolid | 19–8 | Santboiana | Pepe Rojo, Valladolid |
| 12:30 (UTC+2) | Try: Miejimolle 4' c Con: Griffiths (1/1) 4'; Pen: Griffiths (4/4) 25', 31', 54', 62' | Report | Con: Sanz 79'; Pen: Baró (1/1) 47' | Referee: Alhambra Nievas (Andalusia) |

2014–15 División de Honor winners
(Castile and León)
Valladolid
Sixth title

== Relegation playoff ==
The relegation playoff was contested over two legs by FC Barcelona, who finished 11th in División de Honor, and their neighbours Sant Cugat, the losing team from División de Honor B promotion playoff final. Barcelona won the tie, winning 39-26 on aggregate.

| Relegation/promotion playoff |
| 11th | (Catalonia) FC Barcelona | 17 | 22 | 39 |
| DHB | (Catalonia) Sant Cugat | 13 | 13 | 26 |

=== 1st leg ===
| May 30, 2015 | San Cugat | 13–17 | FC Barcelona | La Guinardera, Sant Cugat del Vallès |
| 16:30 (UTC+2) | Try: Raya 46' c Con: Louteiro (1/1) 46'; Pen: Louteiro (1/1) 65'; Drop: Berasategui (1/1) 41' | Report | Try: Martínez 4' c Cabeza 60' c Con: Martínez (2/2) 4', 60'; Pen: Martínez (1/1) 33' | Referee: Declan Lane (Australia) |

=== 2nd leg ===
| June 6, 2015 | FC Barcelona | 22–13 | San Cugat | La Teixonera, Barcelona |
| 16:30 (UTC+2) | Try: Montes 8'; Fuertes 40' c Pinto 44' c Con: Martínez (1/2) 40'; Belda (1/1) 44'; Pen: Belda (1/1) 64' | Report | Try: Granell 46' c Con: Louteiro (1/1) 46'; Pen: Serrano (1/1) 20'; Louteiro (1/1) 51' | Referee: Igotz Gallastegi (Basque Country) |

FC Barcelona won 39–26 on aggregate and remained in División de Honor for 2015–16 season.

== Scorers statistics ==
=== Top try scorers ===
| Rank | Player | Tries | Team |
|---|---|---|---|
| 1 | (Tonga) Falemaka Tatafu | 20 | Universidade Vigo |
| 2 | (New Zealand) Afaese Tauli | 17 | Santboiana |
| 3 | (Spain) Nil Baró | 16 | Santboiana |
| 4 | (Spain) Joan Losada | 15 | FC Barcelona |
| 5 | (Spain) José Luis del Valle | 14 | Complutense Cisneros |
| 6 | (Australia) Liam Windon | 13 | Getxo Artea |
| 6 | (New Zealand) Phillip Huxford | 13 | Ordizia |
| 8 | (Spain) Iñigo Olaeta | 12 | Bizkaia Gernika |
| 9 | (South Africa) Mpho Mbiyozo | 10 | Universidade Vigo |
| 10 | (New Zealand) Leigh Thompson | 9 | Valladolid |
| 10 | (Spain) Alejandro Sánchez | 9 | El Salvador |
| 10 | (Spain) Federico González | 9 | Santboiana |

=== Top points scorers ===
| Rank | Player | Points | Team |
|---|---|---|---|
| 1 | (England) Sam Katz | 296 | El Salvador |
| 2 | (Australia) Danny Kroll | 216 | Ordizia |
| 3 | (Spain) Rafael Staat | 201 | FC Barcelona |
| 4 | (Spain) Miguel Jiménez | 185 | Complutense Cisneros |
| 5 | (Tonga) Fangatapu Apikotoa | 177 | Santboiana |
| 6 | (Spain) Mariano García | 170 | Independiente RC |
| 7 | (England) Gareth Griffiths | 144 | Valladolid |
| 8 | (New Zealand) Brad Linklater | 137 | Independiente RC |
| 9 | (Spain) Igor Genua | 124 | Hernani |
| 10 | (Australia) Liam Windon | 109 | Getxo Artea |

== See also ==
- 2014–15 División de Honor B de Rugby
