= 2011–12 División de Honor de Rugby =

Spanish rugby union competition

2011–12 División de Honor
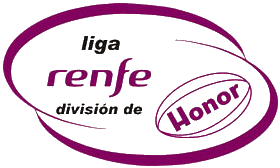
- Countries: Spain
- Champions: Valladolid
- Runners-up: Ordizia
- Relegated: Alcobendas
- Matches played: 90
- Tries scored: 600 (average 6.7 per match)
- Top point scorer: Daniel Waenga, 221
- Top try scorer: Julen Goia, 17

The 2011–12 División de Honor was the 45th season of the top flight of the Spanish domestic rugby union competitions since 1953. It began in autumn 2011 and finished on May 12 with the Final. Valladolid won the title, while Alcobendas were relegated to División de Honor B.

== Competition format ==
The season took place between September and March, with every team playing each other home and away for a total of 18 matches. Points were awarded according to the following:

- 4 points for a win
- 2 points for a draw
- 1 bonus point for a team scoring 4 tries or more in a match
- 1 bonus point for a team that loses a match by 7 points or fewer

The six teams with the highest number of points at the end of 22 rounds of matches played the championship playoffs. The top two teams win a semifinal berth automatically, while the next four teams played off to take the remaining two spots.

The club which finished bottom went into a playoff with a team from División de Honor B. Up to three teams would be promoted in order to increase the number of teams in the División de Honor to 12.

== Teams ==
Team	Stadium	Capacity	Location	
Alcobendas	Las Terrazas	500	Alcobendas, Community of Madrid	2011–12 División de Honor teams
Bizkaia Gernika	Urbieta	2,500	Guernica, Biscay	2011–12 División de Honor teams
Ciencias	Olímpico La Cartuja	5,000	Seville	2011–12 División de Honor teams
Getxo Artea	Fadura	500	Getxo	2011–12 División de Honor teams
El Salvador	Pepe Rojo	5,000	Valladolid	2011–12 División de Honor teams
La Vila	El Pantano	1,550	Villajoyosa, Alicante	2011–12 División de Honor teams
Ordizia	Altamira	500	Ordizia, Gipuzkoa	2011–12 División de Honor teams
Santboiana	Baldiri Aleu	4,000	Sant Boi de Llobregat	2011–12 División de Honor teams
Universidade Vigo	Lagoas-Marcosende	3,000	Vigo	2011–12 División de Honor teams
Valladolid	Pepe Rojo	5,000	Valladolid	2011–12 División de Honor teams

== Regular season standings ==
	Team	P	W	D	L	F	A	+/-	TF	TA	Bon	Pts
1	Valladolid	18	15	0	3	589	374	215	74	44	11	71
2	Ordizia	18	13	1	4	543	384	159	66	46	11	65
3	Santboiana	18	13	0	5	536	348	188	67	42	12	64
4	La Vila	18	10	2	6	450	442	8	54	48	9	53
5	Bizkaia Gernika	18	9	0	9	431	388	43	47	59	11	47
6	Getxo Artea	18	9	2	7	406	409	−3	56	47	7	47
7	El Salvador	18	9	0	9	469	472	−3	62	62	9	45
8	Ciencias	18	5	0	13	353	503	−150	49	65	11	31
9	Universidade de Vigo	18	2	0	16	353	543	−190	49	75	14	22
10	Alcobendas	18	2	1	15	325	592	−267	44	80	8	18

Source: Federación Española de Rugby

Qualified for championship playoff semi-finals
Qualified for championship playoff quarter-finals
Relegation playoff

== Championship playoffs ==
=== Bracket ===
Quarter-finals
3	(Catalonia) Santboiana	14
6	(Basque Country (autonomous community)) Bizkaia Gernika	18
4	(Valencian Community) La Vila	3
5	(Basque Country (autonomous community)) Getxo Artea	33

Semi-finals
1	(Castile and León) Valladolid	55
6	(Basque Country (autonomous community)) Bizkaia Gernika	25
2	(Basque Country (autonomous community)) Ordizia	38
5	(Basque Country (autonomous community)) Getxo Artea	22

Final
1	(Castile and León) Valladolid	27
2	(Basque Country (autonomous community)) Ordizia	10

2011–12 División de Honor winners
(Castile and León)
Valladolid
Third title

==== Quarter-finals ====
April 29, 2012	Santboiana	14 – 18	Bizkaia Gernika	Baldiri Aleu, Sant Boi de Llobregat
12:00 UTC+2	Try: Severino, 75'; Pen: Palau, 4', 31', 62'	Report	Try: Olaeta, 13'; Montagut, 34'; Con: Swartbooi, 34'; Pen: Swartbooi, 17', 80'	Referee: Jorge Molpeceres

April 29, 2012	La Vila	3 – 33	Getxo Artea	Municipal, Villajoyosa
12:30 UTC+2	Pen: Sorribes, 31'	Report	Try: Aboitiz, 71'; Booiman, 74'; Bentall, 80'; Con: Linklater, 71', 80'; Pen: Linklater, 6', 10', 21', 75'	Referee: Félix Villegas

==== Semifinals ====
May 5, 2012	Valladolid	55 – 25	Getxo Artea	Pepe Rojo, Valladolid
18:00 UTC+2	Try: Newton, 4', 48'; Rolls, 11'; Montorfano, 19'; Waenga, 29', 79'; Nacho Gutiérrez, 69'; Juan Carlos Pico, 71'; Con: Waenga, 4', 11', 19', 48', 69'; Juan Carlos Pico, 79'; Pen: Waenga, 64'	Report	Try: Rodríguez, 40'; Brooks, 54'; Aboitz, 66'; Con: Linklater, 54', 66'; Pen: Linklater, 22', 25'	Referee: Sergio Figueruelo

May 6, 2012	Ordizia	38 – 22	Bizkaia Gernika	Altamira, Ordizia
12:30 UTC+2	Try: Goia, 3'; Huxford, 8', 10', 32', 76'; Kroll, 16'; Con: Kroll, 8', 16'; Simpson, 32', 76'	Report	Try: Ross, 21'; Swartbooi, 23'; García Parrado, 66'; Con: Swartbooi, 21', 23'; Pen: Swartbooi, 46'	Referee: Félix Villegas

==== Final ====
May 12, 2012	Valladolid	27 – 10	Ordizia	Pepe Rojo, Valladolid
18:00 UTC+2	Try: Waenga, 24', 55'; Nacho Gutiérrez, 32'; Molina, 64'; Álex Gutiérrez, 78'; Con: Waenga, 32'	Report	Try: Huxford, 50'; Con: Kroll, 50'; Pen: Kroll, 5'	Attendance: 6,000; Referee: Steve Lee (England)

=== Relegation playoff ===
The relegation playoff was contested over two legs by Alcobendas, who finished 10th in División de Honor, and Hernani, the losing team from División de Honor B promotion playoff final. Hernani won the tie, winning 27-24 on aggregate.

Relegation/promotion playoff
3rd	(Basque Country (autonomous community)) Hernani	19	8	27
10th	(Community of Madrid) Alcobendas	18	6	24

==== 1st leg ====
April 22, 2012	Hernani	19 – 18	Alcobendas	Landare Toki, Hernani
12:30 UTC+2	Try: Otaño, 55'; Con: Genua, 55'; Pen: Genua, 14', 35', 44', 49'	Report	Try: Montoliu, 4'; Bermejo, 65'; Con: Ati, 4', 65'; Pen: Ati, 18', 28'

==== 2nd leg ====
April 29, 2012	Alcobendas	6 – 8	Hernani	Las Terrazas, Alcobendas
12:30 UTC+2	Pen: Ati, 18', 26'	Report	Try: Genua, 37'; Pen: Genua, 9'

- Hernani promoted to División de Honor. Sanitas Alcobendas relegated to División de Honor B.

== Scorers statistics ==
=== By try points ===
Player	Try points	Team
(Spain) Julen Goia	80	Ordizia
(New Zealand) Josh Hamilton	75	Universidade Vigo
(South Africa) Ryan Le Loux	70	Santboiana
(Spain) Marcos Poggi	55	La Vila
(Spain) Pablo Feijoo	50	El Salvador
(New Zealand) Glen Rolls	50	Valladolid
(Argentina) Aníbal Bonan	45	Valladolid
(Spain) Jon Magunazelaia	40	Bizkaia Gernika
(Argentina) Santiago Fernández	40	Alcobendas
(Australia) Daniel Kroll	40	Ordizia

=== By total points ===
Player	Points	Team
(New Zealand) Daniel Waenga	221	Valladolid
(Australia) Daniel Kroll	215	Ordizia
(New Zealand) Isaac Thompson	187	Santboiana
(New Zealand) Brad Linklater	165	Getxo Artea
(New Zealand) Josh Hamilton	163	Universidad de Vigo
(Spain) Pedro Rodríguez	147	El Salvador
(South Africa) Marvin Swartbooi	147	Bizkaia Gernika
(Argentina) Santiago Fernández	126	Alcobendas
(Spain) Eduardo Sorribes	90	La Vila
(Spain) Julen Goia	85	Ordizia

== See also ==
- División de Honor B de Rugby
