= 2012–13 División de Honor de Rugby =

Spanish rugby union competition

2012–13 División de Honor
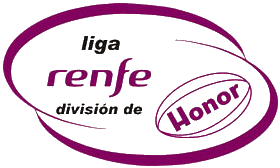
- Countries: Spain
- Champions: Valladolid
- Runners-up: Santboiana
- Relegated: La Vila
- Matches played: 137
- Top point scorer: Eduardo Sorribes, 190
- Top try scorer: Clinton Sills, 20

The 2012–13 División de Honor is the 46th season of the top flight of the Spanish domestic rugby union competition since its inception in 1953. Regular season began in September 2012 and finished on April 28, 2013.

The playoffs began on 19 May and the Final took place on 2 June.

Defending champions, Valladolid, successfully defended its previous season title after defeating Santboiana 27–25 in the championship final. La Vila was the relegated team to División de Honor B.

== Competition format ==
The season took place between September and March, with every team playing each other home and away for a total of 22 matches. Points were awarded according to the following:

- 4 points for a win
- 2 points for a draw
- 1 bonus point for a team scoring 4 tries or more in a match
- 1 bonus point for a team that loses a match by 7 points or fewer

The six teams with the highest number of points at the end of 22 rounds of matches played the championship playoffs. The top two teams win a semifinal berth automatically, while the next four teams played off to take the remaining two spots.

The club which finished bottom was relegated, while the club that finished 11th went into a playoff with a team from División de Honor B.

=== Promotion and relegation ===
The bottom team in the standings was relegated to División de Honor B, while the team finishing 11th played the relegation playoff. The top team from División de Honor B was promoted to División de Honor.

== Teams ==
The division was increased from 10 teams in the previous season to 12, with Atlético Madrid, Complutense Cisneros and Hernani gaining promotion from Division de Honor B, and only Alcobendas being relegated.

| Team | Stadium | Capacity | Location | |
|---|---|---|---|---|
| Atlético Madrid | Valle de las Cañas | 300 | Pozuelo de Alarcón | 2012–13 División de Honor teams |
| Bizkaia Gernika | Urbieta | 2,500 | Guernica, Biscay | 2012–13 División de Honor teams |
| Ciencias Sevilla | La Cartuja | 1,932 | Seville | 2012–13 División de Honor teams |
| Complutense Cisneros | Central de la Ciudad Universitaria | 12,400 | Madrid | 2012–13 División de Honor teams |
| El Salvador | Pepe Rojo | 5,000 | Valladolid | 2012–13 División de Honor teams |
| Getxo Artea | Fadura | 500 | Getxo | 2012–13 División de Honor teams |
| Hernani | Landare Toki | 500 | Hernani, Gipuzkoa | 2012–13 División de Honor teams |
| La Vila | El Pantano | 1,550 | Villajoyosa, Alicante | 2012–13 División de Honor teams |
| Ordizia | Altamira | 500 | Ordizia, Gipuzkoa | 2012–13 División de Honor teams |
| Santboiana | Baldiri Aleu | 4,000 | Sant Boi de Llobregat | 2012–13 División de Honor teams |
| Universidade Vigo | Lagoas-Marcosende | 3,000 | Vigo | 2012–13 División de Honor teams |
| Valladolid | Pepe Rojo | 5,000 | Valladolid | 2012–13 División de Honor teams |

== Regular season standings ==
| | Team | P | W | D | L | F | A | +/- | Bon | Pts |
|---|---|---|---|---|---|---|---|---|---|---|
| 1 | Valladolid | 22 | 17 | 0 | 5 | 680 | 412 | 268 | 17 | 85 |
| 2 | Santboiana | 22 | 16 | 2 | 4 | 638 | 407 | 231 | 13 | 81 |
| 3 | Bizkaia Gernika | 22 | 15 | 0 | 7 | 673 | 445 | 228 | 15 | 75 |
| 4 | El Salvador | 22 | 13 | 1 | 8 | 530 | 390 | 140 | 14 | 68 |
| 5 | Ordizia | 22 | 12 | 2 | 8 | 584 | 536 | 48 | 13 | 65 |
| 6 | Atlético Madrid | 22 | 12 | 2 | 8 | 491 | 495 | −4 | 8 | 60 |
| 7 | Ciencias | 22 | 8 | 0 | 14 | 557 | 555 | 2 | 18 | 50 |
| 8 | Getxo Artea | 22 | 9 | 0 | 13 | 474 | 520 | −46 | 14 | 50 |
| 9 | Complutense Cisneros | 22 | 9 | 0 | 13 | 544 | 636 | −92 | 14 | 50 |
| 10 | Universidade Vigo | 22 | 8 | 1 | 13 | 480 | 601 | −121 | 10 | 44 |
| 11 | Hernani | 22 | 6 | 0 | 16 | 354 | 568 | −214 | 8 | 32 |
| 12 | La Vila | 22 | 3 | 0 | 19 | 383 | 823 | −440 | 5 | 17 |

Source: Federación Española de Rugby

| Qualified for championship playoff semi-finals |
| Qualified for championship playoff quarter-finals |
| Relegation playoff |
| Relegated |

== Championship playoffs ==
=== Bracket ===
Quarter-finals
4 | (Castile and León) El Salvador | 34
5 | (Basque Country (autonomous community)) Ordizia | 26
3 | (Basque Country (autonomous community)) Bizkaia Gernika | 15
6 | (Community of Madrid) Atlético Madrid | 29

Semi-finals
1 | (Castile and León) Valladolid | 22
4 | (Castile and León) El Salvador | 18
2 | (Catalonia) Santboiana | 28
6 | (Community of Madrid) Atlético Madrid | 17

Final
1 | (Castile and León) Valladolid | 27
2 | (Catalonia) Santboiana | 25

2012–13 División de Honor winners
(Castile and León)
Valladolid
Fourth title

=== Quarter-finals ===
| May 18, 2013 | Bizkaia Gernika | 15–29 | Atlético Madrid | Urbieta, Gernika |
| 17:00 (UTC+2) | Try: Urionabarrenetxea 40'; García-Parrado 48' c Con: Olaeta (1/2); Pen: Olaeta (1/1) 33' | Report | Try: Cloppet 2' c Rey 27' c Brasca 56' c Martín 65'; Con: Nacho Heredia (3/4); Pen: Nacho Heredia (1/1) | Referee: Félix Villegas (Castile and León) |

| May 19, 2013 | El Salvador | 34–26 | Ordizia | Pepe Rojo, Valladolid |
| 12:30 (UTC+2) | Try: Carter 38' c Díaz 41' de la Llana 62'; Mamea 71' c Carter 74' c Con: Carrizo (3/5); Pen: Carrizo (1/1) 6' | Report | Try: Marshall 22' c Darkintis 80' c Con: Kroll (2/2); Pen: Kroll (4/4) 3', 26', 54', 60' | Attendance: 1,500; Referee: Sergi Figueruelo (Catalonia) |

==== Semifinals ====
| May 25, 2013 | Valladolid | 22–18 | El Salvador | Pepe Rojo, Valladolid |
| 18:00 (UTC+2) | Try: Rolls 18'; Álex Gutiérrez 36' c Gavidi 79' c Con: Griffiths (2/3); Pen: Griffiths (1/1) 55' | Report | Try: Carter 6' c Pearce 26' c Con: Carrizo (2/2); Pen: Carrizo (2/2) 33', 48' | Attendance: 5,000; Referee: Pedro Montoya (Basque Country) |

| May 26, 2013 | Santboiana | 28–17 | Atlético Madrid | Baldiri Aleu, Sant Boi de Llobregat |
| 12:00 (UTC+2) | Try: ? 28' c Puig 37' c Kiri Kiri ?' c Con: Lauret (2/2); Pen: Lauret (2/2) 26', 66'; Canning (1/1) 76' | Report | Try: Canosa 58' c ? 78' c Con: Nacho Heredia (2/2); Pen: Nacho Heredia (1/2) 40' | Referee: Igotz Gallastegi (Basque Country) |

==== Final ====
| June 2, 2013 | Valladolid | 27–25 | Santboiana | Pepe Rojo, Valladolid |
| 12:00 (UTC+2) | Try: Try penal 31' c Gavidi 75' c Perico 82' c Con: Griffiths (3/3); Pen: Griffiths (2/2) 13', 54' | Report | Try: Baker 12' c Kiri Kiri 24'; Lyons 63' c Con: Lauret (2/3); Pen: Lauret (2/2) 10', 17' | Attendance: 4,000; Referee: Igotz Gallastegi (Basque Country) |

== Relegation playoff ==
The relegation playoff was contested over two legs by Hernani, who finished 11th in División de Honor, and neighbours Alcobendas, the losing team from División de Honor B promotion playoff final. Vigo won the tie, winning 36-25 on aggregate.

| Relegation/promotion playoff |
| 11th | (Basque Country (autonomous community)) Hernani | 31 | 5 | 36 |
| DHB | (Community of Madrid) Alcobendas | 11 | 14 | 25 |

=== 1st leg ===
| May 12, 2013 | Alcobendas | 11–31 | Hernani | Las Terrazas, Alcobendas |
| 12:30 (UTC+2) | Try: Mateu 66'; Pen: Ati (2/2) 41', 45' | Report | Try: Apezetxea 14'; Etxeberria 22' c Garmendia 73' c Con: Genua (2/3); Pen: Genua (4/4) 20', 40', 63', 80' | Referee: Alhambra Nievas (Andalusia) |

=== 2nd leg ===
| May 19, 2013 | Hernani | 5–14 | Alcobendas | Landare Toki, Hernani |
| 12:00 (UTC+2) | Try: Esnal 28' | Report | Try: Anastasi 6' c Fertu 70' c Con: Ati (2/2) | Referee: Jorge Molpeceres (Catalonia) |

- Hernani remained in División de Honor. Sanitas Alcobendas remained in División de Honor B.

== See also ==
- 2012–13 División de Honor B de Rugby
