= 2022–23 División de Honor de Rugby =

2022–23 División de Honor
- Countries: Spain
- Date: 2 October 2022
- Champions: Valladolid
- Runners-up: Aparejadores
- Promoted: Alcobendas
- Relegated: La Vila, Gernika

The 2022–23 División de Honor was the 56th season of the División de Honor, the top flight of Spanish domestic rugby union.

Valladolid won its sixth title in seven years, its twelfth overall, defeating Aparejadores in the final.

== Competition format ==
The season took place between October and May.

Points were awarded as follows:

- 4 points for a win
- 2 points for a draw
- 1 bonus point for a team scoring 4 tries or more in a match
- 1 bonus point for a team that loses a match by 7 points or fewer

Each team played twelve games - one game against each opponent. Then the league divided into two groups: the top six teams progressed to Group A and the remaining seven teams progressed to Group B. The teams played the other members of their groups once more, meaning Group A teams played a further five games and Group B teams play a further six.

As before, eight teams qualified for the playoffs, meaning the top two teams from Group B went through along with the six teams from Group A.

The division was made up of thirteen teams this season instead of the usual twelve after controversy during the 2021-22 season.

La Vila and Gernika finished eleventh and twelfth in 2021-22, but Alcobendas were automatically relegated for fielding an ineligible player. This earned La Vila a reprieve from relegation. Initially, Gernika were set to be relegated, but they argued that Alcobendas' point reduction meant the Madrid side technically finished bottom, and that they were therefore denied their rightful opportunity to play off against the runner-up from the Division B playoffs, Belenos RC.

The Spanish Rugby Federation ruled that denying either team - Gernika or Belenos - a place in the top flight would be unfair.

As the division had an extra team, two teams were automatically relegated (instead of one) and the team finishing eleventh contested a playoff against the runner-up from the División B playoffs.

=== Promotion and relegation ===
The second-tier División de Honor B is made up of three regional groups. The top eight teams across the three groups play off; the champion is promoted to División de Honor, at the expense of the team which finishes last in the División de Honor.

The runner-up plays a further playoff against the team which finishes 11th in the top flight.

== Teams ==
Alcobendas were relegated while Pozuelo and Belenos RC were promoted. Gernika were given a reprieve despite finishing bottom of the table last year, meaning the division grew to 13 members.

Team	Stadium	Capacity	Location	
Aparejadores	San Amaro	1,000	Burgos, Castile and León	2022–23 División de Honor teams
Belenos RC	Estadio Santa Bárbara	5,000	Avilés, Asturias	2022–23 División de Honor teams
Ciencias	Instalaciones Deportivas La Cartuja	3,000	Seville, Andalusia	2022–23 División de Honor teams
Complutense Cisneros	Estadio Complutense	12,400	Madrid, Madrid	2022–23 División de Honor teams
El Salvador	Pepe Rojo	5,000	Valladolid, Castile and León	2022–23 División de Honor teams
FC Barcelona	La Teixonera	500	Barcelona, Catalonia	2022–23 División de Honor teams
Gernika RT	Urbieta zelaia	3,000	Gernika	2022–23 División de Honor teams
La Vila	Campo de Rugby “El Pantano”	1,550	La Vila Joiosa, Valencia	2022–23 División de Honor teams
Les Abelles	Polideportivo de Quatre Carreres	500	Valencia, Valencia	2022–23 División de Honor teams
Ordizia	Altamira	2,000	Ordizia, Basque Country	2022–23 División de Honor teams
Pozuelo	Valle de las Cañas	500	Pozuelo de Alarcón, Madrid	2022–23 División de Honor teams
Santboiana	Baldiri Aleu	3,500	Sant Boi de Llobregat, Catalonia	2022–23 División de Honor teams
Valladolid	Pepe Rojo	5,000	Valladolid, Castile and León	2022–23 División de Honor teams

== Standings ==
=== First phase ===
	Team	P	W	D	L	F	A	+/-	TF	TA	+/-	Bon	Los	Pts
1	Valladolid	12	11	0	1	386	170	216	50	19	31	8	1	53
2	Ciencias	12	10	0	2	481	192	289	73	20	53	8	1	49
3	Aparejadores	12	10	0	2	502	245	257	65	35	30	6	1	47
4	El Salvador	12	7	1	4	356	240	116	48	29	19	5	1	36
5	FC Barcelona	12	7	0	5	406	288	118	57	35	22	2	4	34
6	Santboiana	12	7	1	4	360	292	68	48	37	11	2	2	34
7	Complutense Cisneros	12	7	0	5	271	262	9	31	31	0	3	2	33
8	Ordizia	12	5	0	7	306	343	-37	39	41	-2	2	3	25
9	Pozuelo	12	5	0	7	337	405	-68	40	56	-16	2	1	23
10	Belenos RC	12	4	0	8	234	332	-98	28	43	-15	1	2	19
11	Les Abelles	12	3	0	9	267	346	-79	33	46	-13	2	4	18
12	Gernika RT	12	1	0	11	225	402	-177	33	58	-25	1	2	7
13	La Vila	12	0	0	12	84	698	-614	9	104	-95	0	0	0

Qualified for Group A
Qualified for Group B

=== Second phase ===
Group A

	Team	P	W	D	L	F	A	+/-	TF	TA	+/-	Bon	Los	Pts
1	Valladolid	17	14	1	2	562	272	290	75	34	41	10	2	70
2	Aparejadores	17	15	0	2	667	332	335	85	46	39	8	1	69
3	Ciencias	17	13	1	3	635	287	348	96	32	64	11	1	61
4	Santboiana	17	9	1	7	487	457	30	63	60	3	2	3	43
5	FC Barcelona	17	8	0	8	518	484	34	72	62	10	2	4	38
6	El Salvador	17	7	1	9	420	393	27	58	49	9	5	3	38

Group B

	Team	P	W	D	L	F	A	+/-	TF	TA	+/-	Bon	Los	Pts
1	Complutense Cisneros	18	12	0	6	550	392	158	71	50	21	6	2	56
2	Ordizia	18	10	0	8	608	489	119	84	60	24	6	3	49
3	Belenos RC	18	8	0	10	393	469	-76	50	59	-9	3	2	37
4	Les Abelles	18	7	0	11	476	466	10	60	61	-1	3	5	36
5	Pozuelo	18	6	0	12	528	573	-45	68	78	-10	3	4	31
6	Gernika RT	18	3	0	15	353	582	-229	52	85	-33	2	3	17
7	La Vila	18	0	0	18	131	1132	-1001	14	172	-158	0	0	0

Qualified for playoff quarterfinals
Relegation playoff
Relegation to División de Honor B

== Playoffs ==
Quarter finals
1	(Castile and León) Valladolid	28
8	(Basque Country (autonomous community)) Ordizia	17
4	(Catalonia) Santboiana	38
5	(Catalonia) FC Barcelona	31
2	(Castile and León) Aparejadores	32
7	(Community of Madrid) Cisneros	22
3	(Andalusia) Ciencias	36
6	(Community of Madrid) El Salvador	12

Semifinals
(Castile and León) Valladolid	46
(Catalonia) Santboiana	11
(Castile and León) Aparejadores	28
(Andalusia) Ciencias	21

Final
(Castile and León) Valladolid	40
(Castile and León) Aparejadores	34

== Copa del Rey ==
The Copa del Rey's format was changed.

The teams finishing in the top six after the first phase of the league qualified for the Copa del Rey. The team finishing third played the team finishing sixth, while the team finishing fourth faced the team finishing fifth.

=== Playoffs ===
23 April 2023

(Castile and León) Aparejadores	47-12	(Catalonia) FC Barcelona

23 April 2023

(Catalonia) Santboiana	35-7	(Castile and León) El Salvador

The winners of these two games progressed to the semifinal draw with the top two.

=== Semifinals ===
30 April 2023

(Andalusia) Ciencias	8-17	(Castile and León) Valladolid

30 April 2023

(Castile and León) Aparejadores	46-28	(Catalonia) Santboiana

The final was won by Valladolid in May, setting them on the path to a league and cup double.

=== Final ===
7 May 2023

(Castile and León) Valladolid	29-25	(Castile and León) Aparejadores

== Relegation playoff ==
The relegation playoff was played over two legs by Pozuelo, the team finishing 10th in División de Honor, and Independiente, the losing team from División de Honor B promotion playoff final. Pozuelo won 170–46 on aggregate and retained their place in the División de Honor for the 2023–24 season.

Relegation/promotion playoff
11th	(Community of Madrid) Pozuelo	73	97	170
DHB	(Cantabria) Independiente	25	21	46
