= 2015–16 División de Honor de Rugby =

Spanish rugby union competition

2015–16 División de Honor
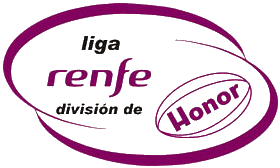
- Countries: Spain
- Date: 19 September 2015 – 1 May 2016 (regular season); 15 May 2016 – 28 May 2016 (championship playoff)
- Champions: El Salvador
- Runners-up: Valladolid
- Relegated: Pozuelo
- Matches played: 137
- Tries scored: 791 (average 5.8 per match)
- Top point scorer: Samuel Katz, 317
- Top try scorer: Anthony Matoto, 24

The 2015–16 División de Honor was the 49th season of the top flight of the Spanish domestic rugby union competition since its inception in 1953. Regular season began on 19 September 2015 and finished on 1 May 2016.

The playoffs began in May, with the Final taking place on 28 May.

El Salvador won its eighth División de Honor title after defeating local arch-rivals Valladolid in the Final 24–23, held at Estadio Pepe Rojo on 28 May. Pozuelo was the team relegated to División de Honor B de Rugby.

== Competition format ==
The season took place between September and March, with every team playing each other home and away for a total of 22 matches. Points were awarded according to the following:

- 4 points for a win
- 2 points for a draw
- 1 bonus point for a team scoring 4 tries or more in a match
- 1 bonus point for a team that loses a match by 7 points or fewer

The six teams with the highest number of points at the end of 22 rounds of matches played the championship playoffs. The top two teams win a semifinal berth automatically, while the next four teams played off to take the remaining two spots.

The club which finished bottom was relegated, while the club that finished 11th went into a playoff with a team from División de Honor B.

=== Promotion and relegation ===
The bottom team in the standings was relegated to División de Honor B, while the team finishing 11th played the relegation playoff. The top team from División de Honor B was promoted to División de Honor.

== Teams ==
Team	Stadium	Capacity	Location	
Alcobendas	Las Terrazas	2,000	Alcobendas, Madrid	2015–16 División de Honor teams
Barcelona	La Teixonera	500	Barcelona	2015–16 División de Honor teams
Cisneros	Estadio Complutense	12,400	Madrid	2015–16 División de Honor teams
El Salvador	Pepe Rojo	5,000	Valladolid	2015–16 División de Honor teams
Gernika_RT	Urbieta zelaia	1,000	Gernika	2015–16 División de Honor teams
Getxo Artea R.T.	Fadura	1,000	Guecho	2015–16 División de Honor teams
Hernani	Landare Toki	500	Hernani, Gipuzkoa	2015–16 División de Honor teams
Independiente	San Román	1,500	Santander, Cantabria	2015–16 División de Honor teams
Ordizia	Altamira	500	Ordizia, Gipuzkoa	2015–16 División de Honor teams
Pozuelo	Valle de las Cañas	300	Pozuelo de Alarcón, Madrid	2015–16 División de Honor teams
Santboiana	Baldiri Aleu	4,000	Sant Boi de Llobregat	2015–16 División de Honor teams
Valladolid	Pepe Rojo	5,000	Valladolid	2015–16 División de Honor teams

== Results ==
	ALC	BAR	CIS	ELS	GER	GET	HER	IND	ORD	POZ	SAN	VAL
Alcobendas		29-7	27-36	24-16	42-18	42-7	34-17	37-24	44-56	22-23	14-44	10-43
Barcelona	23-16		24-41	15-15	28-24	40-20	24-15	7-47	22-34	10-6	38-44	21-30
Cisneros	7-20	41-23		17-27	32-29	53-31	51-17	16-24	49-31	30-3	36-18	22-22
El Salvador	27-17	45-10	29-21		38-15	47-18	57-0	30-23	43-14	52-17	42-39	40-19
Gernika RT	16-13	55-12	16-14	21-37		20-22	27-21	24-30	22-32	19-17	33-32	17-21
Getxo	14-19	18-25	27-32	12-51	34-22		31-12	17-28	14-50	28-39	31-15	5-27
Hernani	30-25	26-20	34-27	13-40	42-20	15-29		20-34	22-20	22-18	0-32	0-41
Independiente	26-34	34-34	21-16	36-34	17-19	35-21	31-12		50-14	42-30	49-20	16-39
Ordizia	27-28	15-19	13-16	18-24	20-13	25-27	29-46	6-29		42-33	10-37	16-18
Pozuelo	10-21	5-29	19-22	8-40	34-19	21-33	30-25	24-41	56-36		31-13	10-29
Santboiana	28-24	34-13	17-21	61-24	40-10	49-24	48-22	24-13	56-12	56-7		26-32
Valladolid	38-21	45-12	33-6	20-5	41-13	28-14	75-12	20-13	46-20	64-14	44-15	

== Table ==
#	Team	Games				Points			Tries			Bon	Pts
#	Team	P	W	D	L	F	A	+/-	F	A	+/-	Bon	Pts
1	Valladolid	22	20	1	1	775	328	+447	105	38	67	16	98
2	El Salvador	22	17	1	4	763	438	+325	97	54	43	13	83
3	Independiente	22	14	1	7	663	498	+165	81	57	24	14	72
4	Santboiana	22	13	0	9	748	530	+218	100	65	35	17	69
5	Cisneros	22	13	1	8	606	505	+101	82	61	21	14	68
6	Alcobendas	22	11	0	11	563	537	+26	75	64	11	14	58
7	FC Barcelona	22	8	2	12	456	639	-183	54	92	-38	6	42
8	Getxo Artea RT	22	7	0	15	477	695	-298	64	95	-31	12	40
9	Ordizia R.E.	22	6	0	16	540	714	-174	73	96	-23	16	40
10	Hernani CRE	22	7	0	15	423	743	-320	60	110	-50	10	38
11	Gernika R.T	22	7	0	15	472	619	-147	58	78	-20	9	37
12	CRC Pozuelo	22	6	0	16	455	695	-240	58	97	-39	11	35
Source: División de Honor Table (accessed 4 May 2016)

Qualified for Playoff (semifinals)
Qualified for Playoff (quarter-finals)
Relegation playoff
Relegated

== Championship playoffs ==
=== Bracket ===
Quarter-finals
4	(Catalonia) UE Santboiana	23
5	(Community of Madrid) Complutense Cisneros	25
3	(Cantabria) Independiente Rugby	42
6	(Community of Madrid) Alcobendas	13

Semi-finals
1	(Castile and León) Valladolid	33
5	(Community of Madrid) Complutense Cisneros	26
2	(Castile and León) El Salvador	36
3	(Cantabria) Independiente Rugby	16

Final
1	(Castile and León) Valladolid	23
2	(Castile and León) El Salvador	24

=== Quarter-finals ===
15 May 2016	Independiente RC	42–13	Alcobendas	San Román, Santander
12:30 (UTC+2)	Try: Latrónico 2' c Steward 8' c, 80' c Penalty try 35' c Schab 53'; Con: Zabalegui (3/4) 2', 8', 35'; García (1/1) 80'; Pen: Zabalegui (3/3) 50', 64', 74'	Boxscore	Try: Íñiguez 56' c Con: Ati (1/1) 56'; Pen: Ati (2/2) 7', 31'	Referee: Luis Santos (Castile and León)

15 May 2016	Santboiana	23–25	Complutense Cisneros	Baldiri Aleu, Sant Boi de Llobregat
12:30 (UTC+2)	Try: Nichols 25' c Casey 43'; Baker 78'; Con: Casey (1/3) 25'; Pen: Millán (2/2) 55', 72'	Boxscore	Try: Sainz-Trápaga 28' c Con: Nacho Martínez (1/1) 28'; Pen: Nacho Martínez (5/5) 14', 40', 52', 76', 80'; Drop: Gimeno 60'	Referee: Iñigo Atorrasagasti (Basque Country)

=== Semifinals ===
21 May 2016	El Salvador	36–16	Independiente RC	Pepe Rojo, Valladolid
17:00 (UTC+2)	Try: Díaz 55' c Carter 68' c Zebango 80' c Con: Katz (3/3) 55', 68', 80'; Pen: Katz (3/3) 3', 42', 50', 53'	Boxscore	Try: Coronel 39' c Con: Zabalegui (1/1) 39'; Pen: Zabalegui (3/3) 11', 25', 36'	Referee: Alhambra Nievas (Andalusia)

22 May 2016	Valladolid	33–26	Complutense Cisneros	Pepe Rojo, Valladolid
12:30 (UTC+2)	Try: Abril 15' c Griffiths 32' c Castiglioni 65' c Con: Griffiths (3/3) 15', 32', 65'; Pen: Griffiths (3/3) 13', 22', 72'; Nuno Penha (1/1) 78'	Boxscore	Try: Molina 28 c, 75'; Cano 80'; Con: Nacho Martínez (1/3) 28'; Pen: Nacho Martínez (3/3) 6', 42', 46'	Referee: Marc Riera (Catalonia)

==== Final ====
28 May 2016	Valladolid	23–24	El Salvador	Pepe Rojo, Valladolid
17:30 (UTC+2)	Try: Nuno Penha 9'; Con: Griffiths (0/1); Pen: Griffiths (5/5) 2', 26', 30', 45', 72'; Drop: Griffiths 63'	Boxscore	Try: Marrón 13' c Blanco 70'; Con: Katz (1/2) 13'; Pen: Katz (4/4) 37', 49', 57', 79'	Attendance: 5,000; Referee: Iñigo Atorrasagasti (Basque Country)

2015–16 División de Honor winners
(Castile and León)
El Salvador
Eighth title

== Relegation playoff ==
The relegation playoff was played over two legs by Bizkaia Gernika, the team finishing 11th in División de Honor, and CAU Valencia, the losing team from División de Honor B promotion playoff final. Bizkaia Gernika won 129–25 on aggregate and remained in División de Honor for 2016–17 season.

Relegation/promotion playoff
11th	(Basque Country (autonomous community)) Bizkaia Gernika	35	94	129
DHB	(Valencian Community) CAU Valencia	7	18	25

=== 1st leg ===
5 June 2016	CAU Valencia	7–35	Bizkaia Gernika	Campo del Río Turia, Valencia
12:00	Try: Herrero 50' c Con: Sorribes (1/1) 50'	Boxscore	Try: Pietrelli 5' c Amor 9' c, 77' c Souville 25' c Bertero 38' c Con: Bertero (5/5) 6', 10', 26', 39', 78'	Referee: Ignacio Muñoz (Madrid)

=== 2nd leg ===
12 June 2016	Bizkaia Gernika	94–18	CAU Valencia	Urbieta, Gernika
12:00	Try: Pietrelli 1' c, 8' c, 19' c, 41'; Magunazelaia 6' c Verran 16' c, 27' c, 57' c Sclavi 39' c Morgan 50' c Es Saheb 55' c, 69'; Albizua 65' c Con: Bertero (11/13) 2', 7', 9', 17', 20', 28', 40', 51', 56', 58', 66'	Boxscore	Try: Morente 14'; Ortega 66' c Con: Sorribes (1/2) 67'; Pen: Sorribes (2/2) 13', 21'	Referee: Félix Villegas (Castile and León)

== Scorers statistics ==
=== Top try scorers ===
Rank	Player	Tries	Team
1	(Tonga) Anthony Matoto	24	Getxo Artea R.T.

=== Top points scorers ===
Rank	Player	Points	Team
1	(England) Sam Katz	352	El Salvador

== See also ==
- 2015–16 División de Honor B de Rugby
- 2016 Copa del Rey de Rugby
