= 2016–17 División de Honor de Rugby =

Spanish rugby union competition

2016–17 División de Honor
- Countries: Spain
- Date: 18 September 2016 to 28 May 2017
- Champions: Valladolid
- Runners-up: El Salvador
- Promoted: CR La Vila
- Relegated: Ciencias Sevilla CR
- Matches played: 137
- Tries scored: 921 (average 6.7 per match)
- Top point scorer: Bradley Dean Linklater, 281
- Top try scorer: Arturo Iñiguez, 17

The 2016–17 División de Honor was the 50th season of the top flight of the Spanish domestic rugby union competition since its inception in 1953.

Valladolid won the title, its seventh overall after defeating local arch-rivals El Salvador in the Final.

== Competition format ==
The season took place between September and March, with every team playing each other home and away for a total of 22 matches. Points were awarded according to the following:

- 4 points for a win
- 2 points for a draw
- 1 bonus point for a team scoring 4 tries or more in a match
- 1 bonus point for a team that loses a match by 7 points or fewer

The six teams with the highest number of points at the end of 22 rounds of matches played the championship playoffs. The top two teams win a semifinal berth automatically, while the next four teams played off to take the remaining two spots.

The club which finished bottom was relegated, while the club that finished 11th went into a playoff with a team from División de Honor B.

=== Promotion and relegation ===
The bottom team in the standings was relegated to División de Honor B, while the team finishing 11th played the relegation playoff. The top team from División de Honor B was promoted to División de Honor.

== Teams ==
Team	Stadium	Capacity	Location	
Alcobendas	Las Terrazas	2,000	Alcobendas, Madrid	2016–17 División de Honor teams
Barcelona	La Teixonera	500	Barcelona	2016–17 División de Honor teams
Bizkaia Gernika	Urbieta	2,500	Gernika, Bizkaia	2016–17 División de Honor teams
Ciencias	Instalaciones Deportivas La Cartuja	1,932	Seville	2016–17 División de Honor teams
Complutense Cisneros	Estadio Complutense	12,400	Madrid	2016–17 División de Honor teams
El Salvador	Pepe Rojo	5,000	Valladolid	2016–17 División de Honor teams
Gernika RT	Urbieta zelaia	1,000	Gernika	2016–17 División de Honor teams
Getxo Artea R.T.	Fadura	1,000	Guecho	2016–17 División de Honor teams
Hernani	Landare Toki	500	Hernani, Gipuzkoa	2016–17 División de Honor teams
Independiente RC	San Román	1,500	Santander, Cantabria	2016–17 División de Honor teams
Ordizia	Altamira	500	Ordizia, Gipuzkoa	2016–17 División de Honor teams
Santboiana	Baldiri Aleu	4,000	Sant Boi de Llobregat	2016–17 División de Honor teams
Valladolid	Pepe Rojo	5,000	Valladolid	

== Results ==
	ALC	BAR	CIE	CIS	ELS	GER	GET	HER	IND	ORD	SAN	VAL
Alcobendas		52-24	82-0	27-11	25-29	28-20	63-26	38-5	46-10	34-18	31-17	28-17
Barcelona	17-61		33-20	41-26	10-36	13-20	31-27	30-18	30-34	17-24	33-56	5-28
Ciencias	22-29	27-18		24-26	22-31	42-33	25-25	12-17	33-40	14-29	15-52	7-89
Cisneros	22-32	34-27	66-3		23-17	45-24	47-19	50-19	29-15	22-17	15-22	12-33
El Salvador	32-31	44-19	55-7	47-31		11-6	69-0	50-8	54-31	36-18	22-13	23-15
Gernika RT	27-7	40-28	27-13	7-11	14-37		37-18	14-11	27-33	24-6	24-35	13-17
Getxo	11-28	17-24	10-5	15-31	39-24	23-40		26-22	26-33	18-39	21-20	24-45
Hernani	26-0	15-7	33-10	10-29	7-48	39-26	23-13		18-22	23-8	17-34	7-41
Independiente	19-55	23-14	44-18	35-27	17-47	22-23	29-21	19-15		28-10	19-17	14-59
Ordizia	15-23	51-14	39-13	26-29	10-33	32-6	25-10	19-3	38-24		36-20	6-13
Santboiana	38-7	31-10	33-22	37-22	32-27	33-20	62-8	57-10	58-32	34-7		28-31
Valladolid	47-14	55-14	57-14	31-5	23-24	34-7	68-35	55-5	29-20	55-18	36-14	

== Table ==
N^{o}	Club	P	W	D	L	Bon	Los	F	A	+/-	Pts
1	El Salvador	22	19	0	3	15	2	796	401	395	93
2	Valladolid	22	19	0	3	16	1	878	337	541	93
3	Alcobendas	22	16	0	6	11	2	741	453	288	77
4	Santboiana	22	15	0	7	13	3	743	465	278	76
5	Complutense Cisneros	22	13	0	9	13	1	613	528	85	66
6	Independiente RC	22	12	0	10	9	1	563	694	-131	58
7	Ordizia	22	10	0	12	8	3	491	493	-2	51
8	Bizkaia Gernika	22	9	0	13	9	4	479	538	-59	49
9	Hernani	22	7	0	15	3	4	351	608	-257	35
10	Barcelona	22	5	0	17	5	4	459	739	-280	29
11	Getxo Artea R.T.	22	4	1	17	6	3	432	790	-358	27
12	Ciencias	22	2	1	19	5	5	368	868	-500	20

Qualified for playoff semifinals.
Qualified for playoff quarterfinals.
Playoff against 2nd place team from División de Honor B
Relegation to División de Honor B

== Playoffs ==
Quarter finals
3	(Community of Madrid) Alcobendas	47
6	(Cantabria) Independiente	24
4	(Catalonia) Saintboiana	39
5	(Community of Madrid) Cisneros	15

Semifinals
2	(Castile and León) Valladolid	19
3	(Community of Madrid) Alcobendas	6
1	(Castile and León) El Salvador	32
4	(Catalonia) Saintboiana	16

Final
(Castile and León) Valladolid	15
(Castile and León) El Salvador	6

== Relegation playoff ==
The relegation playoff was played over two legs by Getxo Artea, the team finishing 11th in División de Honor, and UBU-Colina Clinic, the losing team from División de Honor B promotion playoff final. Getxo Artea won 132-19 on aggregate and remained in the División de Honor A.

Relegation/promotion playoff
11th	(Basque Country (autonomous community)) Getxo Artea	47	85	132
DHB	(Castile and León) UBU	19	0	19
