= 2017–18 División de Honor de Rugby =

Spanish rugby union competition

2017–18 División de Honor
- Countries: Spain
- Date: 15 September 2017 to 26 May 2019
- Champions: Valladolid
- Runners-up: El Salvador
- Promoted: UBU-Colina Clinic
- Relegated: Getxo Artea RT
- Matches played: 137
- Tries scored: 847 (average 6.2 per match)
- Top point scorer: Valentin Cruz, 290
- Top try scorer: John Wesell Bell, 22

The 2017–18 División de Honor was the 51st season of the top flight of the Spanish domestic rugby union competition since its inception in 1953.

Valladolid won its second consecutive title, its eighth overall after defeating local arch-rivals SilverStorm El Salvador in the Final.

== Competition format ==
The División de Honor season takes place between September and March, with every team playing each other home and away for a total of 22 matches. Points are awarded according to the following:

- 4 points for a win
- 2 points for a draw
- 1 bonus point for a team scoring 4 tries or more in a match
- 1 bonus point for a team that loses a match by 7 points or fewer

The six teams with the highest number of points at the end of 22 rounds of matches play the championship playoffs. The top two teams win a semifinal berth automatically, while the next four teams play off to take the remaining two spots.

The club which finishes bottom is relegated, while the club that finishes 11th goes into a playoff with a team from División de Honor B.

=== Promotion and relegation ===
The bottom team in the standings is relegated to División de Honor B, while the team finishing 11th play the relegation playoff. The top team from División de Honor B is promoted to División de Honor.

== Teams ==
| Team | Stadium | Capacity | Location | |
|---|---|---|---|---|
| Alcobendas | Las Terrazas | 2,000 | Alcobendas, Madrid | 2017-18 División de Honor teams |
| Barcelona | La Teixonera | 500 | Barcelona | 2017-18 División de Honor teams |
| Bizkaia Gernika | Urbieta | 2,500 | Gernika, Bizkaia | 2017-18 División de Honor teams |
| Complutense Cisneros | Estadio Complutense | 12,400 | Madrid | 2017-18 División de Honor teams |
| El Salvador | Pepe Rojo | 5,000 | Valladolid | 2017-18 División de Honor teams |
| Getxo Artea R.T. | Fadura | 1,000 | Guecho | 2017-18 División de Honor teams |
| Hernani | Landare Toki | 500 | Hernani, Gipuzkoa | 2017-18 División de Honor teams |
| Independiente RC | San Román | 1,500 | Santander, Cantabria | 2017-18 División de Honor teams |
| La Vila | Campo de Rugby El Pantano | 3,000 | Villajoyosa, Valencia | 2017-18 División de Honor teams |
| Ordizia | Altamira | 500 | Ordizia, Gipuzkoa | 2017-18 División de Honor teams |
| Santboiana | Baldiri Aleu | 4,000 | Sant Boi de Llobregat | 2017-18 División de Honor teams |
| Valladolid | Pepe Rojo | 5,000 | Valladolid | 2017-18 División de Honor teams |

== Results ==
| | ALC | BAR | CIS | ELS | GER | GET | HER | IND | LaV | ORD | SAN | VAL |
| Alcobendas | | 64-12 | 24-16 | 19-37 | 31-29 | 70-10 | 41-12 | 30-27 | 29-12 | 24-24 | 46-22 | 29-30 |
| Barcelona | 7-34 | | 45-30 | 15-31 | 30-17 | 37-43 | 62-12 | 31-37 | 36-11 | 34-19 | 16-12 | 31-42 |
| Cisneros | 15-29 | 23-29 | | 40-62 | 39-26 | 48-27 | 42-25 | 26-43 | 30-49 | 25-35 | 45-14 | 10-57 |
| El Salvador | 32-28 | 50-20 | 56-22 | | 39-12 | 94-7 | 49-7 | 38-43 | 42-0 | 26-23 | 40-12 | 14-16 |
| Gernika RT | 10-11 | 21-29 | 15-13 | 12-22 | | 19-14 | 23-20 | 15-10 | 27-21 | 19-17 | 36-34 | 8-14 |
| Getxo | 17-29 | 37-22 | 0-64 | 10-48 | 12-26 | | 59-12 | 28-34 | 18-22 | 28-38 | 3-39 | 12-41 |
| Hernani | 5-34 | 20-0 | 22-28 | 12-40 | 11-16 | 33-0 | | 31-29 | 36-26 | 12-39 | 0-5 | 17-45 |
| Independiente | 35-27 | 32-38 | 40-29 | 8-29 | 48-26 | 46-31 | 61-33 | | 41-14 | 36-37 | 32-31 | 17-27 |
| La Vila | 20-21 | 22-21 | 19-22 | 21-36 | 23-7 | 52-19 | 24-8 | 29-31 | | 24-35 | 24-17 | 14-24 |
| Ordizia | 23-44 | 29-3 | 37-21 | 34-39 | 30-21 | 61-14 | 52-12 | 27-26 | 32-0 | | 35-14 | 30-41 |
| Santboiana | 78-7 | 32-24 | 41-22 | 23-28 | 42-20 | 59-33 | 60-24 | 32-35 | 27-8 | 29-22 | | 29-26 |
| Valladolid | 25-22 | 35-18 | 80-14 | 32-13 | 48-12 | 50-14 | 53-0 | 32-21 | 54-19 | 46-45 | 49-32 | |

== Table ==
| | Team | P | W | D | L | F | A | +/- | TF | TA | Bon | Los | Pts |
|---|---|---|---|---|---|---|---|---|---|---|---|---|---|
| 1. | Valladolid | 22 | 21 | 0 | 1 | 867 | 381 | +341 | 97 | 46 | 14 | 1 | 102 |
| 2. | El Salvador | 22 | 19 | 0 | 3 | 751 | 342 | +409 | 108 | 39 | 16 | 1 | 97 |
| 3. | Alcobendas | 22 | 15 | 1 | 6 | 637 | 356 | +281 | 85 | 43 | 12 | 3 | 77 |
| 4. | Independiente RC | 22 | 13 | 0 | 9 | 621 | 559 | +62 | 81 | 74 | 15 | 5 | 75 |
| 5. | Ordizia | 22 | 13 | 1 | 8 | 626 | 502 | +124 | 74 | 69 | 10 | 5 | 72 |
| 6. | Santboiana | 22 | 11 | 0 | 11 | 512 | 508 | +4 | 74 | 69 | 11 | 5 | 64 |
| 7. | Barcelona | 22 | 9 | 0 | 13 | 491 | 558 | -67 | 64 | 77 | 10 | 2 | 51 |
| 8. | Bizkaia Gernika | 22 | 9 | 0 | 13 | 348 | 455 | -107 | 47 | 55 | 4 | 3 | 44 |
| 9. | Complutense Cisneros | 22 | 7 | 0 | 15 | 557 | 617 | -60 | 76 | 83 | 10 | 1 | 42 |
| 10. | CR La Vila | 22 | 67 | 0 | 15 | 377 | 518 | -141 | 54 | 72 | 6 | 4 | 39 |
| 11. | Hernani | 22 | 4 | 0 | 18 | 316 | 630 | -314 | 46 | 89 | 5 | 4 | 26 |
| 12. | Getxo Artea R.T. | 22 | 3 | 0 | 19 | 322 | 854 | -532 | 41 | 131 | 6 | 3 | 23 |

| Qualified for semi finals of playoffs |
| Qualified for playoffs |
| Relegation play-off |
| Relegated |

== Playoffs ==
Quarter finals
3 | (Cantabria) Independiente | 44
6 | (Catalonia) Sant Boiana | 33
4 | (Community of Madrid) Alcobendas | 40
5 | (Basque Country (autonomous community)) Ordizia | 33

Semifinals
1 | (Castile and León) Valladolid | 44
3 | (Cantabria) Independiente | 5
2 | (Castile and León) El Salvador | 18
4 | (Community of Madrid) Sanitas | 12

Final
(Castile and León) Valladolid | 18
(Castile and León) El Salvador | 12

== Relegation playoff ==
The relegation playoff was played over two legs by Hernani, the team finishing 11th in División de Honor and Ciencias Sevilla, the losing team from División de Honor B promotion playoff final. Hernani won 57–48 on aggregate and remained in the División de Honor A.

| Relegation/promotion playoff |
| 11th | (Basque Country (autonomous community)) Hernani | 27 | 30 | 57 |
| DHB | (Andalusia) Ciencias Sevilla | 31 | 17 | 48 |
