= 2010–11 División de Honor de Rugby =

Spanish rugby union competition

2010–11 División de Honor
- Countries: Spain
- Champions: CR La Vila (1st title)
- Runners-up: Ordizia
- Relegated: Bera Bera; CAU Valencia
- Matches played: 90

The 2010–11 División de Honor was the 44th season of the top flight of the Spanish domestic rugby union competitions since 1953, played between September 2010 and March 2011. CR La Vila, who were runners-up the previous season, won their first ever league championship after they finished top of the table by a single point.

== Competition format ==
The season took place between September and March, with every team playing each other home and away for a total of 18 matches. Points were awarded according to the following:

- 4 points for a win
- 2 points for a draw
- 1 bonus point for a team scoring 4 tries or more in a match
- 1 bonus point for a team that loses a match by 7 points or fewer

The clubs which finished in the bottom two were relegated.

== Teams ==
Team	Stadium	Capacity	Location	
Alcobendas	Las Terrazas	500	Alcobendas, Community of Madrid	2010-11 División de Honor Teams
Bera Bera	Miniestadio de Anoeta	1,500	San Sebastián	2010-11 División de Honor Teams
Bizkaia Gernika	Urbieta	2,500	Guernica, Biscay	2010-11 División de Honor Teams
Ciencias	Olímpico La Cartuja	5,000	Seville	2010-11 División de Honor Teams
El Salvador	Pepe Rojo	5,000	Valladolid	2010-11 División de Honor Teams
La Vila	El Pantano	1,550	Villajoyosa, Alicante	2010-11 División de Honor Teams
Ordizia	Altamira	500	Ordizia, Gipuzkoa	2010-11 División de Honor Teams
Santboiana	Baldiri Aleu	1,200	Sant Boi de Llobregat	2010-11 División de Honor Teams
Valencia	Campo del Río Turia	2,000	Valencia	2010-11 División de Honor Teams
Valladolid	Pepe Rojo	5,000	Valladolid	2010-11 División de Honor Teams

== Final standings ==
	Team	Pld	W	D	L	PF	PA	Dif	TF	TA	TB	LB	Pts
1	La Vila (C)	18	15	0	3	551	380	171	64	42	8	0	68
2	Ordizia	18	13	0	5	567	371	196	69	37	11	4	67
3	El Salvador	18	11	1	6	485	309	176	66	33	8	5	59
4	Bizkaia Gernika	18	12	1	5	460	311	149	44	32	4	3	57
5	Valladolid	18	11	0	7	450	374	76	46	40	6	3	53
6	Ciencias	18	7	1	10	387	450	−63	48	46	2	2	39
7	Santboiana	18	7	0	11	309	423	−114	26	49	3	3	34
8	Alcobendas	18	6	0	12	414	478	−64	47	59	4	5	33
9	Bera Bera (R)	18	5	1	12	408	441	−33	41	45	4	7	33
10	Valencia (R)	18	1	0	17	273	767	−494	29	97	1	1	6

Source: Federación Española de Rugby

Champion
Relegated

== Scorers statistics ==
=== By Tries ===
Player	Try points	Team
(South Africa) Ryan Le Loux	17	La Vila
(Spain) Matías Tudela	13	Ordizia
(Argentina) Santiago Fernández	9	Alcobendas
(Argentina) Carlos Coronel	9	Bizkaia Gernika
(Samoa) Esera Lauina	9	El Salvador
(England) Tobias Freeman	9	Ordizia
(Samoa) Joe Mamea	8	El Salvador
(New Zealand) Daniel Schuster	8	Valladolid
(New Zealand) Phillip Huxford	7	Ordizia
(Republic of Ireland) Nicolas Thompson	7	Bera Bera

=== By total points ===
Player	Points	Team
(France) Vincent Gassie	210	Bizkaia Gernika
(New Zealand) Phillip Huxford	186	Ordizia
(Spain) Agustín Gómez	156	La Vila
(England) Gareth Griffiths	153	Valladolid
(France) Ramuntxo Mittoux	131	Bera Bera
(Spain) Eduardo Sorribes	125	Rugby Valencia
(Argentina) Gastón Graco	119	Alcobendas
(Argentina) Santiago Fernández	99	Alcobendas
(Spain) Jaime Nava	94	El Salvador
(South Africa) Ryan Le Loux	85	La Vila
