= 2016 Copa del Rey de Rugby =

2016 Spaniard Rugby Championship

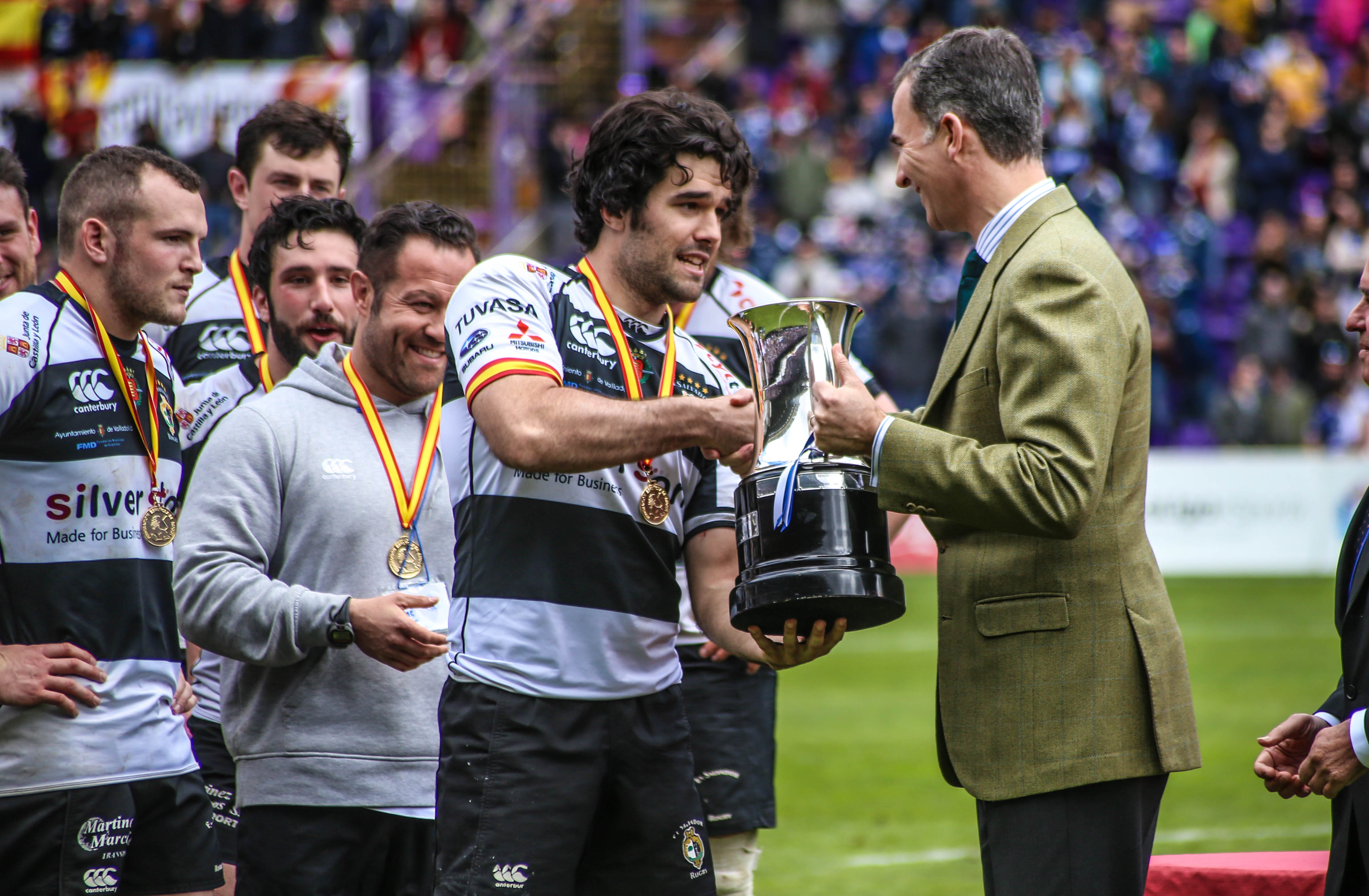
- King Felipe VI gives the trophy to SilverStorm El Salvador

Tournament details
- Date: 10 January 2016 – 17 April 2016

Tournament statistics
- Teams: 7
- Matches played: 7

Final
- Venue: Estadio José Zorrilla, Valladolid
- Attendance: 26,500
- Champions: SilverStorm El Salvador (7th title)
- Runners-up: VRAC Quesos Entrepinares

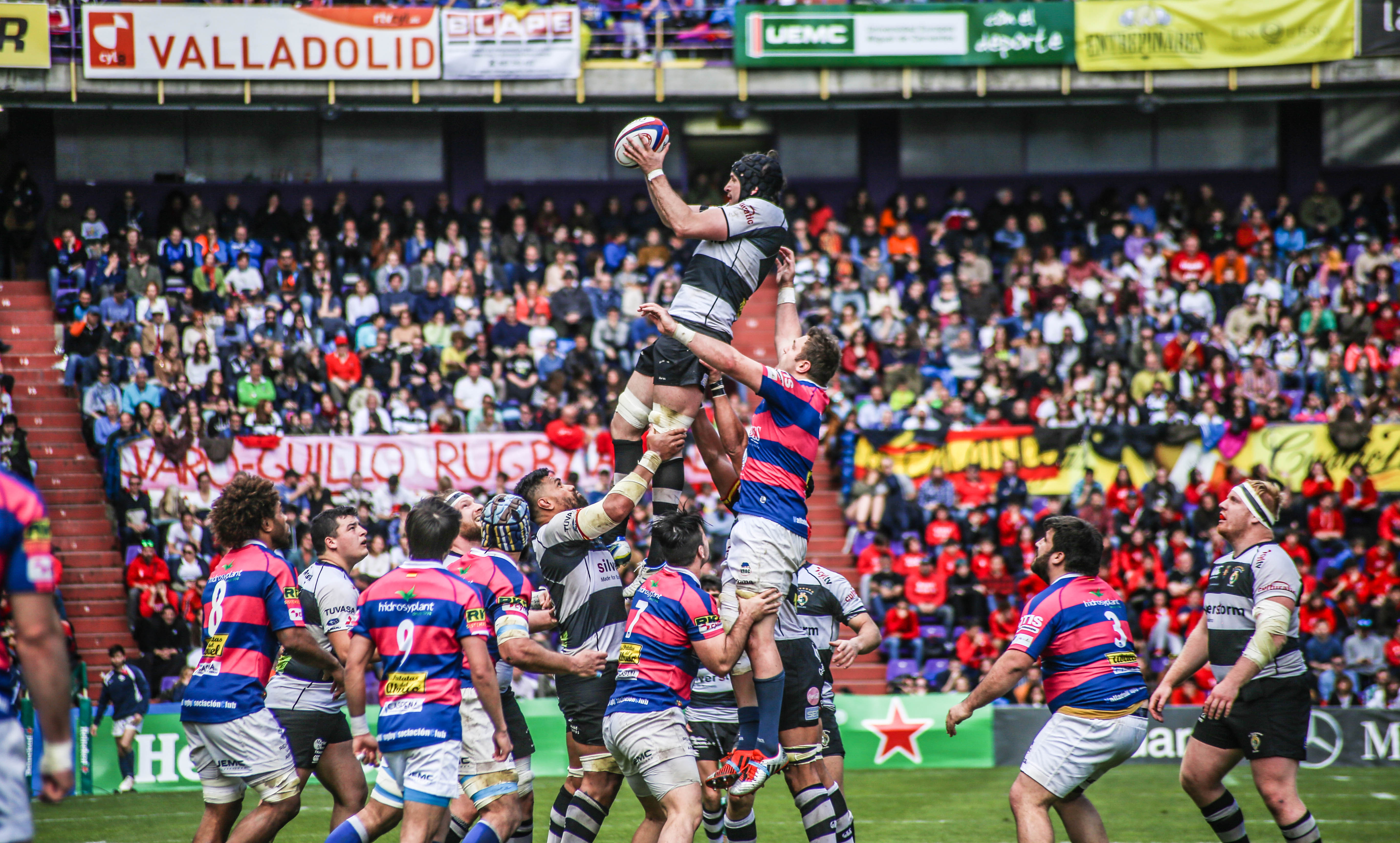
Final game between SilverStorm El Salvador and VRAC Quesos Entrepinares.

The 2015–16 Copa del Rey de Rugby was the 83rd edition of this tournament. SilverStorm El Salvador defeated local rival VRAC Quesos Entrepinares in the final of the tournament. This game beat the attendance record for a rugby union game in Spain with 26,500 spectators. King Felipe VI of Spain attended to the game.

== Competition format ==
This edition was featured top seven teams at the end of the first half (round 11) of the 2015–16 División de Honor de Rugby. UE Santboiana declined to play.

All rounds were played with a single game format.

=== Calendar ===
Round	Date	Fixtures	Clubs	Notes
Quarter-finals	10 January 2016	3	6 → 3	7 top 2015–16 División de Honor teams at midseason
Semi-finals	31 January 2016	2	4 → 2	VRAC Quesos Entrepinares gain entry.
Final		1	2 → 1	

== Quarter-finals ==
Draw was held on 14 December 2015 at Spanish Rugby Federation headquarters. Top seeded team, VRAC Quesos Entrepinares, received a bye to Semifinals.

Matches played on 10 January 2016.

Team 1	Score	Team 2
SilverStorm El Salvador (Castile and León)	12–6	(Community of Madrid) Complutense Cisneros
AMPO Ordizia (Basque Country (autonomous community))	13−32	(Community of Madrid) Alcobendas
Getxo Artea (Basque Country (autonomous community))	19–27	(Cantabria) Bathco Rugby

Teams qualified to next round
SilverStorm El Salvador	Alcobendas	Bathco Rugby

== Semifinals ==
Draw took place on 11 January 2016 at Spanish Rugby Federation headquarters. Draw included three winners from Quarter-finals plus top-seed, VRAC Quesos Entrepinares.

Matches to be played on 31 January 2016.

Team 1	Score	Team 2
Alcobendas (Community of Madrid)	20–25	(Castile and León) VRAC Quesos Entrepinares
Bathco Rugby (Cantabria)	12–26	(Castile and León) SilverStorm El Salvador

=== Matches ===
31 January 2016
12:30 (UTC+2)

Alcobendas	20–25	VRAC Quesos Entrepinares
Try: Londoño 70' c Cabrera 79' c Con: Fernández (2/2) 71', 79'; Pen: Fernández (2/2) 40', 58'	Report	Try: Hall 72' c Con: Griffiths (1/1) 72'; Pen: Griffiths (6/6) 9', 15', 30', 52', 60', 66'

Las Terrazas, Alcobendas
Attendance: 1,100
Referee: Igotz Gallastegi (Basque Country)

31 January 2016
12:30 (UTC+2)

Bathco Rugby	12–26	SilverStorm El Salvador
Try: Steward 30'; Guido 73'; García 73'	Report	Try: Blanco 20' c Pearce 44' c Con: Katz (2/2) 20', 44'; Pen: Katz (4/4) 6', 18', 33', 37'

San Román, Santander
Referee: Pedro Montoya (Basque Country)

Teams qualified to Final
VRAC Quesos Entrepinares	SilverStorm El Salvador

== Final ==
The match was marked for an attendance-record (26,500) in a rugby match in Spain.

17 April 2016
13:00 (UTC+2)

SilverStorm El Salvador	13–9	VRAC Quesos Entrepinares
Try: Díaz 21' c Con: Katz (1/1) 21'; Pen: Katz (1/1) 10'	Report	Pen: Griffiths (3/4) 30', 32', 66'

José Zorrilla, Valladolid
Attendance: 26,500 (record-attendance)
Referee: Jorge Molpeceres (Castile and León)

2016 Copa del Rey winners
(Castile and León)
SilverStorm El Salvador
Seventh title
