= 2018–19 División de Honor de Rugby =

Spanish rugby union competition

2018–19 División de Honor
- Countries: Spain
- Date: 16 September 2018 - 2 June 2019
- Champions: Valladolid RAC
- Runners-up: El Salvador
- Promoted: Ciencias Sevilla CR, Independiente RC
- Relegated: Bizkaia Gernika, CR La Vila
- Matches played: 137
- Tries scored: 939 (average 6.9 per match)
- Top point scorer: Valentin Cruz, 271
- Top try scorer: Juandre Kleynhans, 22

The 2018–19 División de Honor was the 52nd season of the top flight of the Spanish domestic rugby union competition since its inception in 1953.

The championship playoffs began in May finishing with the Final on 28 May.

Valladolid won its third consecutive title, its ninth overall, after defeating local arch-rivals SilverStorm El Salvador in the Final.

== Competition format ==
The División de Honor season takes place between September and March, with every team playing each other home and away for a total of 22 matches. Points are awarded according to the following:

- 4 points for a win
- 2 points for a draw
- 1 bonus point for a team scoring 4 tries or more in a match
- 1 bonus point for a team that loses a match by 7 points or fewer

The six teams with the highest number of points at the end of 22 rounds of matches play the championship playoffs. The top two teams win a semifinal berth automatically, while the next four teams play off to take the remaining two spots.

The club which finishes bottom is relegated, while the club that finishes 11th goes into a playoff with a team from División de Honor B.

=== Promotion and relegation ===
The bottom team in the standings is relegated to División de Honor B, while the team finishing 11th play the relegation playoff. The top team from División de Honor B is promoted to División de Honor.

== Teams ==
Team	Stadium	Capacity	Location	
Alcobendas	Las Terrazas	2,000	Alcobendas, Madrid	2018–19 División de Honor teams
Aparejadores	San Amaro	1,500	Burgos	2018–19 División de Honor teams
Barcelona	La Teixonera	500	Barcelona	2018–19 División de Honor teams
Bizkaia Gernika	Urbieta	2,500	Gernika, Bizkaia	2018–19 División de Honor teams
Complutense Cisneros	Estadio Complutense	12,400	Madrid	2018–19 División de Honor teams
El Salvador	Pepe Rojo	5,000	Valladolid	2018–19 División de Honor teams
Hernani	Landare Toki	500	Hernani, Gipuzkoa	2018–19 División de Honor teams
Independiente RC	San Román	1,500	Santander, Cantabria	2018–19 División de Honor teams
La Vila	Campo de Rugby El Pantano	3,000	Villajoyosa, Valencia	2018–19 División de Honor teams
Ordizia	Altamira	500	Ordizia, Gipuzkoa	2018–19 División de Honor teams
Santboiana	Baldiri Aleu	4,000	Sant Boi de Llobregat	2018–19 División de Honor teams
Valladolid	Pepe Rojo	5,000	Valladolid	2018–19 División de Honor teams

== Results ==
	ALC	APA	BAR	CIS	ELS	GER	HER	IND	LaV	ORD	SAN	VAL
Alcobendas		21-10	43-14	25-7	31-31	26-20	59-19	38-10	42-40	27-33	21-14	17-16
Aparejadores	23-25		27-36	32-29	29-27	57-17	46-18	39-36	48-15	30-47	29-15	11-48
Barcelona	26-29	40-3		18-18	20-59	21-17	19-12	20-12	11-17	22-34	26-27	21-34
Cisneros	35-37	30-24	26-31		17-57	32-39	43-36	34-39	17-21	18-35	33-27	14-54
El Salvador	33-25	36-18	33-16	54-31		52-21	77-28	43-24	36-14	51-10	55-7	26-17
Gernika	27-29	27-28	17-24	30-10	12-31		29-27	29-39	18-13	23-24	13-13	21-42
Hernani	15-14	8-6	20-13	6-22	12-45	35-27		20-31	22-16	39-15	27-34	20-22
Independiente	23-26	27-31	24-32	14-43	28-29	54-21	36-31		33-17	27-26	21-34	22-28
La Vila	12-21	24-30	16-21	18-17	7-40	20-27	29-38	35-20		31-24	17-15	20-44
Ordizia	22-30	27-40	40-13	15-7	13-13	55-22	36-10	11-11	35-28		48-31	29-45
Santboiana	32-12	37-29	19-22	25-18	5-24	53-13	27-14	42-30	41-28	22-23		25-33
Valladolid	25-16	64-22	22-37	36-25	20-0	27-27	41-10	62-19	61-33	41-12	34-21	

== Table ==
	Team	P	W	D	L	F	A	+/-	TF	TA	Bon	Los	Pts
1	El Salvador	22	18	2	2	852	405	447	120	53	15	1	92
2	Valladolid	22	18	1	3	816	448	368	107	53	14	1	89
3	Alcobendas	22	16	1	5	614	487	127	80	62	10	2	78
4	Ordizia	22	12	2	8	614	581	33	76	77	9	2	63
5	Aparejadores	22	11	0	11	612	654	-42	80	86	12	3	59
6	Barcelona	22	11	1	10	503	549	-46	64	65	7	4	57
7	Santboiana	22	10	1	11	566	570	-4	79	74	10	5	57
8	Independiente RC	22	7	1	14	580	691	-111	74	94	8	5	43
9	Hernani CRE	22	7	0	15	467	687	-220	61	91	7	6	41
10	Complutense Cisneros	22	5	1	16	526	673	-147	73	94	9	8	39
11	La Vila	22	6	0	16	471	661	-190	61	92	7	7	38
12	Bizkaia Gernika	22	5	2	15	497	712	-215	64	98	6	6	36

Qualified for playoff semifinals.
Qualified for playoff quarterfinals.
Playoff against 2nd place team from División de Honor B
Relegation to División de Honor B

== Playoffs ==
Quarter finals
3	(Community of Madrid) Alcobendas	34
6	(Catalonia) Barcelona	20
4	(Basque Country (autonomous community)) Ordizia	38
5	(Castile and León) Aparejadores	31

Semifinals
2	(Castile and León) Valladolid	33
3	(Community of Madrid) Alcobendas	12
1	(Castile and León) El Salvador	39
4	(Basque Country (autonomous community)) Ordizia	26

Final
(Castile and León) Valladolid	39
(Castile and León) El Salvador	27

== Relegation playoff ==
The relegation playoff was played over two legs by La Vila, the team finishing 11th in División de Honor, and Santander, the losing team from División de Honor B promotion playoff final. Santander won 57–53 on aggregate and gained promotion to the División de Honor for the 2019–20 season.

Relegation/promotion playoff
11th	(Alicante) La Vila	14	39	53
DHB	(Cantabria) Santander	30	27	57
