= 2019–20 División de Honor de Rugby =

Spanish rugby union competition

2019–20 División de Honor
- Countries: Spain
- Date: 15 September 2019 - 1 March 2020
- Champions: Valladolid RAC
- Runners-up: SilverStorm El Salvador
- Promoted: Getxo Artea RT
- Relegated: Hernani
- Matches played: 102
- Tries scored: 652 (average 6.4 per match)
- Top point scorer: Valentin Cruz, 219
- Top try scorer: Nathan Derk Paila, 12

The 2019–20 División de Honor was the 53rd season of the top flight of the Spanish domestic rugby union competition since its inception in 1953.

Valladolid won its fourth consecutive title, its tenth overall, in a curtailed season.

== Competition format ==
The División de Honor season takes place between September and March, with every team playing each other home and away for a total of 22 matches. Points are awarded according to the following:

- 4 points for a win
- 2 points for a draw
- 1 bonus point for a team scoring 4 tries or more in a match
- 1 bonus point for a team that loses a match by 7 points or fewer

The six teams with the highest number of points at the end of 22 rounds of matches play the championship playoffs. The top two teams win a semifinal berth automatically, while the next four teams play off to take the remaining two spots.

=== Promotion and relegation ===
The second-tier División de Honor B is made up of three regional groups. The top eight teams across the three groups play off; the champion is promoted to División de Honor, at the expense of the team which finishes last in the División de Honor. The runner-up plays a further play-off against the team which finishes 11th in the top flight.

=== Covid-19 pandemic ===
As a result of the pandemic, the season was curtailed after 17 games. Valladolid were declared champions, as they were league leaders. Hernani were relegated to División de Honor B.

In the absence of regional playoffs, Getxo Artea RT were promoted after topping Group A of División de Honor B with 95 points. Their superior points difference saw them preferred to Jaén, who topped Group C with the same number of points.

Bathco did not have to play the relegation playoff, and remained in the top flight.

== Teams ==
Team	Stadium	Capacity	Location	
Alcobendas	Las Terrazas	2,000	Alcobendas, Madrid	2019–20 División de Honor teams
Aparejadores	San Amaro	1,000	Burgos, Castile and León	2019–20 División de Honor teams
Barcelona	La Teixonera	500	Barcelona, Catalonia	2019–20 División de Honor teams
Bathco Rugby Santander	San Román	1,500	Santander, Cantabria	2019–20 División de Honor teams
Ciencias	Instalaciones Deportivas La Cartuja	3,000	Seville, Andalusia	2019–20 División de Honor teams
Complutense Cisneros	Estadio Complutense	12,400	Madrid, Madrid	2019–20 División de Honor teams
El Salvador	Pepe Rojo	5,000	Valladolid, Castile and León	2019–20 División de Honor teams
Hernani	Landare Toki	500	Hernani, Basque Country	2019–20 División de Honor teams
Independiente RC	San Román	1,500	Santander, Cantabria	2019–20 División de Honor teams
Ordizia	Altamira	500	Ordizia, Basque Country	2019–20 División de Honor teams
Santboiana	Baldiri Aleu	3,500	Sant Boi de Llobregat, Catalonia	2019–20 División de Honor teams
Valladolid	Pepe Rojo	5,000	Valladolid, Castile and León	2019–20 División de Honor teams

== Results ==
	ALC	APA	BAR	BAT	CIE	CIS	ELS	HER	IND	ORD	SAN	VAL
Alcobendas		9-36		41-25	33-13	29-13		36-25	50-22	34-28	46-22	31-33
Aparejadores	18-24		28-28			33-29	19-28	42-7	17-28	18-28	35-21	17-31
Barcelona	15-20			24-18	29-0	30-27	29-27			25-25	32-32	14-22
Bathco		20-20	28-33		19-10	33-0		44-6	20-30	26-35		19-38
Ciencias		11-15	23-27	20-19		28-15	12-35	62-17	42-23			27-28
Cisneros	18-17		21-24	24-16	24-16		21-33	39-25		7-24	13-17	
El Salvador	31-33		41-19	22-16	38-5	19-6			46-22	36-35	44-11	
Hernani		24-30	32-31		23-41	20-21	5-17		7-42	15-24	24-27	0-52
Independiente	20-27	38-43	19-14	27-23		49-32	22-23	21-20			26-27	35-35
Ordizia	18-12	44-7	35-37	36-5	48-19		21-24	66-14	17-20			
Santboiana	22-29	43-26		20-14	26-9		14-34	62-7	43-15	30-33		23-22
Valladolid	39-14	41-7	40-20	26-20	41-6	36-20	14-8			10-25	27-7	

== Table ==
	Team	P	W	D	L	F	A	+/-	TF	TA	Bon	Los	Pts
1	Valladolid (c)	17	14	1	2	535	293	242	72	35	9	1	68
2	El Salvador	17	14	0	3	506	304	202	71	37	7	3	66
3	Alcobendas	17	12	0	5	485	398	87	61	46	5	3	56
4	Ordizia	17	11	1	5	542	339	203	65	42	4	5	55
5	Santboiana	17	9	1	7	447	436	11	62	54	3	2	43
6	Barcelona	17	8	3	6	431	438	-7	55	59	1	3	42
7	Independiente RC	17	8	1	8	459	486	-27	57	63	1	4	39
8	Aparejadores	17	7	2	8	411	454	-43	55	56	2	1	35
9	Ciencias	17	5	0	12	344	460	-116	45	61	3	3	26
10	Complutense Cisneros	17	5	0	12	330	449	-119	34	55	1	4	25
11	Bathco Rugby Santander	17	3	1	13	365	412	-47	41	50	2	7	23
12	Hernani	17	1	0	16	271	657	-386	34	94	0	4	8

Champions
Relegation to División de Honor B
