= Club de Rugby Santander =

Spanish rugby union club, based in Santander

Bathco Rugby Club
- Full name: Club de Rugby Santander
- Founded: 2007; 19 years ago
- Location: Santander, Spain
- Ground: Complejo Municipal Deportivo Ruth Beitia (Capacity: 800)
- League: División de Honor
- 2019–20: 11th
Team kit

Official website
- www.bathcorugbyclub.com

Club de Rugby Santander, known for sponsorship reasons as Bathco Rugby Club or simply as Bathco, was a Spanish rugby union team from the city of Santander, founded in 2007. The senior men's first team competed in the top tier of Spanish rugby, the División de Honor de Rugby, and played their matches at the Ruth Beitia Municipal Sports Complex.

== History ==
Since its formation, the club has focused its efforts on the promotion of sport and rugby in particular among the youngest members of society. It currently has more than 180 players, 17 coaches and plays in a total of 9 categories.

The club signed a sponsorship agreement with bathroom supplier Bathco for the 2016–17 season, the year in which the senior team achieved promotion to Division of Honor B from the AON Norte league. For the 2017/2018 season, the agreement was extended and the club was renamed Bathco Rugby Club.

The club has always maintained a great rivalry with the most successful club in the city of Santander, Independiente RC, a team formerly sponsored by Bathco and one with which they currently share a ground.

On 2 June 2019, the club gained promotion to the División de Honor, Spanish rugby's top tier, after defeating CR La Vila in the promotion playoffs.

Their first season in the top tier has proved to be a stern test, and as of 29 February 2020, they lie 11th in the table. The club's current predicament has been hampered by its away form: they are yet to win a single game outside of Cantabria. Their home form has seen some bright spots, with handsome wins against CR Cisneros, Hernani CRE, a close victory over Ciencias Sevilla CR and a draw with UBU Colina Clinic from eight games.

== Club colours ==
The club's home kit is primarily black, with green accents. The away kit is varying shades of green with black and green socks.

The club's crest depicts a blue outline seal balancing a rugby ball on its nose. The seal is surrounded by a blue circle, which is itself surrounded by a green ring bearing the club's name. The animal gives the club its nickname, "las focas", with foca being the Spanish word for seal.

== Stadium ==
Santander shares the Complejo Municipal Ruth Beitia with its city rivals Independiente. The site, run by the Santander city council, is a collection of 35 different facilities for various sports. Due to increased local interest, the derby match between Independiente and Batcho on 29 February was played at the El Malecón stadium in nearby Torrelavega. A narrow 27–21 victory for Independiente meant that the side completed a double over Bathco, having defeated them 30–20 in October 2019.

== Season-by-season record ==
Season	Tier	Division	Pos.	Notes
2016–17	3	AON Norte	1st	↑
2017–18	2	División de Honor B Group A	2nd	
2018–19	2	División de Honor B Group A	1st	↑
2019–20	1	División de Honor de Rugby	11th	↓

== 2018–19 Standings ==
The 2018–19 season saw Bathco win Group A of the second-tier División de Honor B, winning 20 of their 22 games and scoring an average of over 40 points a game. The club qualified for the promotion playoffs.

	Team	P	W	D	L	F	A	+/-	Tries for	Tries against	Try Bonus	Losing Bonus	Points
1	Bathco Rugby Club	22	20	0	2	937	274	663	139	33	18	1	99
2	Getxo R.T.	22	20	0	2	912	255	657	135	31	16	0	96
3	Campus Universitario Ourense RC	22	15	0	7	723	373	350	110	49	15	4	79
4	AVK Bera Bera R.T.	22	16	0	6	667	455	212	96	63	13	1	78
5	CRAT Residencia RIALTA	22	15	0	7	713	493	220	104	66	14	3	77
6	Babyauto Zarautz RT	22	9	1	12	565	668	−103	75	92	8	2	48
7	Uribealdea RKE	22	8	0	14	406	675	−269	53	101	6	2	40
8	VRAC Quesos Entrepinares S23	22	6	2	14	442	598	−156	62	86	5	6	39
9	AVIA Eibar Rugby	22	6	1	15	504	802	−298	70	118	9	4	39
10	SilverStorm El Salvador Emerging S23	22	7	1	14	418	574	−156	57	88	4	3	37
11	Kaleido Universidade de Vigo R.C.	22	6	1	15	413	692	−279	59	102	5	3	34
12	Durango Nissan-Gaursa R.T.	22	1	0	21	251	1092	−841	38	169	2	2	8

Source: http://ferugby.es/clasificacion-division-honor-b-grupo-a

=== Playoffs ===
The club progressed to the promotion playoffs, playing two-legged games against the best-placed finishing teams from other regions. They won five of the six games, losing the final to Ciencias Sevilla CR despite winning the second leg away from home. This victory earned Ciencias automatic promotion, and meant Bathco had to play the promotion/relegation playoff with the side finishing second-from-bottom in the top tier.

Quarterfinals		
CAU Valencia	20–30	Bathco Rugby Club
Bathco Rugby Club	20–6	CAU Valencia
Semi-finals		
C.R. Liceo Francés	34–47	Bathco Rugby Club
Bathco Rugby Club	21–12	C.R. Liceo Francés
Final		
Bathco Rugby Club	15–22	Ciencias Cajasol Olavide
Ciencias Cajasol Olavide	18–23	Bathco Rugby Club

Source: http://ferugby.es/calendario-promocion-division-de-honor

=== Promotion/relegation playoff ===
Promotion was sealed when Bathco won their two-legged tie against La Vila, the team that had finished 11th in the División de Honor.

Relegation/promotion playoff
11th	(Alicante) La Vila	14	39	53
DHB	(Cantabria) Santander	30	27	57
