= Norm Maxwell =

New Zealand rugby union player

- Born: Norman Michael Clifford Maxwell; 5 March 1976 (age 50) Rawene, Northland, New Zealand
- Height: 1.98 m (6 ft 6 in)
- Weight: 106 kg (16 st 10 lb)
- School: Whangarei Boys' High School

Rugby union career
- Position: Lock
Senior career
Years	Team	Apps	(Points)
2010–18	Vigo RC		
Provincial / State sides
Years	Team	Apps	(Points)
1995-97	Northland Canterbury	38	(20)
Super Rugby
Years	Team	Apps	(Points)
1996–2005	Crusaders	75	
International career
Years	Team	Apps	(Points)
1999–2004	New Zealand	36	(25)
–	NZ Schools		
–	New Zealand U-19		

Norman Michael Clifford Maxwell (born 5 March 1976 in Rawene, New Zealand) is a former New Zealand rugby union player.

His usual position was at lock. He initially played for the Hora Hora club and Northland.

On moving to Christchurch his club was Linwood and he played for Canterbury in the NPC and he also represented Crusaders in the Super 12 rugby competition.

Maxwell was educated at Raumanga primary school and Whangarei Boys High School and came to prominence playing for the NZ secondary schools in 1994, after which he represented NZ in the under 19 team in 1995 and the New Zealand colts in 1996 and 1997.

He represented the New Zealand Măori team in 1997-98 and won the award for the most outstanding Măori player in 1999.

He made his All Black debut on 18 June 1999 when he played against Samoa.

In 2000 he played for the UK Barbarians in their 31–41 loss at the Millennium Stadium in Cardiff against South Africa and in 2003 as a substitute for the New Zealand Barbarians in their 17–42 loss against England at Twickenham, London.

In total, Maxwell played 36 test for the All Blacks and scored five (5) tries in the process.

He played his last test for the All Blacks against France on 27 November 2004.

He played the last of his 75 games for the Crusaders in 2005.

== All Blacks Statistics ==
Tests: 36 (0 as captain)
Games: 0 (0 as captain)
Total Matches: 36 (0 as captain)
Test Points: 25pts (5t, 0c, 0p, 0dg, 0m)
Game Points: 0pts
Total Points: 25pts (5t, 0c, 0p, 0dg, 0m)

Awards
Preceded by Tony Brown	Tom French Memorial; Māori rugby union player of the year 1999	Succeeded by Daryl Gibson
