= Nicolás Coronel =

Argentine rugby union player

- Full name: Nicolás Juan Coronel
- Born: 17 October 1991 (age 35) Barcelona, Spain
- Height: 1.85 m (6 ft 1 in)
- Weight: 100 kg (15 st 10 lb; 220 lb)

Rugby union career
- Position: Centre
- Current team: Lazio
Youth career
- Estudiantes de Paraná
Senior career
Years	Team	Apps	(Points)
- Estudiantes de Paraná
2015	Duendes	5	(0)
2015−2016	Santander		
2016−2017	Lazio	15	(27)
2017−2018	Cornish Pirates	14	(5)
2018−2020	Lazio	29	(35)
2020−2021	Rovigo Delta	6	(0)
2021	Lazio		
- Correct as of 12 October 2020
International career
Years	Team	Apps	(Points)
2014−2015	Argentina Sevens	22	(30)
- Correct as of 12 October 2020

Nicolás Juan Coronel (born 17 October 1991, Barcelona) is a Spanish-born Argentine rugby union player. His usual position is as a Centre and he currently plays for Lazio in Top10, after the experience with Rovigo Delta.

From 2014 to 2015 Coronel was named in the Argentina Sevens squad for World Rugby Sevens Series.
