= Vigo RC =

Spanish rugby union club, based in Vigo

(Spain) Rugby Universidade de Vigo
- Full name: Vigo Rugby Club
- Founded: 1988; 38 years ago
- Location: Vigo, Spain
- Ground: Campus As Lagoas-Marcosende (Capacity: 2,000)
- President: Ramón González-Iglesias Babé
- Coach: José María Fernández Alonso
- League: Galician Regional League
- 2024–25: 1st
1st kit	2nd kit

Official website
- vigorugby.com

Vigo Rugby Club (known for sponsorship reasons as Kaleido–Universidade Vigo) is a rugby union club based in Vigo, in the Spanish autonomous community of Galicia. The club competes in the top-flight División de Honor, since 2011–12 season.

== History ==
In 1987, a group of university students arrived in Vigo for their Christmas holiday. They played rugby on one of Vigo's beaches and decided to form a rugby club. The Vigo Rugby Club was founded in 1988 with Quique Paz as the first chairman of the board of directors. It began playing in the Segunda División Regional, and were promoted in their first season to the Primera División Regional.

In 1992, the club was absorbed by the University of Vigo, which took over operations. In 1999, the club regained control of operations, but continued the partnership with the university. They play their home games at Campus As Lagoas-Marcosende on the campus of the University of Vigo.

In 2011, Vigo RC was promoted to the top-flight División de Honor.

== Honours ==
- Copa Xunta: 14
  - Champions: 1992–93, 1993–94, 1997–98, 1998–99, 2001–02, 2002–03, 2003–04, 2005–06, 2006–07, 2007–08, 2008–09, 2009–10, 2010–11, 2011–12

== Season by season ==
Season	Tier	Division	Pos.	Notes
1994–95	2	Primera Nacional	7th	
1995–96	2	Primera Nacional	8th	
1996–97	2	Primera Nacional	7th	
1997–98	2	Primera Nacional	6th	
1998–99	3	Primera Nacional	4th	
1999–00	3	Primera Nacional	3rd	
2000–01	3	Primera Nacional	2nd	
2001–02	3	Primera Nacional	2nd	
2002–03	3	Primera Nacional	3rd	
2003–04	3	Primera Nacional	1st	Promoted
2004–05	2	División de Honor B	5th	

Season	Tier	Division	Pos.	Notes
2005–06	2	División de Honor B	2nd	
2006–07	2	División de Honor B	5th	
2007–08	2	División de Honor B	6th	
2008–09	2	División de Honor B	3rd	
2009–10	2	División de Honor B	5th	
2010–11	2	División de Honor B	2nd	Promoted
2011–12	1	División de Honor	9th	
2012–13	1	División de Honor	10th	
2013–14	1	División de Honor	11th	
2014–15	1	División de Honor	12th	Relegated
2015–16	2	División de Honor B		

- 4 seasons in División de Honor

=== Internationally Capped players ===
- (New Zealand) Campbell Johnstone
- (New Zealand) Norm Maxwell
- (Spain) Marcos Mella
- (Spain) David Monreal
- (Spain) Óscar Ferreras
- (Spain) Carlos Blanco
- (Spain) Alejandro Blanco
- (Spain) Lionel Pardo
- (Spain) Francisco Usero
- (Greece) Vasilis Katsakos
- (Greece) Nikolas Mavreas
- (Scotland) Cameron Wyper
- (Uruguay) Gaston Ibarburu
