= Craig Lyons =

Canadian ice hockey and inline hockey player

- Born: December 25, 1972 (age 53) Calgary, Alberta, Canada
- Height: 6 ft 2 in (188 cm)
- Weight: 195 lb (88 kg; 13 st 13 lb)
- Position: Right wing
- Shot: Left
- Played for: AHL; Springfield Indians; ECHL; South Carolina Stingrays; Long Beach Ice Dogs; Britain; Dumfries Border Vikings; Guildford Flames; IHL; Long Beach Ice Dogs; Utah Grizzlies; WCHL; Fresno Falcons; Fresno Fighting Falcons; Colorado Gold Kings; Long Beach Ice Dogs
- Playing career: 1993–2004

Craig Lyons (born December 25, 1972) is a Canadian former professional ice hockey and inline hockey player.

Lyons played three seasons (1990–1993) of major junior hockey with the Kamloops Blazers of the Western Hockey League (WHL), helping his team to win the 1992 Memorial Cup.

He went on to play eleven seasons of professional hockey, mostly in the West Coast Hockey League (WCHL) where he suited up for 364 regular season contests. He was named to the WCHL First All-Star Team for the 1996–97, 1997–98 and 2000–01 seasons. During the 2000–01 WCHL season he scored 117 points to lead the WCHL in points, and was selected as the WCHL's Most Valuable Player.

Lyons also played four seasons of professional inline hockey with Roller Hockey International, skating with the Sacramento River Rats, Los Angeles Blades, and San Jose Rhinos between 1995 and 1999.

Lyons, along with Kelly Askew, currently operates 'Shoot 2 Score Hockey' in San Clemente, California.

== Awards and honours ==
Award	Year
Memorial Cup with the Kamloops Blazers	1992
WHL (West) Second All-Star Team	1992–93
WCHL First Team All-Star	1996–97
WCHL First Team All-Star	1997–98
WCHL Most Points (117)	2000–01
WCHL First Team All-Star	2000–01
WCHL Most Valuable Player	2000–01
