= Kelly Askew =

Canadian ice hockey player

- Born: November 6, 1971 (age 54) Calgary, Alberta, Canada
- Height: 5 ft 9 in (175 cm)
- Weight: 179 lb (81 kg; 12 st 11 lb)
- Position: Left wing
- Shot: Left
- Played for: Newcastle Cobras (BISL); Frankfurt Lions (DEL); Manchester Storm (BISL); Long Beach Ice Dogs (WCHL); San Diego Gulls (ECHL)
- National team: Canada
- Playing career: 1995–2006

Kelly Askew (born November 6, 1971) is a Canadian former professional ice hockey and inline hockey player.

Following four years of NCAA play with the RPI Engineers men's ice hockey team, Askew played inline hockey with the 1995 New Jersey Rockin' Rollers of Roller Hockey International, and then spent the 1995-96 season with Canada men's national ice hockey team. He went on to play seven seasons in the professional leagues winning the 1998-99 British ice hockey league championship with the Manchester Storm. He was also selected a 2000–01 West Coast Hockey League First Team All-Star.

== Awards and honours ==
| Award | Year |
|---|---|
| WCHL First All-Star Team | 2000–01 |
