= Belenos RC =

Spanish rugby union club, based in Avilés

- Full name: Belenos Rugby Club
- Founded: 1998; 28 years ago
- Location: Avilés, Spain
- Ground: Estadio Santa Bárbara (Capacity: 5,000)
- President: Pablo Avello
- Coach: Claudio Venturino
- League: División de Honor B
Team kit

Belenos Rugby Club, known as Pasek Belenos for sponsorship reasons, is a Spanish rugby union team based in Avilés, in the region of Asturias (Spain). For the season 2026/2027 they play in División de Honor B, third most important league in Spanish rugby.

== Home ground ==
Belenos Avilés play at the Muro de Zaro, which is located in Llaranes in South-east Avilés, with capacity of around 5,000. This stadium was originally built for football; however Belenos managed to use it as home ground following an agreement with Avilés council in 2004. Prior to settling down in their current stadium, the team had been moving to different home grounds throughout the seasons. They started playing in sand pitch of Las Arobias, sand pitch of Ferrota and grass pitches of Pillarno and La Morgal.

In 2020, the club was in talks with Avilés council for building up the first specific infrastructure for rugby in the city and the shire (stadium with stands, gym, toilets, etc).

== Rugby Academy ==
Belenos Avilés RC has a feeder team or B team which play in the regional league for the season 2019/2020. Furthermore, the Asturian club has an agreement with Gijón’s Rugby Calzada rugby union team, which offers Belenos the possibility of picking up certain players upon request. Club’s academy totals an amount of 6 teams in categories U18, U16, U14, U12, U10 and U8, resulting in more than 150 youngsters. Belenos RC also arrange activities such as the Avilés Rugby Cup in 2017, a tournament for rugby academies which congregated not only Asturian clubs but also rugby academies from several other regions in Spain.

== Club Honours ==
- Primera Nacional champions in season 2007/2008.

- Primera Nacional champions in season 2013/2014.
