= Estadio Santa Bárbara =

Stadium in Avilés, Asturias, Spain

- Former names: Campo de Santa Bárbara (1958-1981); Campo Juan Muro de Zaro (1981-2009)
- Location: Camino Sta. Bárbara, 105. 33460, Avilés
- Owner: Avilés city hall
- Capacity: around 5,000 spectators
- Surface: natural grass

Construction
- Opened: 1958

Tenants
- Belenos RC

Estadio Santa Bárbara is a Spanish rugby union and football stadium. It is located in Llaranes, at south-east of Avilés (Asturias).

It was built for the sports use by the ENSIDESA employees in 1958 and was the home stadium of Club Deportivo Ensidesa, as Estadio Juan Muro de Zaro, named after an ENSIDESA economist who was the only chairman of the club. Between 1990 and 1999 it was also the playing field of Real Avilés Club de Fútbol.
