= CR La Vila =

Spanish rugby union club, based in Villajoyosa

La Vila
- Full name: Club de Rugby La Vila
- Founded: 1983; 43 years ago
- Location: Villajoyosa, Valencian Community, Spain
- Ground: Campo de Rugby El Pantano (Capacity: 1,550)
- President: Guillem Carrión
- Coach: Hernan Diego Quirelli (Falu)
- League: División de Honor
- 2023–24: División de Honor B, 1st (Promoted)
| 1st kit | 2nd kit |

Official website
- www.lavilarugby.com

Club de Rugby La Vila is a Spanish rugby union team based in Villajoyosa, Spain.

== History ==
Club de Rugby La Vila was established in 1982 by rugby fans from Villajoyosa city.

The club played in regional divisions until 2008 when it achieved the promotion to División de Honor.

== Trophies ==
- Spanish leagues: 1
  - 2010–11
- Supercopa de España: 1
  - 2011

== Season by season ==
| Season | Tier | Division | Pos. | Notes |
|---|---|---|---|---|
| 2003–04 | 3 | Primera Nacional | 6th | |
| 2004–05 | 3 | Primera Nacional | 2nd | Relegated |
| 2005–06 | 4 | Segunda Nacional | | Promoted |
| 2006–07 | 3 | Primera Nacional | 1st | Promoted |
| 2007–08 | 2 | División de Honor B | 1st | Promoted |
| 2008–09 | 1 | División de Honor | 8th | |
| 2009–10 | 1 | División de Honor | 2nd | |
| 2010–11 | 1 | División de Honor | 1st | League champion |
| 2011–12 | 1 | División de Honor | 4th / QF | |
| 2012–13 | 1 | División de Honor | 12th | Relegated |
| 2013–14 | 2 | División de Honor B | 3rd | |
| 2014–15 | 2 | División de Honor B | 3rd | |
| 2015–16 | 2 | División de Honor B | 3rd | |
| 2016–17 | 2 | División de Honor B | 1st (grupo B) | Promoted |
| 2017–18 | 1 | División de Honor | 10th | |
| 2018–19 | 1 | División de Honor | 11th | Relegated |
| 2019–20 | 2 | División de Honor B | 4th | |
| 2020–21 | 2 | División de Honor B | 1st | Promoted |
| 2021–22 | 1 | División de Honor | 11th | |
| 2022–23 | 1 | División de Honor | 13th | Relegated |
| 2023–24 | 2 | División de Honor B | 1st | Promoted |

- 10 seasons in División de Honor (Last 24-25)
- 8 seasons in División de Honor B

=== International honours ===
- (Spain) Matthew Cook
- (Spain) Rodrigo Martínez Sánchez
- (Spain) Marcos Poggi
- (Spain) Hernán Quirelli
