= Independiente RC =

Spanish rugby union club, based in Santander

(Spain) Independiente Rugby Club
- Full name: Independiente Rugby Club
- Nickname: Verdes (greens) Bisontes (bisons)
- Founded: 1971; 55 years ago
- Location: Santander, Cantabria, Spain
- Ground: San Román de la Llanilla (Capacity: 1,500)
- President: Manuel Sánchez Suárez
Team kit

Official website
- independienterugbyclub1971.com

Independiente Rugby Club is a Spanish amateur rugby union club based in the Cantabrian city of Santander. The club was established in 1971. Independiente plays its home matches at the Mies de Cozada, a multi-use stadium in San Román de la Llanilla. The team traditionally plays in green and white colours.

He is currently not active in any category having given up playing the 2023 - 2024 season in the Honor Division "B" for economic reasons, having not registered his professional players with Social Security and not having paid the corresponding amounts, having a debt of around €280,000 with it.

For several years, the club was known for sponsorship reasons as Bathco Independiente or Bathco, the latter of which is now the name of Club de Rugby Santander.

== Club honours ==
Independiente is the most successful rugby club in Cantabria. The team has played a number of seasons in the División de Honor (1978––80, 2013–present), two seasons in División de Honor B (2003–04 and 2011–12), 25 seasons in Primera Nacional and 1 season in Segunda Nacional.

Spanish tournaments:

- Copa del Rey:
  - Runners-up: 2013–14
- División de Honor B: 1
  - Champions: 2012-13 (group 1)
- Primera Nacional: 6
  - Champions: 1980-81 (group VI), 1981-82 (group XII), 1998-99 (group A), 2000-01 (group A), 2002–03, 2010-11 (group B)
  - Runners-up: 1999-2000 (group A), 2001–02 (group B), 2005-06 (group B), 2009-10 (group B)
- Segunda Nacional: 1
  - Champions: 1982-83 (group X)

Cantabrian tournaments:

- Regional League: 2
  - Champions: 1971-72, 1974–75

In 2012–13 season played in División de Honor B finishing in 1st position in Group A, qualifying for promotion playoffs. On 5 May 2013, Independiente won Alcobendas in the promotion playoffs achieving the promotion to División de Honor 2013–14 after a long spell in minor divisions.

== Season by season ==
Season	Tier	Division	Pos.	Notes
1976–77	2	Primera Nacional	5th	
1977–78	2	Primera Nacional	6th	↑
1978–79	1	División de Honor	6th	
1979–80	1	División de Honor	8th	↓
1980–81	2	Primera Nacional	1st	
1981–82	2	Primera Nacional	1st	
1982–83	3	Segunda Nacional	1st	
1983–84	2	Primera Nacional	7th	
1984–85	3	Segunda Nacional	—	
1985–86	3	Segunda Nacional	—	
1986–87	2	Primera Nacional	9th	
1987–88	3	Segunda Nacional	—	
1988–89	2	Primera Nacional	7th	
1989–90	2	Primera Nacional	9th	
1990–91	3	Segunda Nacional	—	
1991–92	3	Segunda Nacional	—	
1992–93	2	Primera Nacional	12th	
1993–94	3	Segunda Nacional	—	
1994–95	2	Primera Nacional	5th	
1995–96	2	Primera Nacional	6th	
1996–97	2	Primera Nacional	4th	
1997–98	2	Primera Nacional	3rd	
1998–99	3	Primera Nacional	1st	
1999–00	3	Primera Nacional	2nd	

Season	Tier	Division	Pos.	Notes
2000–01	3	Primera Nacional	1st	
2001–02	3	Primera Nacional	2nd	
2002–03	3	Primera Nacional	1st	↑
2003–04	2	División de Honor B	9th	↓
2004–05	3	Primera Nacional	6th	
2005–06	3	Primera Nacional	2nd	
2006–07	3	Primera Nacional	4th	
2007–08	3	Primera Nacional	5th	
2008–09	3	Primera Nacional	6th	
2009–10	3	Primera Nacional	2nd	
2010–11	3	Primera Nacional	1st	↑
2011–12	2	División de Honor B	4th	
2012–13	2	División de Honor B	1st	↑
2013–14	1	División de Honor	4th / SF	Cup runner-up
2014–15	1	División de Honor	4th / QF	
2015–16	1	División de Honor	3rd / SF	
2016–17	1	División de Honor	6th / QF	
2017–18	1	División de Honor	4th / SF	
2018–19	1	División de Honor	8th	
2019–20	1	División de Honor		

== See also ==
- Rugby union in Spain
