= Igor Genua =

- Born: 5 June 1988 (age 38)
- Height: 1.75 m (5 ft 9 in)
- Weight: 89 kg (196 lb)

Rugby union career
- Position: Scrum-half
Senior career
Years	Team	Apps	(Points)
- Hernani CRE
International career
Years	Team	Apps	(Points)
2013–2015	Spain	5	(12)
National sevens team
Years	Team		Comps
- Spain 7s

Igor Genua (born 5 June 1988) is a Spanish rugby union player. He was named in Spain's national rugby sevens team for the 2016 Summer Olympics; and was also in the squad that played at the 2016 Men's Rugby Sevens Final Olympic Qualification Tournament in Monaco.

Genua made his debut for Spain in 2013 against Chile.
