= Matías Tudela =

Spain international rugby union player

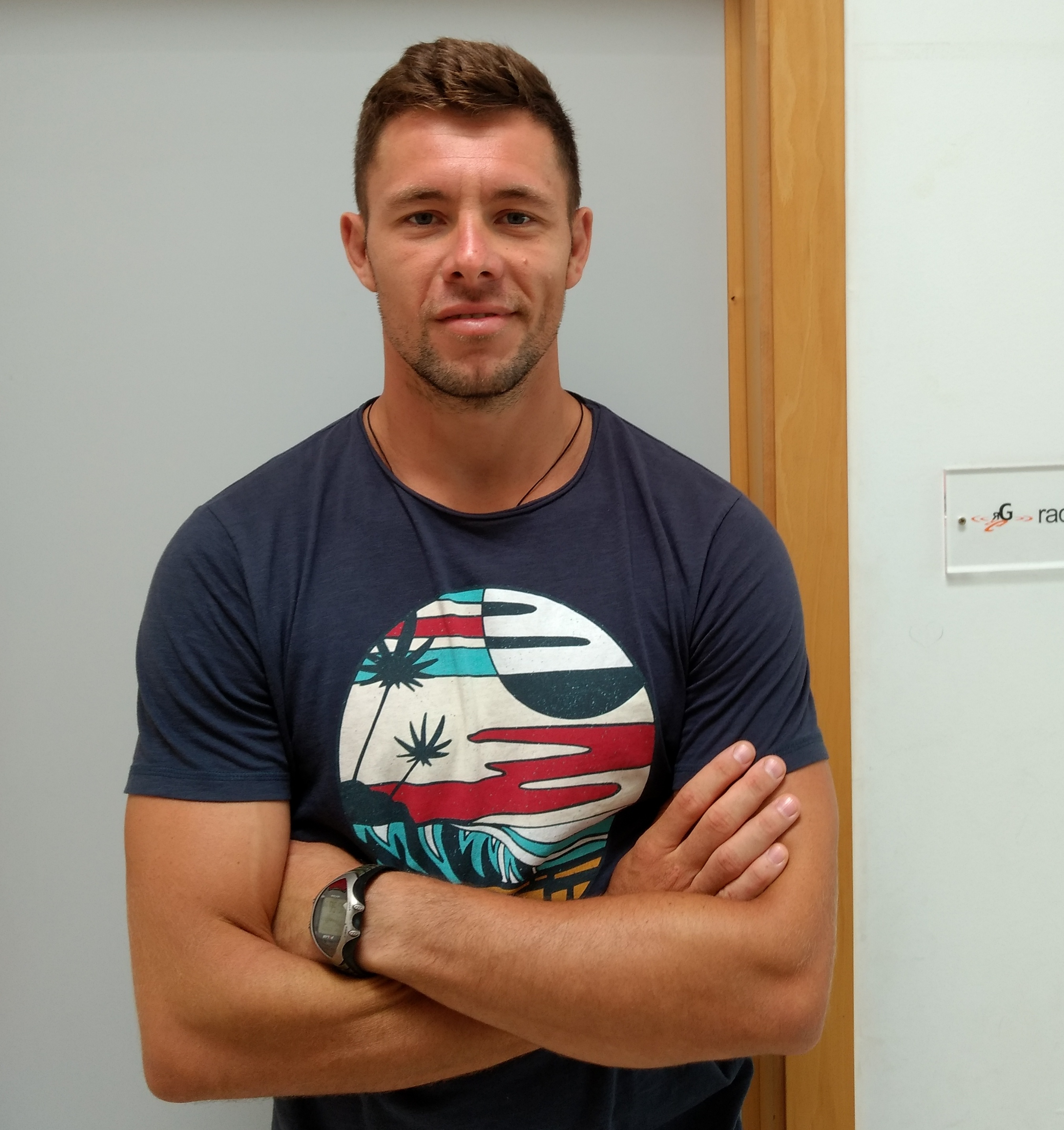
- Spanish rugby union player
- Born: 6 October 1984 (age 42)
- Height: 1.87 m (6 ft 1 1/2 in)
- Weight: 97 kg (214 lb; 15 st 4 lb)

Rugby union career
- Position(s): Fullback, Wing
Senior career
| Years | Team | Apps | (Points) |
- Tatami Rugby Club
International career
| Years | Team | Apps | (Points) |
| 2008-2014 | Spain | 17 | (30) |
National sevens team
| Years | Team | | Comps |
- Spain 7s

Matías Tudela (born 6 October 1984) is a Spanish rugby union player. He represents Spain in rugby sevens and is their current captain. He was part of the team that defeated Samoa to earn the last spot for the 2016 Summer Olympics. Tudela is a member of Spain's national rugby sevens team for the 2016 Summer Olympics.
