= Sam Katz (rugby union) =

English rugby union player

- Full name: Samuel Lee Katz
- Born: 7 September 1990 (age 36) London
- Height: 180 cm (5 ft 11 in)
- Weight: 91 kg (201 lb)
- School: Merchant Taylors' School
- University: Loughborough University

Rugby union career
- Position: Fly Half
- Current team: Arroyo Lions Rugby Club
Senior career
| Years | Team | Apps | (Points) |
| 2021–22 | CR El Salvador | 16 | (158) |
| 2020–21 | Rugby Lyons | 18 | (129) |
| 2019–20 | San Donà | 12 | (53) |
| 2018–19 | Béziers | 20 | (18) |
| 2017–18 | RC Massy | 19 | (16) |
| 2016–17 | Jersey Reds | 15 | (145) |
| 2014–16 | CR El Salvador | 49 | (716) |
International career
| Years | Team | Apps | (Points) |
| 2021-22 | Castilla y León Iberians | 6 | (58) |
| 2013-14 | England Students | 5 | (70) |

Samuel Lee Katz (Born 7 September 1990) is an English rugby union player, currently playing with Spanish División de Honor de Rugby Club El Salvador. His regular position is fly half.

== Career ==
Sam signs for the Spanish División de Honor de Rugby Club El Salvador until 2024.

Rugby Huddle article on Sam Katz's Rugby journey abroad

Sam achieved 91% kicking accuracy in the Italian Top12 Accuracy Stats for 2019/20 Season

Newspaper Article on Sam's game, personality and winning on a drop goal in La Nuova Venezia

Sam was featured in the Rugby World Special Report - The Life of a Journeyman

Sam has said that one of his best moments in Rugby was to play in the King's Cup Final 2016 Copa del Rey de Rugby in April 2016 in a packed 26,500 seater stadium Estadio José Zorrilla in Valladolid, beating rivals Valladolid RAC 13-9 and to receive a winners' medal from King Felipe VI of Spain.

See Sam in an epic slow motion recap of the Copa del Rey as CR El Salvador beat VRAC Quesos Entrepinares 13-9

Sam is one of the founders of the Global Rugby site https://globalrugby.com/ where Players, Coaches and Clubs can find their next opportunities. He is also the host of The Rugby Abroad Podcast https://rugbyabroad.com/ and President of the Arroyo Lions Rugby Club https://www.instagram.com/arroyolionsrugby/
