= Glen Rolls =

Spain international rugby union player

- Full name: Glen Lewis Rolls
- Born: 13 September 1986 (age 40) Napier, New Zealand
- Height: 6 ft 1 in (185 cm)
- Weight: 176 lb (80 kg)
- School: Napier Boys' High School

Rugby union career
- Position: Loose forward
International career
Years	Team	Apps	(Points)
2011–14	Spain	11	(5)

Glen Lewis Rolls (born 13 September 1986) is a New Zealand-born former international rugby union player.

Raised in Napier, Rolls was educated at Napier Boys' High School, where he captained the first XV. He played his rugby primarily as an openside flanker and represented New Zealand at under-17s level.

Rolls relocated to Spain in 2008 to join Valladolid, having been spotted by a Spanish coach while playing in Christchurch rugby with Linwood. Following three-years residency, Rolls qualified for the Spain national team and made his debut in a win over Uruguay in Madrid. He also played for Alcobendas during his nine years in Spain and had a stint in French rugby with Lormont. As a national rugby sevens player, Rolls helped Spain earn Sevens World Series promotion in 2012 and represented his adopted country at the 2013 Rugby World Cup Sevens.

An MBA graduate, Rolls took up a position with football league La Liga in 2017, as the Sydney-based LaLiga Global Network delegate for Australia and New Zealand. He is married to a Spanish physiotherapist.

== See also ==
- List of Spain national rugby union players
