= Hernani CRE =

Spanish rugby union club, based in Hernani

(Spain) Hernani
- Full name: Hernani Club Rugby Elkartea
- Founded: 1965; 61 years ago
- Location: Hernani, Gipuzkoa, Spain
- Ground: Landare Toki (Capacity: 300)
- Chairman: Juan Rodríguez Laburu
- Coach: Patrick Polidori
- League: División de Honor Élite
- 2024–25: División de Honor B Grupo Élite, 7th
Team kit

Official website
- hernanirugby.eus

Hernani Club Rugby Elkartea is a Spanish rugby union club. The club currently competes in the División de Honor Élite competition, the 2nd level of Spanish club rugby. The club are based in the province of Gipuzkoa, in the autonomous community of Basque Country, northern Spain. Hernani play in white, green and red colours.

== Honours ==
- Spanish championship: 0
  - Runners-up: 1979–80, 1980–81, 1981–82, 1983–84
- Copa FER: 1
  - Champions: 1978

== Season by season ==
Season	Tier	Division	Pos.	Notes
1975–76	2	Primera Nacional	1st	
1976–77	2	Primera Nacional	2nd	
1977–78	2	Primera Nacional	1st	↑
1978–79	1	División de Honor	2nd	
1979–80	1	División de Honor	2nd	
1980–81	1	División de Honor	2nd	
1981–82	1	División de Honor	2nd	↓
1982–83	2	Primera Nacional	1st	↑
1983–84	1	División de Honor	2nd	
1984–85	1	División de Honor	10th	↓
1985–86	2	Primera Nacional	1st	↑
1986–87	1	División de Honor	10th	↓
1987–88	2	Primera Nacional	2nd	
1988–89	2	Primera Nacional	4th	
1989–90	2	Primera Nacional	8th	
1990–91	2	Primera Nacional	6th	↓
1991–99	3	Segunda Nacional	—	
1999–00	3	Primera Nacional	6th	
2000–01	3	Primera Nacional	7th	
2001–02	3	Primera Nacional	4th	
2002–03	3	Primera Nacional	3rd	
2003–04	3	Primera Nacional	2nd	↑

Season	Tier	Division	Pos.	Notes
2004–05	2	División de Honor B	3rd	
2005–06	2	División de Honor B	4th	
2006–07	2	División de Honor B	2nd	
2007–08	2	División de Honor B	4th	
2008–09	2	División de Honor B	2nd	
2009–10	2	División de Honor B	1st	
2010–11	2	División de Honor B	4th	
2011–12	2	División de Honor B	1st	↑
2012–13	1	División de Honor	11th/W	
2013–14	1	División de Honor	10th	
2014–15	1	División de Honor	10th	
2015–16	1	División de Honor	10th	
2016–17	1	División de Honor	9th	
2017-18	1	División de Honor	11th / W	
2018-19	1	División de Honor	9th	
2019-20	1	División de Honor	12th	↓
2020-21	2	División de Honor B	3rd/2nd/QF	
2021-22	2	División de Honor B	4th/1st	
2022-23	2	División de Honor B	4th/1st	
2023-24	2	División de Honor B	5th/1st	
2024-25	2	División de Honor B	3rd/7th	↑

- 15 seasons in División de Honor

== See also ==
- Rugby union in Spain
