= Getxo RT =

Spanish rugby union club, based in Getxo

(Spain) Getxo RT
- Full name: Getxo Rugby Taldea
- Founded: 1975; 51 years ago
- Location: Getxo, Biscay, Basque Country
- Ground: Campos Deportivos de Fadura
- Chairman: Alaitz Bollegi
- Coach: Santiago Pérez De Ciriza
- League: División de Honor B
- 2024-25: División de Honor B, 1st (Group A)
1st kit	2nd kit

Official website
- getxorugby.eus

Getxo Rugby Taldea is a Spanish rugby union club. The club currently competes in the División de Honor B de Rugby competition, the 2nd level of Spanish club rugby. The club are based in the province of Biscay, in the autonomous community of Basque Country, northern Spain. Getxo play in yellow and black

== Honours ==
=== Male team ===
- Spanish championship
  - Champions: 1993
- Spanish King's cup
  - Champions: 1990, 1991, 1992 and 1997
  - Runners-up: 1993, 1995 and 2005

=== Female team ===
- European Female Clubs' Cup
  - Runners-up: 2009
- Spanish Queen's cup
  - Champions: 2001 and 2008
  - Runners-up: 2004

== Season by season ==
Season	Tier	Division	Pos.	Notes
1978–79	1	División de Honor	8th	↓
1979–80	2	Primera Nacional	1st	↑
1980–81	1	División de Honor	4th	
1981–82	1	División de Honor	3rd	
1982–83	1	División de Honor	5th	
1983–84	1	División de Honor	9th	↓
1984–85	2	Primera Nacional	1st	↑
1985–86	1	División de Honor	4th	
1986–87	1	División de Honor	4th	
1987–88	1	División de Honor	9th	↓
1988–89	2	Primera Nacional	1st	↑
1989–90	1	División de Honor	4th	Cup champion
1990–91	1	División de Honor	3rd	Cup champion
1991–92	1	División de Honor	5th	Cup champion
1992–93	1	División de Honor	1st	League champion
1993–94	1	División de Honor	2nd	
1994–95	1	División de Honor	2nd	
1995–96	1	División de Honor	3rd	
1996–97	1	División de Honor	2nd	Cup champion

Season	Tier	Division	Pos.	Notes
1997–98	1	División de Honor	8th	
1998–99	1	División de Honor	8th	
1999–00	1	División de Honor	8th	
2000–01	1	División de Honor	9th	
2001–02	1	División de Honor	10th	↓
2002–03	2	División de Honor B	1st	↑
2003–04	1	División de Honor	8th	
2004–05	1	División de Honor	7th	
2005–06	1	División de Honor	5th	
2006–07	1	División de Honor	8th	
2007–08	1	División de Honor	5th	
2008–09	1	División de Honor	10th	↓
2009–10	2	División de Honor B	6th	
2010–11	2	División de Honor B	1st	↑
2011–12	1	División de Honor	5th / SF	
2012–13	1	División de Honor	8th	
2013–14	1	División de Honor	7th	
2014–15	1	División de Honor	9th	
2015–16	1	División de Honor	8th	

- 32 seasons in División de Honor

== See also ==
- Rugby union in Spain
