= Mies de Cozada =

Multi-purpose stadium in San Román de la Llanilla, Spain

Campo Municipal de San Román
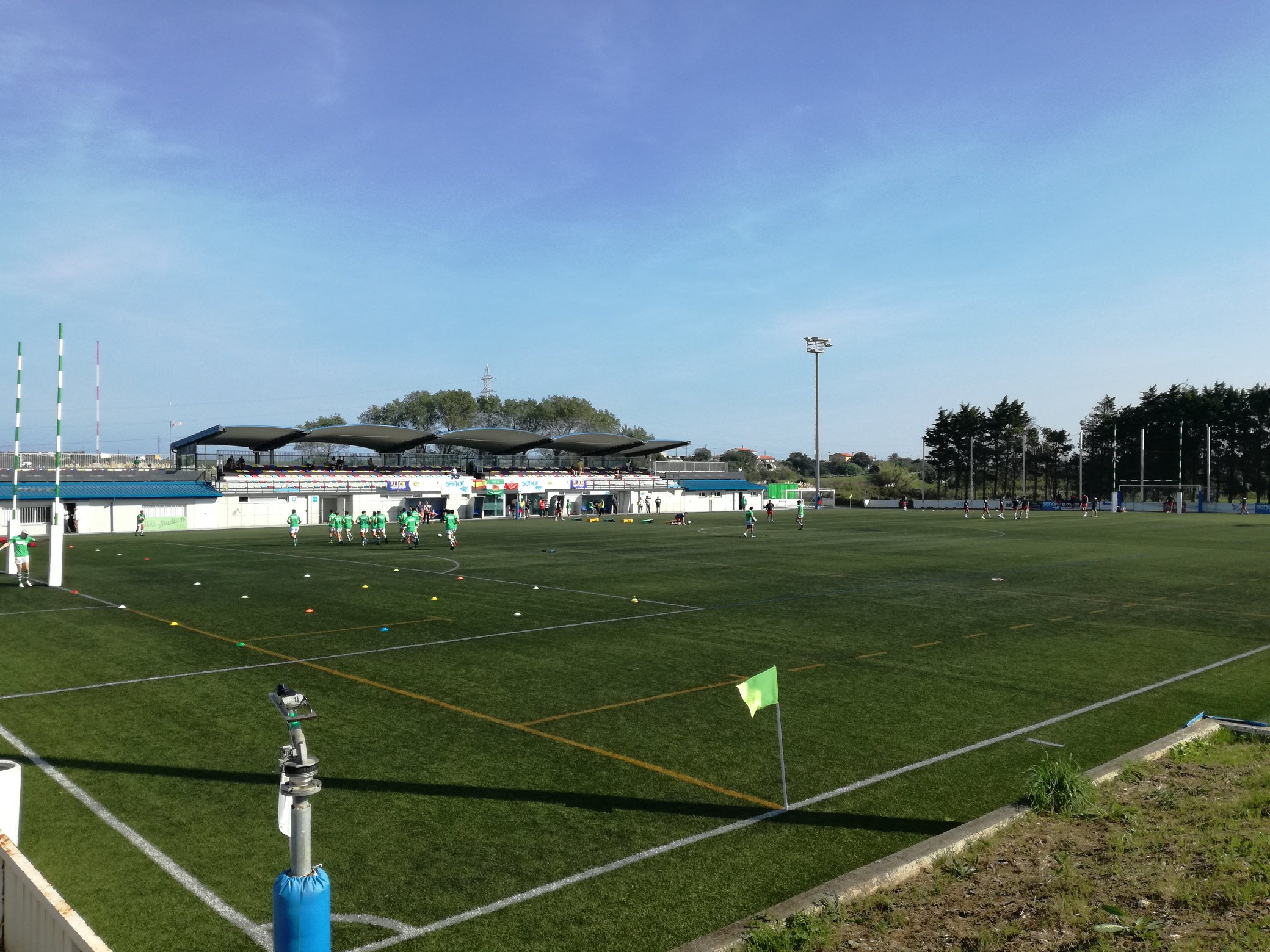
- Interactive map of Campo Municipal de San Román
- Location: San Román de la Llanilla, Cantabria, Spain
- Coordinates: 43°28′11″N 3°51′6″W
- Owner: Ayuntamiento de Santander
- Operator: Ayuntamiento de Santander
- Capacity: 1,500

Construction
- Opened: 2010

Tenants
- BathCo Independiente RC; Rayo Cantabria; Atlético San Román

Campo Municipal de San Román, known also as Mies de Cozada is a multi-purpose municipal stadium located in the town of San Román de la Llanilla, in the municipality of Santander, Cantabria, Spain.

It is an artificial grass field opened in 2010 and holding about 1,500 people. The facilities are used by BathCo Independiente RC for playing rugby in División de Honor and by Rayo Cantabria and Atlético San Román for football practice.

It is located over the Mies de Cozada, the name which the existing natural grass football field historically received.

== See also ==
- Independiente Rugby Club
- División de Honor de Rugby
- Deportivo Rayo Cantabria
