= Estadio Municipal de Altamira =

Sports venue in Spain

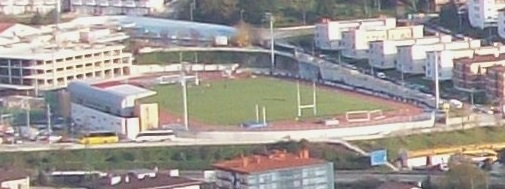
- Aerial view of the Altamira stadium
- Interactive map of Estadio Municipal de Altamira
- Location: Ordizia, Basque Country, Spain
- Coordinates: 43°3′9″N 2°10′21″W
- Owner: Ordizia City Hall
- Capacity: 2000 spectators
- Surface: Artificial grass
- Field size: 100 x 60 m

Construction
- Opened: 1972
- Renovated: 2007 and 2019

Tenants
- Ordizia RE; Ordizia KE

Estadio Municipal de Altamira (Basque: Altamira estadioa) is a sports stadium used for track and field, association football and rugby union, in Ordizia (Gipuzkoa). It is located in the district of Altamira.

== Facilities ==
Built in 1972, its playing surface is artificial grass. Renovated in 2007 with a capacity of 500 seats and later in 2019, increasing the seats in the covered stand to 2,000.

== Main tenants ==
The stadium is used for the home matches of Ordizia RE since its foundation in 1973, although after playing in other nearby cities such as Hernani, Lazkao and Zarautz, and then at Estadio Fernando Trevijano since 1979, Ordizia returned to Altamira during its promotion to División de Honor de Rugby in 2009. The field is also used as home stadium by Ordizia KE in the football regional league.

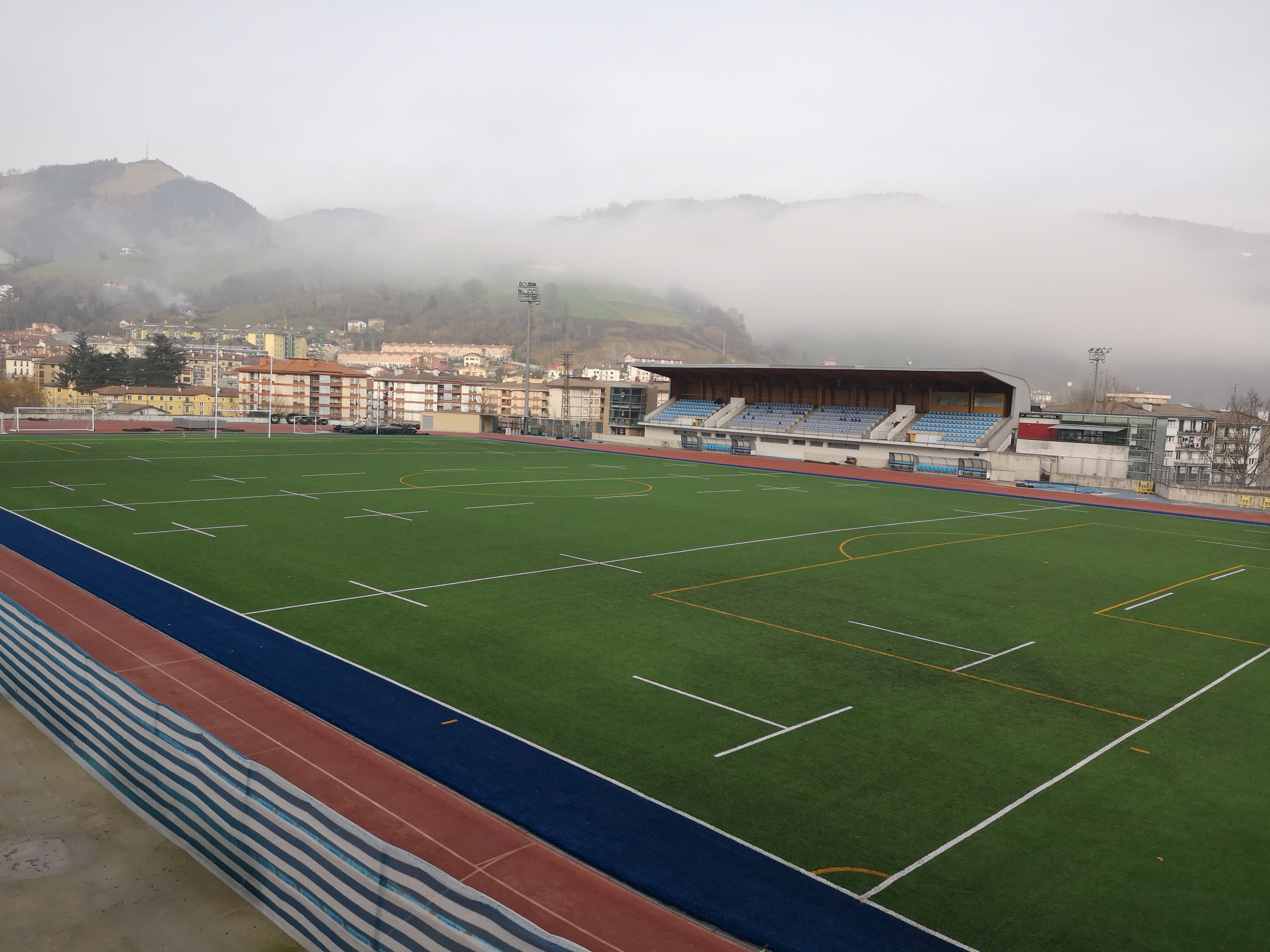
The field seen from the athletics track.
