= Ordizia =

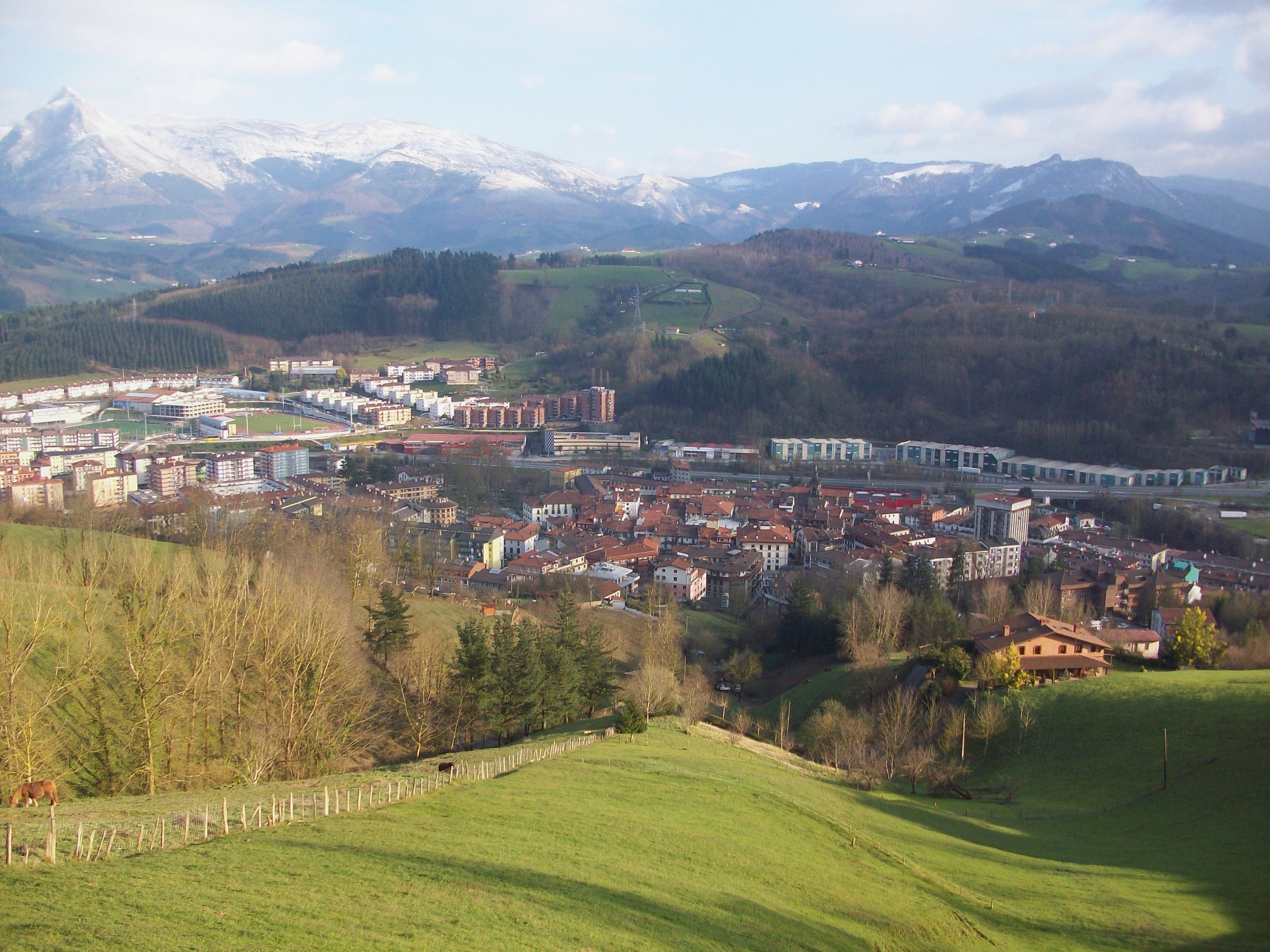
- View of Ordizia

- Coat of arms

- Location of Ordizia within the Basque Country Location of Ordizia within Spain
- Coordinates: 43°3′17″N 2°10′42″W
- Country: Spain
- Autonomous community: Basque Country
- Province: Gipuzkoa
- Comarca: Goierri

Government
  - Mayor: Adur Ezenarro Agirre

Area
  - Total: 5.65 km^{2} (2.18 sq mi)
- Elevation: 153 m (502 ft)

Population (2025-01-01)
  - Total: 10,815
  - Density: 1,910/km^{2} (4,960/sq mi)
- Time zone: UTC+1 (CET)
  - Summer (DST): UTC+2 (CEST)
- Postal code: 20240

Ordizia, formerly known as Villafranca de Ordizia, is a town and municipality located in the Goierri region of the province of Gipuzkoa, in the autonomous community of the Basque Country, northern Spain.

The professional cycle road race Prueba Villafranca de Ordizia is held yearly in Ordizia.
