= Álvar Gimeno =

Spanish rugby union player

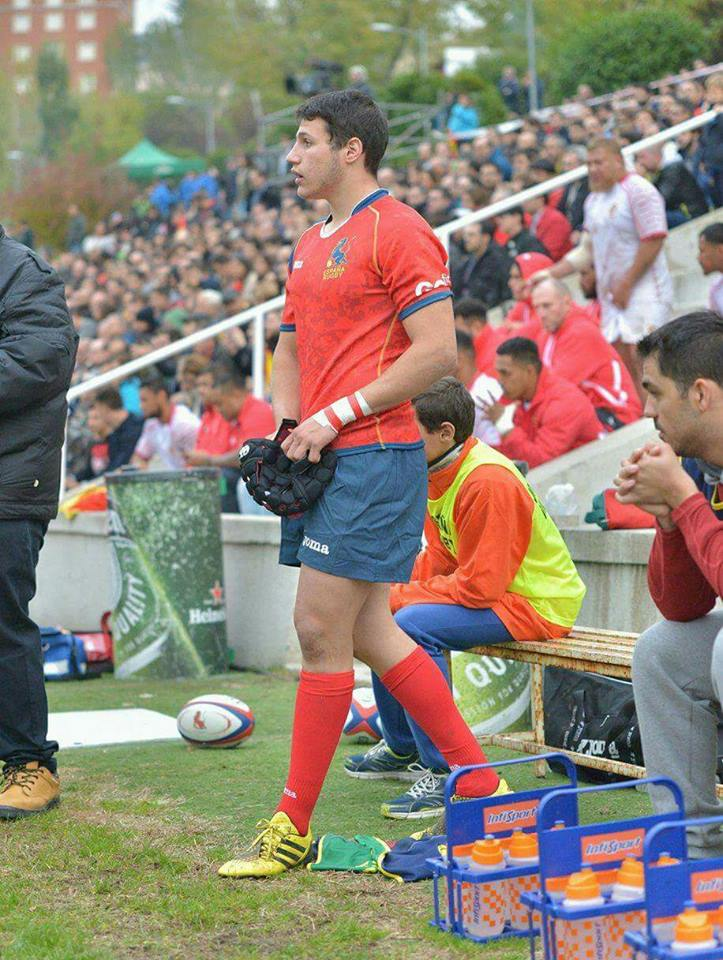
- Full name: Álvar Gimeno Soria
- Born: 15 December 1997 (age 28) Valencia, Spain
- Height: 184 cm (6 ft 0 in)
- Weight: 95 kg (209 lb; 14 st 13 lb)
- School: St. Thomas of Canterbury College
- University: Technical University of Madrid

Rugby union career
- Position(s): Centre, Fly-half
Senior career
Years	Team	Apps	(Points)
2015 – 2017	Complutense Cisneros	27	(33)
2017 – 2019	Valladolid	47	(80)
2019 – 2021	Béziers	25	(10)
2021 – 2022	Valladolid		
2022 – 2023	Belfast RFC		
2023 - 2025	Real Ciencias RC		
2021 - 2022	Castilla y León Iberians	4	(0)
- Correct as of 21 August 2025
International career
Years	Team	Apps	(Points)
2016	Spain U20	3	(0)
2016 -	Spain	48	(55)
- Correct as of 21 August 2025

Álvar Gimeno Soria ([xiˈmeno]; born 15 December 1997) is a Spanish professional rugby union footballer who plays as a centre for the Spain national team. In his youth career, he was selected to play in the 2016 World Rugby Under 20 Championships for Spain and took part in CAU Rugby Valencia age grade representatives teams during secondary school.

== Early life ==
Álvar Gimeno Soria was born on 15 December 1997 in Valencia, the son of Yolanda Soria and Toni Gimeno. Gimeno and his parents migrated to New Zealand when he was twelve-years-old after his father pursued the sport rugby union in the country. Settling in Christchurch, he attended St Thomas of Canterbury College where he excelled in sports playing for the Burnside under-12 rugby side and being personally coached by former Spain international, David Monreal.

== Professional career ==
=== 2015–17 ===
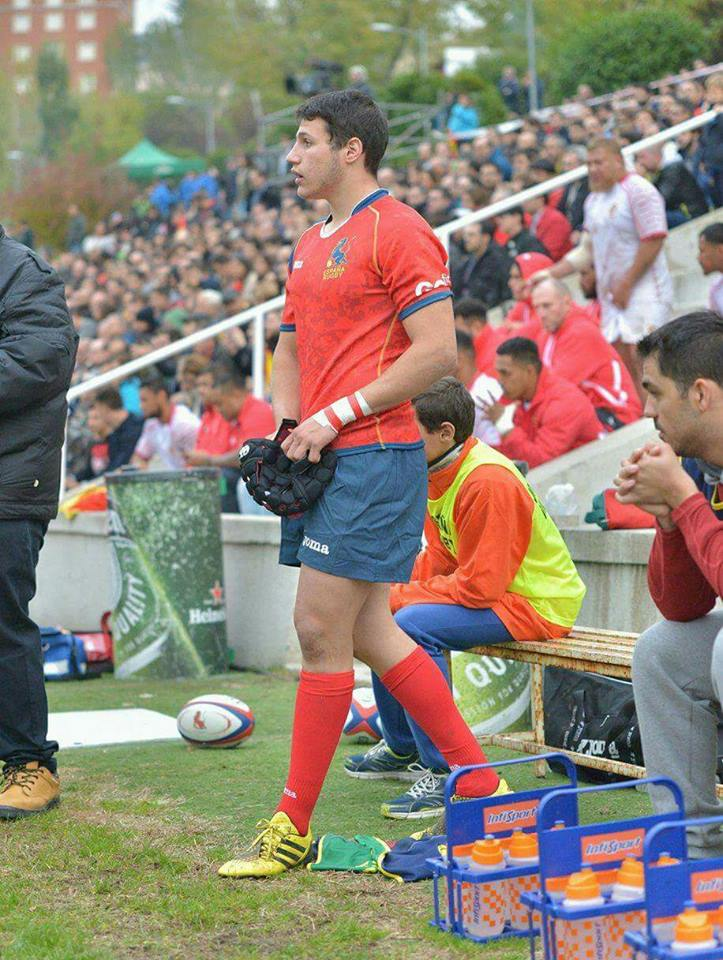
Gimeno during Spain vs. Russia, February 2017

Due to studying INEF at the Technical University of Madrid, Gimeno signed with Complutense Cisneros. He made his professional debut in the División de Honor competition at 17-years-old. He made the match-day fifteen at fly-half against Pozuelo at Valle de las Cañas in September 2015. Gimeno became the youngest rugby player to debut in the league. He reached the semi-finals after overcoming a narrow 25–23 quarter-final victory over Santboiana during the 2015–16 season. Gimeno later sustained an injury after the pain and discomfort that accompanied him throughout the Cisneros campaign and decided to undergo surgery.

Gimeno gained selection honours after being announced in the 27-man Spain national team on 31 May ahead of the 2016 World Rugby Nations Cup. He was one of six potential debutants named. Unavailable to injury, Gimeno was replaced by Jaime Mata and would miss selection in the national squad for the remainder of their campaign in Bucharest, Romania. He was called up for a second time with the national team to play the first friendly match of the 2016 end-of-year internationals against Tonga. He debuted for Spain alongside Matthew Foulds, Kalokalo Gavidi and Fabien Perrin in November, replacing Thibaut Alvarez off the bench in the 69th minute. Gimeno received a yellow card for a dangerous tackle in his second test match against Uruguay.

In September 2016, Gimeno returned to play for Complutense Cisneros in the opening week of the 2016–17 División de Honor season against Ciencias Rugby Sevilla. At season's end, he scored three career tries and featured in the playoffs against Santboiana. His performance at domestic level saw his inclusion in the Spain national sevens team in preparation for the 2017 Hong Kong Sevens qualification tournament.

While there was interest from other professional clubs for Gimeno, he signed a deal with Valladolid after coach Diego Merino Rodríguez confirmed the signing in May 2017. He made his first professional appearance for Valladolid starting in the outside centre position against Barcelona after defeating the side 35–18 in early September. The following week, Gimeno's second consecutive match, he scored his first try for the club during 2017–18 season against Hernani at Landare Toki. Gimeno attributed to Valladolid's División de Honor campaign and their championship and top of the table success after being selected in the side's starting lineup at centre. It was the club's seventh title win.

== Statistics ==
Club	Year	Competition	GP	GS	TRY	CON	PEN	DGL	PTS	WL%	Yellow card	Red card
Complutense Cisneros	2015–16	División de Honor	16	16	1	2	0	1	12	75.00	0	0
Complutense Cisneros	2016–17	División de Honor	11	10	3	3	0	0	21	72.73	0	0
Valladolid	2017–18†	División de Honor	21	17	9	0	0	0	45	100.00	1	0
Valladolid	2018–19†	División de Honor	19	14	7	0	0	0	35	78.95	0	0
Valladolid	2021–22	División de Honor	8	6	0	0	0	0	0	62.50	0	0
Béziers	2019–20	Pro D2	10	8	0	0	0	0	0	70.00	2	0
Béziers	2020–21	Pro D2	15	14	2	0	0	0	10	40.00	1	0
Castilla y León Iberians	2021–22	Rugby Europe Super Cup	4	4	0	0	0	0	0	50.00	0	0
Career			104	89	22	5	0	1	123	73.08	4	0

Updated: 24 April 2022 Source: Álvar Gimeno at ItsRugby.fr (in French)

=== List of international test tries ===
Try	Date	Venue	Opponent	Result	Competition
1	25 November 2017	Rugby Club, Villajoyosa, Spain	Brazil	67–28 (Won)	Brazil Tour
2	3 March 2019	Estadio Nacional Complutense, Madrid, Spain	Romania	21–18 (Won)	Rugby Europe Championship
3	10 March 2019	Estadio Nacional Complutense, Madrid, Spain	Belgium	47–9 (Won)	Rugby Europe Championship

Updated: 15 April 2021 Source: Álvar G Soria Statsguru
