= 2013–14 División de Honor de Rugby =

Spanish rugby union competition

2013–14 División de Honor
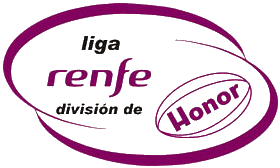
- Countries: Spain
- Champions: Valladolid (5th title)
- Runners-up: El Salvador
- Relegated: Ciencias
- Matches played: 137
- Top point scorer: Brad Linklater, 228
- Top try scorer: Ignacio Contardi, 21

The 2013–14 División de Honor is the 47th season of the top flight of the Spanish domestic rugby union competition since its inception in 1953. Regular season began on 14 September 2013 and finished on 4 May 2014.

The playoff semifinals were played on 18/19 May with the Final taking place on 1 June.

Valladolid successfully defended its 2012–13 season title by defeating city rivals Hermi El Salvador 26–15 in the championship final. Ciencias was the team relegated to División de Honor B 2014–15.

== Competition format ==
The season took place between September and March, with every team playing each other home and away for a total of 22 matches. Points were awarded according to the following:

- 4 points for a win
- 2 points for a draw
- 1 bonus point for a team scoring 4 tries or more in a match
- 1 bonus point for a team that loses a match by 7 points or fewer

The six teams with the highest number of points at the end of 22 rounds of matches played the championship playoffs. The top two teams win a semifinal berth automatically, while the next four teams played off to take the remaining two spots.

The club which finished bottom was relegated, while the club that finished 11th went into a playoff with a team from División de Honor B.

=== Promotion and relegation ===
The bottom team in the standings was relegated to División de Honor B, while the team finishing 11th played the relegation playoff. The top team from División de Honor B was promoted to División de Honor.

== Teams ==
Team	Stadium	Capacity	Location	
Atlético Madrid	Valle de las Cañas	300	Pozuelo de Alarcón, Madrid	2013–14 División de Honor teams
Bizkaia Gernika	Urbieta	2,500	Gernika, Bizkaia	2013–14 División de Honor teams
Ciencias	La Cartuja	1,932	Seville	2013–14 División de Honor teams
Complutense Cisneros	Estadio Complutense	12,400	Madrid	2013–14 División de Honor teams
El Salvador	Pepe Rojo	5,000	Valladolid	2013–14 División de Honor teams
Getxo Artea R.T.	Fadura	1,000	Guecho	2013–14 División de Honor teams
Hernani	Landare Toki	500	Hernani, Gipuzkoa	2013–14 División de Honor teams
Independiente RC	San Román	1,500	Santander, Cantabria	2013–14 División de Honor teams
Ordizia	Altamira	500	Ordizia, Gipuzkoa	2013–14 División de Honor teams
Santboiana	Baldiri Aleu	4,000	Sant Boi de Llobregat	2013–14 División de Honor teams
Universidad de Vigo	Lagoas-Marcosende	3,000	Vigo	2013–14 División de Honor teams
Valladolid	Pepe Rojo	5,000	Valladolid	2013–14 División de Honor teams

== Regular season standings ==
	Team	P	W	D	L	F	A	+/-	Bon	Pts
1	Valladolid	22	17	0	5	591	429	162	17	85
2	El Salvador	22	16	0	6	625	403	222	14	78
3	Complutense Cisneros	22	16	0	6	629	476	153	14	78
4	Independiente RC	22	13	0	9	593	512	81	15	67
5	Atlético Madrid	22	11	0	11	571	539	48	17	61
6	Ordizia	22	12	0	10	522	522	0	12	60
7	Getxo Artea	22	11	0	11	490	428	62	10	54
8	Santboiana	22	10	0	12	477	566	−89	13	53
9	Bizkaia Gernika	22	9	0	13	529	546	−17	14	50
10	Hernani	22	8	0	14	463	643	−180	9	41
11	Universidade Vigo	22	7	0	15	502	686	−184	9	37
12	Ciencias	22	2	0	20	407	649	−242	14	22

Source: Federación Española de Rugby

Qualified for championship playoff semi-finals
Qualified for championship playoff quarter-finals
Relegation playoff
Relegated

== Championship playoffs ==
Quarter-finals
4	(Cantabria) Independiente	20
5	(Community of Madrid) Atlético Madrid	18
3	(Community of Madrid) Complutense Cisneros	29
6	(Basque Country (autonomous community)) Ordizia	27

Semi-finals
1	(Castile and León) Valladolid	29
4	(Cantabria) Independiente	24
2	(Castile and León) El Salvador	22
3	(Community of Madrid) Complutense Cisneros	9

Final
1	(Castile and León) Valladolid	26
2	(Castile and León) El Salvador	15

2013–14 División de Honor winners
(Castile and León)
Valladolid
Fifth title

=== Quarter-finals ===
May 17, 2014	Complutense Cisneros	29–27	Ordizia	Campo Central, Madrid
16:00 (UTC+2)	Try: Manu Sainz 32' c, 34' m Hayali 35' m Paco Hernández 40' m Con: Girão (1/4); Pen: Girão (1/1) 3'	Report	Try: Arraztoa 41' c Tudela 57' c Huxford 82' c Con: Steyl (3/3); Pen: Steyl (2/2) 17', 26'	Referee: Villegas Casado (Castile and León)

May 18, 2014	Independiente RC	20–18	Atlético Madrid	Mies de Cozada, Santander
12:00 (UTC+2)	Try: Rodríguez 5' m Quevedo 53' c Mora 59' m Con: Mateu (1/3); Pen: Mateu (1/1)	Report	Try: Ramírez 10' m Armental 25' c Balbín 35' m Con: Balbín (1/2); Pen: Balbín (1/2) 1'	Referee: Gallastegi Sodupe (Basque Country)

=== Semifinals ===
May 24, 2014	Valladolid	29–24	Independiente RC	Pepe Rojo, Valladolid
17:30 (UTC+2)	Try: Fernández 22' c Abril 32' c López 38' c Herrera 70' m Con: Griffiths (3/4); Pen: Griffiths (1/1) 59'	Report	Try: Mañero 19' c penalty try 56' c Álvarez 79' c Con: García (3/3); Pen: García (1/1) 3'	Attendance: 2,300; Referee: Pedro Montoya (Euskadi)

May 25, 2014	El Salvador	22–9	Complutense Cisneros	Pepe Rojo, Valladolid
16:00 (UTC+2)	Try: Max Vega 51' m Mamea 56' m, 80' c Serrano 74' m Con: Pearce (1/4)	Report	Pen: Girão (3/3) 16', 33', 45'	Attendance: 2,000; Referee: Alhambra Nievas (Andalusia)

==== Final ====
June 1, 2014	Valladolid	26–15	Hermi El Salvador	Pepe Rojo, Valladolid
12:30 (UTC+2)	Try: Gavidi 25' c Vessey 34' m Barnes 59' m Con: Griffiths (1/3); Pen: Griffiths (3/3) 6', 9', 19'	Report	Try: Miranda 49' m V Sánchez 76' c Con: P Rodríguez (1/2); Pen: P Rodríguez (1/1) 15'	Attendance: 5,500; Referee: Iñigo Atorrasagasti (Basque Country)

== Relegation playoff ==
The relegation playoff was contested over two legs by Blusens Universidade Vigo, who finished 11th in División de Honor, and neighbours Sant Cugat, the losing team from División de Honor B promotion playoff final. Vigo won the tie, winning 48-40 on aggregate.

Relegation/promotion playoff
11th	(Galicia (Spain)) Universidade Vigo	10	38	48
DHB	(Catalonia) Sant Cugat	29	11	40

=== 1st leg ===
June 1, 2014	Sant Cugat	29–10	Universidade Vigo	La Guinardera, Sant Cugat del Vallès
12:00 (UTC+2)	Try: Lafuente 13' m Pla 22' c Losada 37' c Granell 48' c Con: Berasategui (3/4); Pen: Berasategui (1/1) 67'	Report	Try: Tatafu 52' c Con: Simon (1/1); Pen: Simon (1/1) 33'	Referee: Rafael Ortega (Andalusia)

=== 2nd leg ===
June 7, 2014	Universidade Vigo	38–11	Sant Cugat	Lagoas-Marcosende, Vigo
17:40 (UTC+2)	Try: Tito 3' m de Cabo 23' m Berlande 27' m Monreal 43' c Tatafu 58' c Con: Simon (2/5); Pen: Simon (3/3) 17', 45', 76'	Report	Try: Gómez 39' m Con: Berasategui (0/1); Pen: Berasategui (1/2) 13'; Drop: Berasategui (1/1) 25'	Attendance: 1,000; Referee: Félix Villegas (Castile and León)

Blusens Universidade Vigo won 48–40 on aggregate and remained in División de Honor for 2014–15 season.

== Scorers statistics ==
=== By try points ===
Player	Try points	Team
(Spain) Ignacio Contardi	110	Independiente RC
(Spain) Iñigo Olaeta	75	Bizkaia Gernika
(New Zealand) Afa Tauli	70	Santboiana
(Argentina) Federico Casteglioni	65	Bizkaia Gernika
(Spain) Pedro Martín	60	Valladolid
(Tonga) Maka Tatafu	55	Universidade Vigo
(Portugal) Tiago Girão	55	Complutense Cisneros
(New Zealand) Simeon James	55	Getxo Artea
(England) Tom Pearce	55	Bizkaia Gernika
(South Africa) Heinrich Steyl	50	Ordizia

=== By total points ===
Player	Points	Team
(New Zealand) Brad Linklater	228	Getxo Artea
(Portugal) Tiago Girão	218	Complutense Cisneros
(Spain) Pedro Rodríguez	190	El Salvador
(Spain) Iñigo Balbín	190	Atlético Madrid
(England) Gareth Griffiths	189	Valladolid
(South Africa) Heinrich Steyl	173	Ordizia
(Spain) Iñigo Olaeta	147	Bizkaia Gernika
(Spain) Mariano García	146	Independiente RC
(Spain) Igor Genua	141	Hernani
(France) Jérémy Simon	124	Universidade Vigo

== See also ==
- 2013–14 División de Honor B de Rugby
