= 2024–25 División de Honor de Rugby =

Spanish rugby union competition

2024–25 División de Honor
- Countries: Spain
- Date: 6 October 2024

The 2024–25 División de Honor is the 58th season of the División de Honor, the top flight of Spanish domestic rugby union.

El Salvador won the title for the 9th time, defeating Cisneros in the final.

== Competition format ==
The season takes place between October and May.

Points are awarded as follows:

- 4 points for a win
- 2 points for a draw
- 1 bonus point for a team scoring 4 tries or more in a match
- 1 bonus point for a team that loses a match by 7 points or fewer

Each team plays eleven games - one game against each opponent. Then the league divides into two groups: the top six teams progress to Group A and the remaining six teams progress to Group B. The teams play five additional games, facing the other members of their groups once more.

Eight teams progress through to the playoffs, meaning the top two teams from Group B qualify along with the six teams from Group A.

=== Promotion and relegation ===
The second-tier División de Honor B is made up of three regional groups. The top eight teams across the three groups play off; the champion is promoted to División de Honor.

For both the 2024/25 and 2025/26 seasons, two teams would be relegated, bringing the league's total to 10 teams.

== Teams ==
Belenos RC were relegated while CR La Vila were promoted.

Team	Stadium	Capacity	Location	
Alcobendas	Las Terrazas	2,000	Alcobendas, Madrid	Current División de Honor teams
Aparejadores	San Amaro	1,000	Burgos, Castile and León	Current División de Honor teams
Ciencias	Instalaciones Deportivas La Cartuja	3,000	Seville, Andalusia	Current División de Honor teams
Complutense Cisneros	Estadio Complutense	12,400	Madrid, Madrid	Current División de Honor teams
El Salvador	Pepe Rojo	5,000	Valladolid, Castile and León	Current División de Honor teams
FC Barcelona	La Teixonera	500	Barcelona, Catalonia	Current División de Honor teams
La Vila	Campo de Rugby “El Pantano”	1,550	La Vila Joiosa, Valencia	Current División de Honor teams
Les Abelles	Polideportivo de Quatre Carreres	500	Valencia, Valencia	Current División de Honor teams
Ordizia	Altamira	2,000	Ordizia, Basque Country	Current División de Honor teams
Pozuelo	Valle de las Cañas	500	Pozuelo de Alarcón, Madrid	Current División de Honor teams
Santboiana	Baldiri Aleu	3,500	Sant Boi de Llobregat, Catalonia	Current División de Honor teams
Valladolid	Pepe Rojo	5,000	Valladolid, Castile and León	Current División de Honor teams

== Results and standings ==
	ALC	APA	CIE	CIS	ELS	FCB	LAV	LES	ORD	POZ	SAN	VAL
Alcobendas	—	6 - 9	31 - 25	19 - 12	32 - 13	33 - 10		47 - 30	48 - 29		30 - 17	21 - 28
Aparejadores	32 - 25	—	62 - 5		15 - 3			52 - 12	45 - 17	60 - 13	51 - 22	23 - 25
Ciencias	18 - 33	27 - 20	—	23 - 13	41 - 18	46 - 25				59 - 0	17 - 44	21 - 28
Complutense Cisneros		26 - 31		—		27 - 20	40 - 21	77 - 17	20 - 18	38 - 27	29 - 33	10 - 35
El Salvador	17 - 16	13 - 12	28 - 22	20 - 13	—	24 - 22	28 - 21				30 - 13	14 - 12
FC Barcelona		22 - 31		43 - 41		—	24 - 23	25 - 8	20 - 28	30 - 29	17 - 27	3 - 26
La Vila	19 - 36	15 - 19	30 - 30	36 - 24		34 - 37	—	71 - 12	31 - 43	27 - 20		
Les Abelles			24 - 37	27 - 52	14 - 17	20 - 44	29 - 34	—	10 - 21	44 - 24		
Ordizia			25 - 20	24 - 47	28 - 33	23 - 30	26 - 17	66 - 7	—	20 - 14		
Pozuelo	23 - 54			21 - 27	18 - 36	29 - 39	25 - 17	54 - 14	38 - 36	—	16 - 31	7 - 38
Santboiana	20 - 23	23 - 25	32 - 31		14 - 21		24 - 21	33 - 34	43 - 15		—	29 - 28
Valladolid	31 - 3	45 - 10	36 - 7		17 - 13		45 - 22	69 - 8	26 - 10		46 - 34	—

Sources: FE Rugby First Phase, Second Phase Group A, Second Phase Group B

=== First phase ===
	Team	P	W	D	L	F	A	+/-	TF	TA	+/-	BP	Los	Pts
1	Valladolid	11	10	0	1	373	153	220	54	18	36	7	1	48
2	El Salvador	11	10	0	1	250	197	53	28	23	5	2	1	43
3	Aparejadores	11	8	0	3	376	217	159	54	24	30	4	3	39
4	Alcobendas	11	8	0	3	353	245	108	47	33	14	3	3	38
5	Santboiana	11	7	0	4	320	272	48	45	35	10	3	3	34
6	Ciencias	11	5	1	5	313	276	37	38	31	7	2	3	27
7	Complutense Cisneros	11	4	0	7	291	295	-4	38	41	-3	2	4	22
8	FC Barcelona	11	4	0	7	241	308	-67	29	43	-14	0	2	18
9	La Vila	11	3	1	7	276	318	-42	38	42	-4	0	4	18
10	Ordizia	11	3	0	8	254	357	-103	27	46	-19	0	3	15
11	Pozuelo	11	2	0	9	245	423	-178	32	62	-30	1	2	11
12	Les Abelles	11	1	0	10	210	441	-231	28	60	-32	0	2	5

Source: FE Rugby

Qualified for Group A
Qualified for Group B

=== Second phase ===
Group A

	Team	P	W	D	L	F	A	+/-	TF	TA	+/-	Bon	Los	Pts
1	Valladolid	16	14	0	2	535	235	300	78	28	50	10	2	68
2	Aparejadores	16	12	0	4	497	299	198	69	34	35	5	3	56
3	Alcobendas	16	11	0	5	457	333	124	59	42	17	5	4	53
4	El Salvador	16	12	0	4	328	310	18	37	36	1	3	1	52
5	Santboiana	16	8	0	8	439	434	5	58	56	2	3	4	39
6	Ciencias	16	6	1	9	429	449	-20	52	55	-3	2	5	33

Source: FE Rugby

Group B

	Team	P	W	D	L	F	A	+/-	TF	TA	+/-	Bon	Los	Pts
1	Complutense Cisneros	16	8	0	8	496	415	81	68	58	10	4	5	41
2	FC Barcelona	16	8	0	8	411	449	-38	51	61	-10	1	2	35
3	Ordizia	16	7	0	9	429	449	-20	53	57	-4	1	4	32
4	La Vila	16	4	1	11	439	462	-23	61	62	-1	1	5	24
5	Pozuelo	16	3	0	13	358	570	-212	47	83	-36	1	4	17
6	Les Abelles	16	2	0	14	310	723	-413	42	103	-61	0	2	10

Source: FE Rugby

Qualified for playoff quarterfinals
Relegation to División de Honor B

== Playoffs ==
Quarter finals
1	(Castile and León) Valladolid	57
8	(Catalonia) FC Barcelona	17
4	(Castile and León) El Salvador	20
5	(Catalonia) Sainboiana	18
3	(Community of Madrid) Alcobendas	53
6	(Andalusia) Ciencias	19
2	(Castile and León) Aparejadores	24
7	(Community of Madrid) Cisneros	25

Semifinals
(Castile and León) Valladolid	20
(Castile and León) El Salvador	24
(Community of Madrid) Alcobendas	7
(Community of Madrid) Cisneros	12

Final
(Castile and León) El Salvador	14
(Community of Madrid) Cisneros	11

Source: FE Rugby

== Copa del Rey ==
The twelve teams were divided into four groups of three. The league matches between these teams also counted as cup matches, and the winner of each group qualified for the semifinals.

Group 1: Alcobendas, La Vila, Complutense
Group 2: El Salvador, Aparejadores, Ordizia
Group 3: FC Barcelona, Santboiana, Pozuelo
Group 4: Valladolid, Ciencias, Les Abelles

=== Semifinals ===
The winner of each group proceeded to the semifinals of the cup, which were one-legged ties.

22 December 2024

(Community of Madrid) Alcobendas	16-24	(Castile and León) Valladolid

22 December 2024

(Catalonia) FC Barcelona	13-29	(Castile and León) El Salvador

=== Final ===
24 May 2025

(Castile and León) El Salvador	3-27	(Castile and León) Valladolid

FE Rugby
