= Iñaki Mateu =

Spain international rugby union player

- Full name: Iñaki Martin Spuches Mateu
- Born: 17 March 1997 (age 29) Tucumán, Argentina
- Height: 1.80 m (5 ft 11 in)
- Weight: 90 kg (14 st 2 lb; 198 lb)

Rugby union career
- Position: Centre
- Current team: Recoletas Burgos Caja Rural
Youth career
- Sanitas Alcobendas
- –: Universitario Rugby Club de Tucumán
Senior career
Years	Team	Apps	(Points)
2016−2018	Sanitas Alcobendas	38	(103)
2020−2022	Viadana	13	(10)
2022−2023	Ciencias Sevilla CR		
2023−	Recoletas Burgos Caja Rural		
- Correct as of 18 March 2025
International career
Years	Team	Apps	(Points)
2016−2017	Spain Under 20		
2017−	Spain	27	(24)
2018−2020	Spain Sevens	86	(117)
- Correct as of 18 March 2025

Iñaki Mateu (born 17 March 1997 in Tucumán) is an Argentine-born Spanish rugby union player. His usual position is as a centre and he currently plays for Recoletas Burgos Caja Rural.

He played for Italian tema Viadana in Top12, from 2020 to 2022.

In 2016 and 2017 Mateu was named in the Spain Under 20 squad and from 2018 he is part of the Spain Sevens squad to participate at the annualWorld Rugby Sevens Series and the Sevens Grand Prix Series. From 2017 to 2018, he was also named in the Spain squad for the World Rugby Nations Cup and Rugby Europe Championship.
