= 2023–24 División de Honor de Rugby =

2023–24 División de Honor
- Countries: Spain
- Date: 1 October 2023
- Champions: Valladolid RAC
- Runners-up: Aparejadores Rugby
- Promoted: CR La Vila
- Relegated: Belenos RC

The 2023–24 División de Honor is the 57th season of the División de Honor, the top flight of Spanish domestic rugby union.

Valladolid won its seventh title in eight years, its thirteenth overall, defeating local rivals El Salvador in the final.

== Competition format ==
The season took place between October and May.

Points were awarded as follows:

- 4 points for a win
- 2 points for a draw
- 1 bonus point for a team scoring 4 tries or more in a match
- 1 bonus point for a team that loses a match by 7 points or fewer

Each team played eleven games - one game against each opponent. Then the league divided into two groups: the top six teams progressed to Group A and the remaining six teams progressed to Group B. The teams played the other members of their groups once more.

Eight teams progressed through to the playoffs, meaning the top two teams from Group B qualified along with the six teams from Group A.

=== Promotion and relegation ===
The second-tier División de Honor B is made up of three regional groups. The top eight teams across the three groups play off; the champion is promoted to División de Honor, at the expense of the team which finishes last in the División de Honor.

The runner-up plays a further playoff against the team which finishes 11th in the top flight.

== Teams ==
Gernika RT and La Vila were relegated while Alcobendas were promoted.

Team	Stadium	Capacity	Location	
Alcobendas	Las Terrazas	2,000	Alcobendas, Madrid	Current División de Honor teams
Aparejadores	San Amaro	1,000	Burgos, Castile and León	Current División de Honor teams
Ciencias	Instalaciones Deportivas La Cartuja	3,000	Seville, Andalusia	Current División de Honor teams
Complutense Cisneros	Estadio Complutense	12,400	Madrid, Madrid	Current División de Honor teams
El Salvador	Pepe Rojo	5,000	Valladolid, Castile and León	Current División de Honor teams
FC Barcelona	La Teixonera	500	Barcelona, Catalonia	Current División de Honor teams
Belenos RC	Estadio Yago Lamela	1,163	Avilés, Asturias	Current División de Honor teams
Les Abelles	Polideportivo de Quatre Carreres	500	Valencia, Valencia	Current División de Honor teams
Ordizia	Altamira	2,000	Ordizia, Basque Country	Current División de Honor teams
Pozuelo	Valle de las Cañas	500	Pozuelo de Alarcón, Madrid	Current División de Honor teams
Santboiana	Baldiri Aleu	3,500	Sant Boi de Llobregat, Catalonia	Current División de Honor teams
Valladolid	Pepe Rojo	5,000	Valladolid, Castile and León	Current División de Honor teams

== Results and standings ==
=== First phase ===
Aparejadores set the pace in the first phase of the season, winning ten games out of eleven and scoring more than 40 points on six occasions.

	ALC	APA	BEL	CIE	CIS	ELS	FCB	LES	ORD	POZ	SAN	VAL
Alcobendas	—			44–38		43–34	28–29		29–30	31–23		
Aparejadores	48–26	—	66–13		40–26	26–8			52–24		32–10	
Belenos RC	23–26		—		45–28			30–20			32–36	0–31
Ciencias		22–28	25–20	—		31–14		25–25	29–19			14–19
Complutense Cisneros	41–21			14–22	—	16–21	32–39			24–3		
El Salvador			33–5			—		30–10	50–20		17–17	0–27
FC Barcelona		17–45	40–37	26–38		39–15	—		17–22	13–30		
Les Abelles	0–21	32–28			0–22		38–15	—		43–28	14–24	
Ordizia			34–35		19–38			10–15	—		44–38	18–28
Pozuelo		5–45	34–0	12–57		22–42			7–26	—		13–24
Santboiana	10–19			16–15	34–19		45–42			30–13	—	
Valladolid	7–0	24–31			31–10		47–8	34–0			43–20	—

The first phase concluded in January 2024, with five of the six teams which qualified for Group A being the same as 2022-23.

	Team	P	W	D	L	F	A	+/-	TF	TA	+/-	BP	Los	Pts
1	Aparejadores	11	10	0	1	441	207	234	61	22	39	8	1	49
2	Valladolid	11	10	0	1	315	114	201	39	9	30	6	1	47
3	Ciencias	11	6	1	4	316	237	79	39	26	13	2	4	32
4	Alcobendas	11	6	0	5	288	283	5	35	39	-4	0	3	28
5	Santboiana	11	6	1	4	280	290	-10	29	31	-2	1	0	28
6	El Salvador	11	5	1	5	264	256	8	33	31	2	2	0	24
7	Complutense Cisneros	11	4	0	7	270	275	-5	30	37	-7	1	2	19
8	FC Barcelona	11	4	0	7	285	377	-92	39	46	-7	1	2	19
9	Ordizia	11	4	0	7	266	338	-78	19	36	-17	0	2	18
10	Les Abelles	11	4	1	6	197	267	-70	27	33	-6	0	0	16
11	Belenos RC	11	3	0	8	240	373	-133	30	51	-21	0	4	16
12	Pozuelo	11	2	0	9	190	335	-145	20	40	-20	1	0	9

Qualified for Group A
Qualified for Group B

=== Second phase ===
Valladolid's final game was cancelled when their opponents, Ciencia, announced they would not take part. Ciencia's players refused to play after not being paid by the club, which in turned blamed its sponsor and the local council for reneging on promised payments.

Group A

	Team	P	W	D	L	F	A	+/-	TF	TA	+/-	Bon	Los	Pts
1	Aparejadores	16	14	0	2	551	302	249	73	30	43	8	2	66
2	Valladolid	15	12	0	3	400	205	195	51	20	31	6	2	56
3	Ciencias	15	9	1	5	435	283	152	55	31	24	4	5	47
4	El Salvador	16	8	1	7	372	337	35	46	42	4	4	1	39
5	Alcobendas	16	7	0	9	367	395	-28	43	53	-10	0	5	34
6	Santboiana	16	7	1	8	338	424	-86	38	54	-16	1	2	33

Group B

	Team	P	W	D	L	F	A	+/-	TF	TA	+/-	Bon	Los	Pts
1	Complutense Cisneros	16	8	0	8	444	393	51	52	52	0	2	3	37
2	Les Abelles	16	7	1	8	304	377	-73	39	45	-6	0	2	30
3	Ordizia	16	6	0	10	392	453	-61	42	52	-10	1	4	29
4	Pozuelo	16	6	0	10	334	451	-117	35	54	-19	1	1	26
5	FC Barcelona	16	5	0	11	393	510	-117	50	61	-11	1	5	26
6	Belenos RC	16	4	0	12	348	548	-200	44	74	-30	0	5	21

Qualified for playoff quarterfinals
Relegation playoff
Relegation to División de Honor B

== Playoffs ==
The season climaxed with three extremely close games in the semifinals and final, with Valladolid prevailing over local rivals El Salvador to win their second consecutive title.

Quarter finals
1	(Castile and León) Aparejadores	53
8	(Valencian Community) Les Abelles	7
4	(Castile and León) El Salvador	36
5	(Community of Madrid) Alcobendas	17
2	(Castile and León) Valladolid	30
7	(Community of Madrid) Complutense	21
3	(Andalusia) Ciencias	37
6	(Catalonia) Saintboiana	15

Semifinals
(Castile and León) Aparejadores	16
(Castile and León) El Salvador	12
(Castile and León) Valladolid	14
(Andalusia) Ciencias	10

Final
(Castile and León) El Salvador	19
(Castile and León) Valladolid	20

== Relegation playoff ==
The relegation playoff was played over two legs by Barcelona, the team finishing 11th in División de Honor, and Ingenieros Industriales Las Rozas, the losing team from the División de Honor B promotion playoff final. Barcelona won the game 34-3, retaining their place in the División de Honor for the 2024–25 season.

=== Relegation Playoff ===
2 May 2024

(Catalonia) Barcelona	34-3	(Community of Madrid) Las Rozas

== Copa del Rey ==
The Copa del Rey returned to its 2021-22 format; the twelve teams were divided into four groups of three. The league matches between these teams also counted as cup matches, and the winner of each group qualified for the semifinals.

Group A: Les Abelles, Pozuelo, Valladolid
Group B: Alcobendas, Barcelona, Aparejadores
Group C: Real Ciencias, Santboiana, Pasek Belenos
Group D: Ordizia, Complutense Cisnerosm El Salvador

=== Semifinals ===
The winner of each group proceeded to the semifinals of the cup, which were one-legged ties.

11 February 2024

(Castile and León) El Salvador	6-15	(Castile and León) Valladolid

11 February 2024

(Castile and León) Aparejadores	32-17	(Catalonia) Santboiana

=== Final ===
The final was a rematch of the 2023 final, but was won this time by Aparejadores, who denied Valladolid a second consecutive double.

4 May 2024

(Castile and León) Valladolid	19-20	(Castile and León) Aparejadores
