= 2020–21 División de Honor de Rugby =

Spanish rugby union competition

2020–21 División de Honor
- Countries: Spain
- Date: 24 October 2020 -
- Champions: Valladolid
- Runners-up: Alcobendas
- Promoted: La Vila, Gernika
- Relegated: Independiente RC, Getxo Artea

The 2020–21 División de Honor is the 54th season of the División de Honor, the top flight of Spanish domestic rugby union.

Valladolid won its fifth consecutive title, its eleventh overall, defeating Alcobendas in the final.

== Competition format ==
The División de Honor de Rugby season takes place between October and May. The COVID-19 pandemic delayed and affected the competition. Bathco withdrew from the competition due to financial issues, and were replaced with Les Abelles, who beat Hernani, the team which had finished in 12th place in the 2019-20 season, in a playoff.

The pandemic also meant the format for the 2020-21 tournament was altered:

- Each team played each other once, with the top four teams qualifying for the Copa del Rey semifinals, played 1-2 May.
- The league then divided into two groups of six, based on the league table after 11 games.
- The results between the teams in each group were carried forward to the second stage, and they played each other again. The regular season was thus reduced to 16 games each instead of the usual 22.
- There were eight playoff positions instead of six, meaning the top two from the second group qualified along with all teams from the first group.

Points were awarded according to the following:

- 4 points for a win
- 2 points for a draw
- 1 bonus point for a team scoring 4 tries or more in a match
- 1 bonus point for a team that loses a match by 7 points or fewer

=== Promotion and relegation ===
The second-tier División de Honor B is made up of three regional groups. The top eight teams across the three groups play off; the champion is promoted to División de Honor, at the expense of the team which finishes last in the División de Honor.

The runner-up plays a further play-off against the team which finishes 11th in the top flight.

== Teams ==
Team	Stadium	Capacity	Location	
Alcobendas	Las Terrazas	2,000	Alcobendas, Madrid	2020–21 División de Honor teams
Aparejadores	San Amaro	1,000	Burgos, Castile and León	2020–21 División de Honor teams
Barcelona	La Teixonera	500	Barcelona, Catalonia	2020–21 División de Honor teams
Ciencias	Instalaciones Deportivas La Cartuja	3,000	Seville, Andalusia	2020–21 División de Honor teams
Complutense Cisneros	Estadio Complutense	12,400	Madrid, Madrid	2020–21 División de Honor teams
El Salvador	Pepe Rojo	5,000	Valladolid, Castile and León	2020–21 División de Honor teams
Getxo Artea RT	Fadura	1,000	Guecho	2020–21 División de Honor teams
Independiente	San Román	1,500	Santander, Cantabria	2020–21 División de Honor teams
Les Abelles	Polideportivo de Quatre Carreres	500	Valencia, Valencia	2020–21 División de Honor teams
Ordizia	Altamira	2,000	Ordizia, Basque Country	2020–21 División de Honor teams
Santboiana	Baldiri Aleu	3,500	Sant Boi de Llobregat, Catalonia	2020–21 División de Honor teams
Valladolid	Pepe Rojo	5,000	Valladolid, Castile and León	2020–21 División de Honor teams

== Results ==
	ALC	APA	BAR	CIE	CIS	ELS	GET	IND	LES	ORD	SAN	VAL
Alcobendas			26-15	47-3	27-18	26-5	39-6		56-6			
Aparejadores	31-29		18-29		31-20				21-0	27-24	39-22	
Barcelona					33-14	28-29		47-14	51-21		18-12	
Ciencias		19-36	11-28				31-31			3-28		6-35
Cisneros				18-12		8-27	51-18	36-15			35-16	
El Salvador		32-0		24-6			48-19			37-23		13-20
Getxo		5-51	15-26						14-14	29-46		14-38
Independiente	10-31	3-55		21-28		22-26	25-32					14-40
Les Abelles				17-6	24-22	22-42		18-39			24-31	
Ordizia	16-10		39-5		28-16			49-14	36-12		41-25	
Santboiana	14-31			61-32		22-21	53-19	50-19				25-29
Valladolid	19-20	16-6	23-16		33-14				41-17	32-19		

== Standings ==
=== First stage ===
	Team	P	W	D	L	F	A	+/-	TF	TA	+/-	Bon	Los	Pts
1	Valladolid	11	10	0	1	326	164	162	42	17	25	6	1	47
2	Alcobendas	11	9	0	2	342	143	199	42	14	28	4	2	42
3	El Salvador	11	8	0	3	304	196	108	43	24	19	5	2	39
4	Ordizia	11	8	0	3	349	210	139	38	23	15	4	1	37
5	Aparejadores	11	8	0	3	315	199	116	42	24	18	5	0	37
6	FC Barcelona	11	7	0	4	296	222	74	40	24	16	4	2	34
7	Santboiana	11	5	0	6	331	308	23	45	41	4	3	2	25
8	Complutense Cisneros	11	4	0	7	252	264	-12	31	35	-4	2	1	19
9	Les Abelles	11	2	1	8	175	359	-184	23	52	-29	0	1	11
10	Independiente	11	1	0	10	196	412	-216	25	57	-32	1	3	8
11	Getxo	11	1	2	8	202	422	-220	25	61	-36	0	0	8
12	Ciencias	11	1	1	9	157	346	-189	20	44	-24	0	1	7

Qualified for Group 1
Qualified for Group 2

=== Second stage ===
==== Group 1 ====
	Team	P	W	D	L	F	A	+/-	TF	TA	+/-	Bon	Los	Pts
1	Alcobendas	10	8	0	2	246	164	82	25	16	9	1	2	35
2	Valladolid	10	7	0	3	222	194	28	23	17	6	1	2	31
3	El Salvador	10	5	0	5	226	219	7	26	25	1	1	1	22
4	Ordizia	10	4	0	6	219	244	-25	25	29	-4	1	3	20
5	FC Barcelona	10	3	0	7	261	287	-26	31	32	-1	1	4	17
6	Aparejadores	10	3	0	7	207	273	-66	21	32	-11	0	2	14

==== Group 2 ====
	Team	P	W	D	L	F	A	+/-	TF	TA	+/-	Bon	Los	Pts
1	Complutense Cisneros	10	9	0	1	335	196	139	41	24	17	3	1	40
2	Ciencias	10	5	1	4	237	233	4	30	27	3	1	2	25
3	Santboiana	10	5	0	5	306	281	25	41	35	6	3	2	25
4	Les Abelles	10	4	1	5	210	250	-40	25	32	-7	1	3	22
5	Independiente	10	3	0	7	221	265	-44	25	33	-8	1	5	18
6	Getxo Artea RT	10	2	2	6	228	312	-84	28	39	-11	0	2	14

Qualified for playoff quarterfinals
Playoff against 2nd place team from División de Honor B
Relegation to División de Honor B

== Playoffs ==
Quarter finals
1	(Community of Madrid) Alcobendas	21
8	(Andalusia) Ciencias	0
4	(Basque Country (autonomous community)) Ordizia	9
5	(Catalonia) Barcelona	16
2	(Castile and León) Valladolid	14
7	(Community of Madrid) Cisneros	12
3	(Castile and León) El Salvador	34
6	(Castile and León) Burgos	26

Semifinals
(Community of Madrid) Alcobendas	43
(Catalonia) Barcelona	14
(Castile and León) Valladolid	16
(Castile and León) El Salvador	13

Final
(Community of Madrid) Alcobendas	15
(Castile and León) Valladolid	19

== Relegation playoff ==
The relegation playoff was played by Independiente, the team finishing 11th in División de Honor, and Gernika, who lost the División de Honor B promotion playoff final 26-22 to La Vila.

Gernika won 34–21 and gained promotion to the División de Honor for the 2021–22 season.
