= 2021–22 División de Honor de Rugby =

Spanish rugby union season

2021–22 División de Honor
- Countries: Spain
- Date: 3 October 2021
- Champions: Santboiana
- Runners-up: Ordizia
- Relegated: Gernika, Alcobendas

The 2021–22 División de Honor was the 55th season of the División de Honor, the top flight of Spanish domestic rugby union.

Santboiana won its eight title, defeating Ordizia in the final.

== Competition format ==
The season took place between October and May.

The league format was altered for the 2021-22 season. The twelve teams were split into two groups of 6, based on their placings in last season's league.

Group A	Group B
Alcobendas	Burgos
Barcelona	Ciencias
Cisneros	Gernika
El Salvador	Les Abelles
La Vila	Ordizia
Santboiana	Valladolid

Teams played the other teams in their group twice, and then played a further six games against teams from the other group, making a total of 16 games.

The teams were all classified in the same table, with the top eight sides qualifying for the playoffs to decide the champion.

Points were awarded as follows:

- 4 points for a win
- 2 points for a draw
- 1 bonus point for a team scoring 4 tries or more in a match
- 1 bonus point for a team that loses a match by 7 points or fewer

=== Promotion and relegation ===
The second-tier División de Honor B is made up of three regional groups. The top eight teams across the three groups play off; the champion is promoted to División de Honor, at the expense of the team which finishes last in the División de Honor.

The runner-up plays a further play-off against the team which finishes 11th in the top flight.

== Teams ==
Relegated sides Independiente and Getxo were replaced by La Vila and Gernika.

Team	Stadium	Capacity	Location	
Alcobendas	Las Terrazas	2,000	Alcobendas, Madrid	2021–22 División de Honor teams
Aparejadores	San Amaro	1,000	Burgos, Castile and León	2021–22 División de Honor teams
Barcelona	La Teixonera	500	Barcelona, Catalonia	2021–22 División de Honor teams
Ciencias	Instalaciones Deportivas La Cartuja	3,000	Seville, Andalusia	2021–22 División de Honor teams
Complutense Cisneros	Estadio Complutense	12,400	Madrid, Madrid	2021–22 División de Honor teams
El Salvador	Pepe Rojo	5,000	Valladolid, Castile and León	2021–22 División de Honor teams
Gernika RT	Urbieta zelaia	3,000	Gernika	2021–22 División de Honor teams
La Vila	Campo de Rugby “El Pantano”	1,550	Villajoyosa, Valencia	2021–22 División de Honor teams
Les Abelles	Polideportivo de Quatre Carreres	500	Valencia, Valencia	2021–22 División de Honor teams
Ordizia	Altamira	2,000	Ordizia, Basque Country	2021–22 División de Honor teams
Santboiana	Baldiri Aleu	3,500	Sant Boi de Llobregat, Catalonia	2021–22 División de Honor teams
Valladolid	Pepe Rojo	5,000	Valladolid, Castile and León	2021–22 División de Honor teams

== Results ==
	ALC	APA	FCB	CIE	CIS	ELS	GER	LaV	LES	ORD	SAN	VAL
Alcobendas			17-22	31-16	26-29	21-23		46-10	29-23	35-30	39-13	
Aparejadores	9-16		42-30	20-20		21-17	34-13		68-31	22-22		30-28
Barcelona	13-25			33-34	12-28	30-33		26-19	41-21	24-9	20-23	
Ciencias		29-14			42-11		45-15	30-20	43-5	34-28	41-40	28-3
Cisneros	13-36	33-20	25-15			24-20	31-35	22-15			31-25	26-28
El Salvador	23-22		36-13	29-19	25-14			33-10	24-7	47-26	12-17	
Gernika RT	10-12	17-33	22-26	14-20		29-23			26-29	15-16		8-17
La Vila	0-22	24-20	31-43		15-29	34-42	20-7				20-33	20-16
Les Abelles		27-6		29-19	24-21		24-26	17-24		29-23	24-44	27-38
Ordizia		22-3		19-12	31-18		51-8	27-13	34-12		34-32	19-11
Santboiana	19-16	34-28	18-15		38-26	26-21	48-15	16-6				37-3
Valladolid	36-29	26-26	25-32	13-12		14-43	18-10		37-12	13-25		

== Standings ==
The final standings were affected by Alcobendas' use of Gavin van den Berg, a South African-born player whose passport was found to have falsified stamps on it. It emerged that van den Berg had played for Spain's national team despite not meeting the minimum residency requirements necessary to be eligible. Spain were duly disqualified from the rugby World Cup and Alcobendas were relegated for their part in the scandal.

	Team	P	W	D	L	F	A	+/-	TF	TA	+/-	Bon	Los	Pts
1	(Castile and León) El Salvador	16	11	0	5	451	327	124	62	44	18	5	5	54
2	(Catalonia) Santboiana	16	12	0	4	463	351	112	58	40	18	2	3	53
3	(Community of Madrid) Alcobendas	16	10	0	6	422	289	133	49	28	21	4	6	50
4	(Basque Country (autonomous community)) Ordizia	16	10	1	5	416	328	88	44	37	7	4	3	49
5	(Andalusia) Ciencias	16	10	1	5	444	324	120	54	44	10	4	2	48
6	(Community of Madrid) Complutense Cisneros	16	8	0	8	381	407	-26	39	56	-17	0	3	35
7	(Catalonia) FC Barcelona	16	7	0	9	395	408	-13	53	44	9	3	4	35
8	(Castile and León) Aparejadores	16	6	3	7	396	389	7	43	46	-3	2	3	35
9	(Castile and León) Valladolid	16	7	1	8	326	384	-58	37	40	-3	1	3	34
10	(Valencian Community) Les Abelles	16	5	0	11	341	503	-162	46	69	-23	1	3	24
11	(Valencian Community) CR La Vila	16	4	0	12	281	429	-148	38	54	-16	0	2	18
12	(Basque Country (autonomous community)) Gernika RT	16	3	0	13	270	447	-177	36	57	-21	1	5	18
Source: Federación Española de Rugby: Clasificación de la División de Honor

Qualified for playoff quarterfinals
Relegation to División de Honor B

== Playoffs ==
The playoffs were played on the 15 May 2022, with the exception of Alcobendas vs. Cisneros, which was postponed due to ongoing investigations in the Van den Berg affair. The Spanish rugby federation finally disqualified Alcobendas on the 26 May 2022, meaning Cisneros earned a bye to the semifinals.

Quarter finals
1	(Castile and León) El Salvador	20
8	(Castile and León) Aparejadores	14
4	(Basque Country (autonomous community)) Ordizia	26
5	(Andalusia) Ciencias	20
2	(Catalonia) Santboiana	30
7	(Catalonia) Barcelona	23
3	(Community of Madrid) Alcobendas
6	(Community of Madrid) Cisneros

Semifinals
(Castile and León) El Salvador	27
(Basque Country (autonomous community)) Ordizia	30
(Catalonia) Santboiana	32
(Community of Madrid) Cisneros	26

Final
(Basque Country (autonomous community)) Ordizia	17
(Catalonia) Santboiana	23

== Copa del Rey ==
The twelve teams were divided into four groups of three. The winner of each group proceeded to the semifinals of the cup, which were one-legged ties.

The draw for the cup groups was restricted to ensure that teams are in the same group as well. This enabled specified league games to also count as cup group games.

Group 1: Barcelona, El Salvador, La Vila

Group 2: Ordizia, Les Abelles, Valladolid

Group 3: Santboiana, Lexus Alcobendas, Complutense Cisneros

Group 4: Gernika, Ciencias, Aparejadores

Although Alcobendas won a place in the final, they were eliminated from the competition as a result of the Van der Berg affair and were replaced in the final by Ciencias. Due to the prolonged investigation into Alcobendas, it was not possible to schedule the final before the off-season began, and the final was delayed until September 25 2022.

Semifinals
1	(Basque Country (autonomous community)) Ordizia	16
2	(Castile and León) El Salvador	23
3	(Community of Madrid) Alcobendas	23
4	(Andalusia) Ciencias	18

Final
(Castile and León) El Salvador	27
(Andalusia) Ciencias	26
