= Jordi Camps =

Spanish rugby union player

- Born: 5 May 1973 (age 53) Barcelona, Spain
- Height: 5 ft 11 in (1.80 m)
- Weight: 205 lb (93 kg)

Rugby union career
- Position: Prop
Amateur team(s)
Years	Team	Apps	(Points)
-1994	Club Natació Montjuïc		
Senior career
Years	Team	Apps	(Points)
1994-1995	Currie RFC		
1995-2000	U.E. Santboiana		
International career
Years	Team	Apps	(Points)
1993-1999	Spain	14	(0)

Jordi Camps Riba (born Barcelona, 5 May 1973) is a Spanish rugby union player. He plays as a prop and as flanker.

== Career ==
At club level, he played for U.E. Santboiana and for the Scottish club Currie RFC. His first international cap was against Italy, at Madrid, on 14 February 1993. Along with his fellow U.E. Santboiana players such as Steve Tuineau, Oriol Ripol, Víctor Torres and Alberto Malo, He was also part of the 1999 Rugby World Cup roster, playing two matches in the tournament. During a senior tournament in Bermuda, he and Alberto Malo - who then were playing for Iberia Classic team - were invited by Buck Shelford to play for the Classic All Blacks in the match for the Silver Cup against Argentina, due to shortage of players in the New Zealand team. The match was eventually won by the New Zealand team.
