= Tuineau =

Tuineau is a name. Notable people with the name include:

- Tuineau Alipate (1967–2021), Tongan gridiron football player
- Joe Tuineau (born 1981), Tonga rugby union footballer
- Steve Tuineau Iloa (born 1969), Tongan-born Spanish rugby union player
