= Juan Pablo Socino =

Argentine rugby union player (born 1988)

- Born: Juan Pablo Socino; 30 May 1988 (age 38) Buenos Aires, Argentina
- Height: 1.78 m (5 ft 10 in)
- Weight: 98 kg (15 st 6 lb)

Rugby union career
- Position: Centre
Senior career
Years	Team	Apps	(Points)
2009	(Spain) UE Santboiana		
2009–2010	(Wales) Tonmawr RFC		
2010–2011	(England) Rotherham Titans	27	(264)
2011–2012	(England) Nottingham	28	(50)
2012–2013	(France) Dax	20	(11)
2013–2014	(England) Rotherham Titans	25	(310)
2014–2018	(England) Newcastle Falcons	92	(169)
2018–2019	(Scotland) Edinburgh	16	(2)
2019	(Spain) CR El Salvador	5	(33)
2020–2021	(England) Saracens	11	(0)
2021–2022	(England) Leicester Tigers	9	(9)
2022-2025	(Spain) UE Santboiana	20	(184)
2009–	Total	253	(1,032)
- Correct as of 6 January 2024
International career
Years	Team	Apps	(Points)
2007	Argentina U19	5	(5)
2008	Argentina U20	3	(0)
2012–2014	Argentina Jaguars	4	(10)
2015	Argentina	4	(8)
- Correct as of 30 October 2015

Juan Pablo Socino (born 30 May 1988) is an international Argentine rugby union player who plays as a centre, he currently plays for UE Santboiana in Spain. He won four caps for Argentina in 2015, including being named in the squad for the 2015 Rugby World Cup.

He has previously played for Rotherham Titans, Nottingham and Saracens in the RFU Championship, for Newcastle Falcons in Premiership Rugby, for US Dax in France's Pro D2 and for CR El Salvador in Spain's División de Honor de Rugby and for Edinburgh in the Pro14.
