= FC Barcelona Rugby =

Rugby section of the FC Barcelona sports club

(Spain) Barcelona
- Full name: Futbol Club Barcelona Rugby
- Founded: 21 September 1924; 101 years ago
- Location: Barcelona, Catalonia, Spain
- Ground: La Teixonera (Capacity: 500)
- Chairman: Joan Laporta
- Coach: Juan Pablo Socino
- League: División de Honor
- 2025-26: 11th (Relegated)
1st kit	2nd kit	3rd kit

Official website
- www.fcbrugby.com

Futbol Club Barcelona Rugby is a Catalan Spanish rugby union club. The senior team currently plays in División de Honor Élite, the second level of Spanish rugby union. Formed in 1924, the club is a member of the FC Barcelona family. The club currently plays its home games in La Teixonera.

Before the Spanish Civil War, the club won the Spain Championship on three occasions and the Catalonia Championship seven times. During the 1940s and 1950s Barcelona was one of the strongest rugby clubs in Spain, winning a further 10 Spanish championships. In 1953 and 1954 they won the first Spanish league titles.

== History ==
=== Formation ===
On September 21, 1924 Barça played its first match, a friendly against CADCI in Sant Boi de Llobregat. This inaugural match was attended by the then president and founder of the club, Joan Gamper, who was accompanied by numerous executives. Barcelona won the match 9-5.

Francisco Baltasar Albèniz was made delegate of the rugby club by Gamper, who was an admirer of the rugby and who saw Baltasar as a true FC Barcelona man, and a pioneer of this sport in Spain. For the club's silver anniversary, two international matches were staged: the first against Stade Toulousain, reigning champions in France that year, and the second an exhibition against players from both Stade Toulousain and MSP Perpignan. Both matches were played in Les Corts, and despite the lack of grass pitches, the French players gave a great demonstration of their skills.

=== Early years ===
In the 1925–26 season, Barcelona rose in the ranks of Spanish rugby and, under Corominas their coach, put together a formidable XV: Blasco, Aximeno, Folch, Fuste, Carreras, Aguilar, Bori, Estapé, Fontanella, Pujalte, Rufus, Isar, Ruiz, Rues, Rossini, Baides and Miquel. They won the club's first championships in Catalonia and Spain, and went on to win Catalan championship five seasons in a row.

1925 also saw two matches with international opponents: the first a 9-8 victory against Witte Devils of Perpignan, then champions of the Rousillón seconds, the club's first success against a French side. The second was against Stade Toulousain, who again had won the French championship and who comfortably beat Barcelona.

=== Continued success ===
The 1926-27 season was extremely successful, with the both Barcelona's first and second team winning the Catalonia Championships. The Spanish Championship wasn't held that year. A British soldiers' team visited the club, and was defeated 20-0.

Two more Catalonia Championships were won in 1927-28 and 1928-29. 1928 also saw Barcelona's first trip abroad, as they travelled to play Lyon.

During the 1929-30 season, the quality of the Catalonia Championship was said to increase notably, but Barcelona won once again, and also won the Spanish Championship, defeating Real Madrid 39-3.

More success followed in 1931-32, as both Barcelona's teams won the Catalonia Championship, and also the Catalonia Cup, which was held for the first time. Barcelona won the Spanish Championship for a third time, beating Madrid away 20-3. That year they played a friendly in Valencia, their first ever match against the F.U.E., held in a packed and enthusiastic Estadio de Vallejo. Barcelona won 25-5.

The club experienced problems in 1933-34, when the strain of not being able to train properly and not having a home ground for two years took its toll. The Catalonia Championship was won by UE Santboiana.

1934-35 was more positive, as the club's management rented a pitch in Avenida Diagonal, meaning regular training was possible, and a higher level of playing standards was achieved. The second XV won the Catalonia Championship, while the first XV won the second-ever Catalonia Cup.

=== Reorganisation ===
After the Civil War, F.C. Barcelona underwent reorganisation, and it was not until 1940 that friendly matches were played, in various stadia in Montjuïc, Diagonal and Sant Boi. The club board, presided over by the Marques of the Mesa de Asta, Enrique Piñeyro, gave the rugby club great support, leading to the creation of the Catalan Federation of Rugby at the start of 1941. An exhibition match against R.C.D Espanyol was played to a full house in Manresa, and Barcelona won 3-0.

1941-42 was a golden season, heralding the club's eighth Catalonia Championship and its fourth Spain Championship. Barcelona defeated Real Madrid 28-0 in the final, before beating SEU Madrid 17-8 in the final. Barcelona's captain Sardá received the cup from General José Moscardó Ituarte, head of the National Sports Delegation at the time. Barcelona's president Piñeyro travelled with the side to Madrid to offer the team moral support.

In 1945-46, the first and second teams once again won the Catalonia Championship. The first team won the Spain Championship, now known as the Generalísimo Cup, defeating Frente de Juventudes de Madrid 9-3 in the semi-final, and, in Les Corts, winning the final 23-13 against SEU Madrid.

Over the next two decades, Barcelona enjoyed regular success, and by 1969 had won 19 Catalonia Championship and 14 Spain Championships, along with the Pyrenees Cup and the Iberian Cup. They won the first two División de Honor titles in 1953 and 1954, but did not participate in the tournament for fifteen seasons thereafter. In 1966, they won the Generalísimo Cupm the successor to the Spain Championship, when they beat neighbours Universitario 3-0 in the final, led by the international player Rocabert, and club legend Ramón Rabassa as their coach.

By 1972-73, the club was directed by Dalmacio Moner with Francisco Gallardo as his assistant, someone who had been connected with the club his whole life. These two men, along with Francisco Baltasar, were the men who would lead the club through both triumphs and troubles.

One of the major problems the club has had to face regularly is a lack of a permanent playing ground. Enrique Llaudet, club president in 1966, announced a new ground was in the pipeline, but the construction of the Palau de Gel and the Palau Blaugrana obligated the rugby team to move. Once the team was able to move back to its home ground, the finished at the top end of the table in 1972-73.

=== Recent years ===
Since the mid-1970s, Barcelona have been promoted and relegated several times, moving between the top three tiers of rugby in Spain. In 1985, they won the Copa del Rey de Rugby, the latest successor of the Spain Championship, but spent much of the 1990s and early 2000s languishing in the lower tiers.

They were promoted to the top tier in 2006, after signing an agreement to replace the downsizing USAP Barcelona, but were relegated in the 2007-08 season. According to the terms of their agreement with USAP Barcelona, this meant they were actually demoted to the third tier, the same division in which their second team were playing. This in turn meant the seconds were relegated to regional levels, and their third team was disbanded. However, both the first and second team were promoted in 2009-10, and the first team, after playing in the second tier División de Honor B for five seasons, were promoted to the top tier División de Honor in 2014.

In 2018, Barcelona won the first-ever Catalan Supercup, beating Santboiana 21-17. In 2019, they reached the final of the Copa del Rey de Rugby, losing 23-24 in agonising fashion to Alcobendas, who scored a converted try in the 90th minute of play. In the same season, they finished 6th in the División de Honor, qualifying for the playoffs for the first time.

== Past performances ==
Season	Tier	Division	Pos.	Notes
1952–53	1	División de Honor	1st	League champion
1953–54	1	División de Honor	1st	League champion
1954–69		DNP		
1969–70	1	División de Honor	2nd	
1970–71	1	División de Honor	3rd	
1971–72	1	División de Honor	8th	
1972–73	1	División de Honor	6th	
1973–74	1	División de Honor	9th	
1974–75	1	División de Honor	10th	↓
1975–76	2	Primera Nacional	2nd	
1976–77	2	Primera Nacional	4th	
1977–78	2	Primera Nacional	2nd	↑
1978–79	1	División de Honor	4th	
1979–80	1	División de Honor	4th	
1980–81	1	División de Honor	4th	
1981–82	1	División de Honor	3rd	↓
1982–83	2	Primera Nacional	1st	↑
1983–84	1	División de Honor	5th	
1984–85	1	División de Honor	4th	
1985–86	1	División de Honor	7th	↓
1986–95		DNP		
1995–96	2	Primera Nacional	7th	
1996–97	2	Primera Nacional	8th	
1997–98	2	Primera Nacional	5th	
1998–99	3	Primera Nacional	3rd	
1999–00	3	Primera Nacional	4th	
2000–01	3	Primera Nacional	4th	
2001–02	3	Primera Nacional	7th	

Season	Tier	Division	Pos.	Notes
2002–03	3	Primera Nacional	5th	
2003–04	3	Primera Nacional	4th	
2004–05	3	Primera Nacional	4th	
2005–06	3	Primera Nacional	3rd	↑
2006–07	1	División de Honor	6th	
2007–08	1	División de Honor	10th	↓
2008–09	3	Primera Nacional	2nd	↑
2009–10	2	División de Honor B	2nd	
2010–11	2	División de Honor B	3rd	
2011–12	2	División de Honor B	6th	
2012–13	2	División de Honor B	4th	
2013–14	2	División de Honor B	1st / 1st	↑
2014–15	1	División de Honor	11th	
2015–16	1	División de Honor	7th	
2016–17	1	División de Honor	10th	
2017–18	1	División de Honor	7th	
2018–19	1	División de Honor	6th	
2019–20	1	División de Honor	6th	
2020–21	1	División de Honor	5th	
2021–22	1	División de Honor	7th	
2022–23	1	División de Honor	6th	
2023–24	1	División de Honor	11th	
2024–25	1	División de Honor	8th	
2025–26	1	División de Honor	11th	↓
2026–27	2	División de Honor Élite	-	

- 29 seasons in División de Honor

== Club honours ==
- División de Honor: 2
  - 1952–53, 1953–54
- División de Honor B de Rugby: 1
  - 2013-14
- Primera Nacional: 1
  - 1982-83
- Spain Championships/Copa del Rey: 16
  - 1926, 1930, 1932, 1942, 1944, 1945, 1946, 1950, 1951, 1952, 1953, 1955, 1956, 1965, 1983, 1985
- Supercopa de España: 1
  - 1983
- Copa Ibérica: 1
  - 1970
- Pyrenees cup: 1
  - 1966-67
- Campionats de Catalunya: 22
  - 1926, 1927, 1928, 1929, 1930, 1932, 1936, 1942, 1946, 1947, 1948, 1949, 1950, 1951, 1952, 1953, 1955, 1968, 1969, 1995, 2016, 2019
- Copes Catalanes: 4
  - 1982, 2003, 2008, 2017
- Levante Club Leagues: 2
  - 1982, 1983
- Catalan supercup de rugby: 2
  - 2018, 2022

=== Youth team ===
- Campionat d'Espanya juvenil de rugbs: 1
  - 2003
- Campionat de Catalunya de 2ª: 1
  - 1967
- Campionats de Catalunya juvenil 2: 2
  - 2000, 2006
- Copes Catalanes juvenil: 4
  - 2000, 2002, 2003, 2004

== Notable players ==
- (Wales) Huw Maldwyn Williams - Ex Bath academy player
- (United States) Teddy Barron - USA U20 international
- Sergio Guerrero - 6 caps for Spain
- Víctor Marlet - 8 caps for Spain
- (Ukraine) Andrei Kovalenco - 37 caps for Spain (including the 1999 Rugby World Cup)
- (Spain) Joan Losada - Player of the Spanish national rugby sevens team at the 2016 Summer Olympics
- (Spain) Pol Pla - Player of the Spanish national rugby sevens team at the 2016 Summer Olympics

== See also ==
- Rugby union in Spain
