= Ordizia RE =

Spanish rugby union club, based in Ordizia

(Spain) AMPO Ordizia
- Full name: Ordizia Rugby Elkartea
- Founded: 1973; 53 years ago
- Location: Ordizia, Spain
- Ground: Estadio Municipal de Altamira (Capacity: 2,000)
- Chairman: Koro Bosque
- Coach: Federico Gallo
- League: División de Honor
- 2023–24: División de Honor, 9th

Official website
- www.ordiziarugby.com

Ordizia Rugby Elkartea is a Spanish rugby union club. The club was established in 1973 and currently competes in the División de Honor de Rugby competition, the highest level of Spanish club rugby. The club is based in the town of Ordizia in the Basque region of Northern Spain. Ordizia play in red and blue colours.

== Honours ==
- División de Honor B: 1
  - Champions: 2004–05
- Copa del Rey: 2
  - Champions: 2011–12, 2012–13
- Supercopa de España: 0
  - Runners-up: 2012, 2013

=== International honours ===
- (Spain) Francisco Puertas Soto
- (Spain) Pedro Martín
- (Spain) Matías Tudela
- (Spain) Julen Goia
- (Spain) Tom Parker

== Season by season ==
Season	Tier	Division	Pos.	Notes
1978–79	2	Primera Nacional	3rd	↑
1979–80	1	División de Honor	6th	↓
1980–81	2	Primera Nacional	2nd	↑
1981–82	1	División de Honor	7th	↓
1982–83	2	Primera Nacional	3rd	
1983–84	2	Primera Nacional	7th	↓
1984–86	3	Segunda Nacional		
1986–87	2	Primera Nacional	3rd	
1987–88	2	Primera Nacional	4th	
1988–89	2	Primera Nacional	5th	
1989–90	2	Primera Nacional	3rd	
1990–91	2	Primera Nacional	5th	
1991–92	2	Primera Nacional	5th	
1992–93	2	Primera Nacional	6th	
1993–94	2	Primera Nacional	6th	
1994–95	2	Primera Nacional	2nd	
1995–96	2	Primera Nacional	4th	
1996–97	2	Primera Nacional	6th	
1997–98	2	Primera Nacional	1st	
1998–99	2	División de Honor B	8th	
2003–04	2	División de Honor B	3rd	
2004–05	2	División de Honor B	1st	↑
2005–06	1	División de Honor	7th	
2006–07	1	División de Honor	7th	
2007–08	1	División de Honor	6th	
2008–09	1	División de Honor	7th	
2009–10	1	División de Honor	7th	
2010–11	1	División de Honor	2nd	

Season	Tier	Division	Pos.	Notes
2011–12	1	División de Honor	2nd / F	Cup champion
2012–13	1	División de Honor	5th / QF	Cup champion
2013–14	1	División de Honor	6th / QF	
2014–15	1	División de Honor	7th	
2015–16	1	División de Honor	9th	
2016–17	1	División de Honor	7th	
2017–18	1	División de Honor	5th / QF	
2018–19	1	División de Honor	4th / SF	
2019–20	1	División de Honor	4th	
2020–21	1	División de Honor	4th / QF	
2021–22	1	División de Honor	4th / F	
2022–23	1	División de Honor	8th	
2023–24	1	División de Honor	9th	
2024–25	1	División de Honor	-	

- 22 seasons in División de Honor

== See also ==
- Rugby union in Spain
