= CR El Salvador =

Spanish rugby union club, based in Valladolid

El Salvador
- Full name: Club de Rugby El Salvador
- Nickname: Chamizos
- Founded: 1960; 66 years ago
- Location: Valladolid, Spain
- Ground: Estadio Pepe Rojo (Capacity: 5,000)
- Chairman: Santiago Toca
- Coach: Álvaro Gorostiza
- League: División de Honor
- 2024–25: Champions
1st kit	2nd kit

Official website
- www.rugbyelsalvador.com

Club de Rugby El Salvador is a Spanish rugby union club. The club was established in 1960 and currently competes in the men's División de Honor de Rugby and in the women's División de Honor Femenina de Rugby competitions, the highest levels of Spanish club rugby. The club is based in Valladolid in central Spain, playing their matches at the Estadio Pepe Rojo. The club's colours are black and white.

El Salvador is one of the most successful Spanish rugby union clubs, having won División de Honor in seven times, Copa del Rey in six times and Supercopa de España in five times.

The women team competes on the Liga Iberdrola.

== Recent history ==
El Salvador were relegated to the second-tier Primera Division, in 1995/96 season, spending one season in the second-tier Primera División, but immediately returned to the División de Honor after topping the table in the 1996/97 season. That success was followed by the side's winning the División de Honor in the 1997/98, becoming the first newly-promoted team to win the title. The following season led to two more titles: the Ibero Cup and another Copa del Rey, adding to the club's distinguished history.

Two more titles followed in the 1999/2000 and 2001/02 seasons. In 2004/05 and 2005/06 the club finished as runners up in the league, but won the Copa del Rey twice, along with a new Ibero Cup and two Spanish Super Cups.

In the 2003/04 season, CR El Salvador participated in a European competition for the first time, debuting against Harlequins in London, before going out in the second round - a first for a Spanish club - to the Italian team Rovigo.

In the 2006/07 season, they won all three titles at senior level: División de Honor, the Copa del Rey and the Super Cup title.

In the 2007/08 season, it was yet another excellent year for the team, as they won the Division de Honor and the Super Cup title.

In the Amlin Challenge cup in 2010/2011, they won Petrarca Padova rugby in Pepe Rojo stadium (37-16)

== Honors ==
- Spanish League: 9
  - 1990–91, 1997–98, 2002–03, 2003–04, 2006–07, 2007–08, 2009–10, 2015–16, 2024–25
- Copa del Rey: 8
  - 1993, 1999, 2005, 2006, 2007, 2011, 2016, 2022
- Supercopa: 6
  - 2003, 2004, 2005, 2006, 2007, 2018
- Copa Ibérica: 5
  - 1992, 1999, 2004, 2005, 2016

== Season by season ==
Season	Tier	Division	Pos.	Notes
1970–71	1	División de Honor	2nd	
1971–72	1	División de Honor	2nd	
1972–73	1	División de Honor	3rd	
1973–78		DNP		
1978–79	2	Primera Nacional	3rd	
1979–80	2	Primera Nacional	2nd	
1980–81	2	Primera Nacional	3rd	
1981–82	2	Primera Nacional	2nd	
1982–83	2	Primera Nacional	3rd	
1983–84	2	Primera Nacional	6th	
1984–85	2	Primera Nacional	1st	
1985–86	2	Primera Nacional	2nd	↑
1986–87	1	División de Honor	8th	
1987–88	1	División de Honor	3rd	
1988–89	1	División de Honor	5th	
1989–90	1	División de Honor	2nd	
1990–91	1	División de Honor	1st	League champion
1991–92	1	División de Honor	6th	
1992–93	1	División de Honor	7th	Cup champion
1993–94	1	División de Honor	3rd	
1994–95	1	División de Honor	6th	
1995–96	1	División de Honor	9th	↓
1996–97	2	Primera Nacional	1st	↑
1997–98	1	División de Honor	1st	League champion
1998–99	1	División de Honor	5th	Cup champion

Season	Tier	Division	Pos.	Notes
1999–00	1	División de Honor	2nd	
2000–01	1	División de Honor	7th	
2001–02	1	División de Honor	2nd	
2002–03	1	División de Honor	1st	League champion
2003–04	1	División de Honor	1st	League champion
2004–05	1	División de Honor	2nd	Cup champion
2005–06	1	División de Honor	2nd	Cup champion
2006–07	1	División de Honor	1st	League/Cup champion
2007–08	1	División de Honor	1st	League champion
2008–09	1	División de Honor	2nd	
2009–10	1	División de Honor	1st	League champion
2010–11	1	División de Honor	3rd	Cup champion
2011–12	1	División de Honor	7th	
2012–13	1	División de Honor	4th / SF	
2013–14	1	División de Honor	2nd / F	
2014–15	1	División de Honor	5th / SF	
2015–16	1	División de Honor	2nd / W	League/Cup champion
2016-17	1	División de Honor	1st / F	
2017-18	1	División de Honor	2nd / F	
2018-19	1	División de Honor	1st / F	
2019-20	1	División de Honor	2nd	
2020-21	1	División de Honor	3rd / SF	
2021-22	1	División de Honor	1st / SF	Cup champion
2022-23	1	División de Honor	6th / QF	
2023-24	1	División de Honor	4th / SF	
2024-25	1	División de Honor	-	

- 39 seasons in División de Honor (Last season told 2024-25)

== International honours ==
- (Portugal) Juan Murré
- (Samoa) Uale Mai
- (Samoa) Esera Lauina
- (Samoa) Joe Mamea
- (Spain) Manuel Serrano
- (Spain) Jaime Nava
- (Spain) Julio Álvarez
- (Spain) Pablo Feijoo
- (Spain) Carlos Souto
- (Spain) Sergio Souto
- (Spain) Iván Criado
- (Spain) Javier Miranda
- (Spain) Salé Ibarra
- (Spain) "Toche"
- (Spain) César Sempere
- (Tonga) James Faiva
- (Spain) Matthew Bede Smith

== Other notable players ==
- Sam Katz (England Students International)
- Gillies Kaka (capped by New Zealand 7s)
- Jacob Kennedy (signs from Hawke's Bay, capped by New Zealand Under 19)
- Andy Long (England international)
- Charlie O'Connell (signs from Canterbury, capped by New Zealand Under 19)
- Joe McDonnell (New Zealand international)
- David Palu (Tonga international)
- (South Africa) Regardt Van Eyk (former player from Mighty Elephants in the Currie Cup)
- Justin Wilson (former player from Auckland Blues, Hurricanes and Chiefs in Super12/14. Capped by New Zealand Māoris and New Zealand 7s)

●Hansie Graff (signed from SWD Eagles, also played for Bayonne and the Sharks.)

== Notable Signings ==
- Sam Katz - England Students national rugby union team whose previous club was Loughborough Students RUFC. Highest scorer of 328 points in the División de Honor for 2014/15 season and 388 points for 2015/16 season.
- Uale Mai – Manu Samoa and Samoa Sevens international, 2006 IRB International Sevens Player of the Year, signed for 2010–11.
- Joe McDonnell - New Zealand international signed from Newcastle Falcons as player coach for 2009/10 season.
- Andy Long - England national rugby union team international signed from Newcastle Falcons as player for 2009/10 season. He signed for Northampton Saints in half of the season.

== See also ==
- Rugby union in Spain
- Spanish rugby union players
- Spanish rugby union competitions
