= Alcobendas Rugby =

Spanish rugby union club, based in Alcobendas

(Spain) Silicius Alcobendas Rugby
- Full name: Club Deportivo Básico Alcobendas Rugby
- Founded: 2003; 23 years ago
- Location: Alcobendas, Spain
- Ground: Campo de Rugby Las Terrazas
- Chairman: Iñigo Prados
- Coach: Javier Garrido
- League: División de Honor
- 2023–24: División de Honor, 5th
Team kit	2nd kit

Official website
- www.alcobendasrugby.com

Club Alcobendas Rugby is a Spanish rugby team based in Alcobendas, Spain.

== History ==
The club was established in 2003 by local fans from Alcobendas, and played its first ever season in División de Honor that year, occupying the place formally occupied by Moraleja. Other past teams from Alcobendas includes Teca Rugby Club (1972–1990), Club España Urogallos (1979–1990), Alcobendas Rugby Club (1990–1999), Club de Rugby La Moraleja–El Soto (1990–1999), Moraleja Alcobendas Rugby Unión (1999–2003), Club Alcobendas Rugby (2003– ).

== Trophies ==
- División de Honor: 1
  - Champions: 2001–02
- Copa del Rey: 4
  - Champions: 2018–19, 2019–20, 2021–22, 2025-26
- División de Honor B: 4
  - Champions: 2006–07, 2009–10, 2014–15, 2022-23

== Season by season ==
Season	Tier	Division	Pos.	Notes
2003–04	1	División de Honor	7th	
2004–05	1	División de Honor	8th	
2005–06	1	División de Honor	9th	↓
2006–07	2	División de Honor B	1st	↑
2007–08	1	División de Honor	9th	↓
2008–09	2	División de Honor B	2nd	
2009–10	2	División de Honor B	1st	↑
2010–11	1	División de Honor	8th	
2011–12	1	División de Honor	10th	↓
2012–13	2	División de Honor B	1st / F	
2013–14	2	División de Honor B	1st / 3rd	
2014–15	2	División de Honor B	1st / P	↑
2015–16	1	División de Honor	6th / QF	
2016–17	1	División de Honor	3rd / SF	
2017–18	1	División de Honor	3rd / SF	
2018–19	1	División de Honor	3rd / SF	Cup champion
2019–20	1	División de Honor	3rd	Cup champion
2020–21	1	División de Honor	2nd / F	Cup champion
2021–22	1	División de Honor	3rd / Disqualified	↓
2022–23	1	División de Honor B	1st	↑
2023–24	1	División de Honor	5th	
2024–25	1	División de Honor	3rd / SF	
2025–26	1	División de Honor	3rd / -	

- 21 seasons in División de Honor

== Notable players ==
- Oriol Ripol
- Martin Kafka
- Jaime Nava
- José Ignacio Inchausti
- Steve Tuineau

== Ground ==
=== Polideportivo José Caballero ===
In certain occasions, depending on the state of Las Terrazas' pitch or on the match, Alcobendas played at the rugby field of Polideportivo José Caballero in Alcobendas, in the section 17 of Nacional I. Said playing field was inaugurated by the Maori All Blacks in 1990 during a match against Spain. As of currently, the sports complex is used by the third grade team and the club's lower grade teams.
