= Tiago Girão =

Portuguese rugby union player

- Born: Tiago Menezes Girão; 30 November 1984 (age 41) Lisbon
- Height: 1.87 m (6 ft 2 in)
- Weight: 101 kg (223 lb)

Rugby union career
- Position: Flanker
International career
Years	Team	Apps	(Points)
2006–2014	Portugal	42	(14)

Tiago Maria Menezes Vilhena Girão (born 30 November 1984 in Lisbon) is a Portuguese rugby union footballer. He plays as a flanker.

He played for CDUL in Portugal, moving to CRC Madrid Noroeste, in Spain, for the season of 2007/08. He returned to CDUL at 2008/09. Moved back to Spanish championship in 2013/14 with CR Cisneros.

He holds 42 caps for Portugal, since his first match, in 2006, with 2 tries, 3 conversions, and 1 penalty scored, 19 points in aggregate. Girão played three times at the 2007 Rugby World Cup finals, in the matches with New Zealand, Italy and Romania, without scoring.

He also played at the 2009 Sevens World Cup in Dubai.
