= Justin Wilson (rugby union) =

New Zealand rugby union player (born 1978)

- Full name: Justin Carey Wilson
- Born: 25 December 1978 (age 47) Queanbeyan, NSW, Australia
- Height: 184 cm (6 ft 0 in)
- Weight: 85 kg (13 st 5 lb)

Rugby union career
- Position: Centre / Wing / Fullback
Provincial / State sides
Years	Team	Apps	(Points)
1998–00	Bay of Plenty	35	(80)
2001–02	Auckland	6	(10)
2005	Wellington	1	(0)
2006–07	Hawke's Bay	16	(0)
Super Rugby
Years	Team	Apps	(Points)
2001	Blues	6	(5)
2005	Hurricanes	1	(0)
International career
Years	Team	Apps	(Points)
2000	New Zealand "A"	2	(5)
2003–04	New Zealand Māori	3	(15)

Justin Carey Wilson (born 25 December 1978) is a New Zealand former professional rugby union player.

== Biography ==
Wilson was born in Queanbeyan, outside Canberra, and moved to New Zealand during his childhood. He played rugby league while attending Western Heights High School in Rotorua and was a Junior Kiwis representative player. Switching to rugby union, Wilson spent a few years playing in Western Australia after school and represented the state team.

A utility back, Wilson started in New Zealand provincial rugby with the Bay of Plenty in 1998. He earned NZ Sevens representation the following year and was in side that claimed the inaugural World Sevens Series title. In 2000, Wilson replaced an injured Daryl Lilley in the New Zealand "A" squad touring Europe, where he played matches against Wales "A" and France "A". He played six games for the Blues in the 2001 Super 12 season and once for the Hurricanes in the 2005 Super 12 season. Before retiring, Wilson had a stint in Spain, playing with CR El Salvador.
