= David Monreal (rugby union) =

- Born: David Monreal Izquierdo; 5 October 1975 (age 51) Ourense, Galicia, Spain
- Height: 1.80 cm (0.71 in)
- Weight: 98 kg (216 lb; 15 st 6 lb)

Rugby union career
Senior career
Years	Team	Apps	(Points)
1993-2010	RC L'Hospitalet		
2010-2014	Vigo RC		
International career
Years	Team	Apps	(Points)
2002-2004	Spain	15	(10)

David Monreal Izquierdo (born in Ourense, 5 November 1973) is a Spanish former rugby union international, with 16 international caps for Spain, between 2002 and 2004. He also played for Spain under-20 and Spain A, as well as for Catalonia between 1994 and 2005, becoming champion of the División de Honor, captaining the club during several seasons. He played as a hooker.

== Career ==
Brought up in L'Hospitalet de Llobregat, he started to play rugby at the age of 9 at his school in Bellvitge. He played for Rugby Club L'Hospitalet between 9 and 32 years of age. During his prime, the club was promoted to División de Honor (2001–02 season) for the first time in its history and remained in the top-flight division until the club got relegated during the 2003–04 season. Monreal debuted for Spain in 2002, being capped 16 times until 2004.

At the beginning of 2006, Monreal moved to New Zealand and started to coach a Christchurch club, playing a season for Burnside. In 2010 he was signed as player-coach for Vigo Rugby Club in División de Honor B, achieving the promotion during its first season. It was the first time that a Galician club was promoted to the top division of the Spanish rugby union. Under Monreal, the club managed to remain in the first division for three years in a row, until 2014, when Monreal left Vigo for his hometown Ourense to coach Ourense Rugby Club playing in the regional league. During the first season, Monreal brought the club to the victory of the regional league, and in its second season, managed to repeat the feat and making the club from Ourense compete for the first time in its history in División de Honor B.

== Personal life ==
He has two children, Miguel and Sabela Monreal.
