= Valladolid RAC =

Spanish rugby union club, based in Valladolid

VRAC Quesos Entrepinares
- Full name: Valladolid Rugby Asociación Club
- Founded: 1986; 40 years ago
- Location: Valladolid, Spain
- Ground: Estadio Pepe Rojo (Capacity: 5,000)
- Chairman: Jorge Calleja "Hollister"
- Coach: Diego Merino
- League: División de Honor
- 2023–24: División de Honor, 1st / W
1st kit	2nd kit

Official website
- vracrugby.com

Valladolid Rugby Asociación Club is a professional Spanish rugby union club. The club was established in 1986 and currently competes in the División de Honor de Rugby competition, the highest level of Spanish club rugby. The club are based in Valladolid in central Spain. VRAC play in blue and white colours. The team have in the past won both the Spanish League and the Copa del Rey de Rugby. They play at Estadio Pepe Rojo.

== Honours ==
- División de Honor: 14 (record)
  - Champions: 1998–99, 2000–01, 2011–12, 2012–13, 2013–14, 2014–15, 2016–17, 2017–18, 2018–19, 2019–20, 2020–21, 2022–23, 2023–24, 2025–26
- Copa del Rey: 7
  - Champions: 1997–98, 2009–10, 2013–14, 2014–15, 2017–18, 2022–23, 2024–25
- Supercopa de España: 10 (record)
  - Champions: 2010, 2012, 2013, 2014, 2015, 2016, 2017, 2019, 2025, 2026
- Copa Ibérica de Rugby: 8 (record)
  - Champions: 2014, 2017, 2018, 2019, 2020, 2021, 2023, 2024

== European rugby ==
Valladolid RAC's first foray into Europe was in the 2001–02 European Challenge Cup. Playing in a pool with London Irish (England), Dax (France) and L'Aquila (Italy), they lost all six games.

The 2003–04 season saw a change in format in the European Challenge Cup. Teams played in a knockout format, over two legs, in each round. First round losing teams then played in a new, third tier, Shield competition. Having lost heavily home and away to England's Newcastle Falcons in Round 1 of the 2003–04 European Challenge Cup, they dropped into the European Shield. Here their performance against Italy's Overmach Parma was better, but nevertheless they again lost home and away.

The 2004–05 season was a close repeat of 2003–04: heavy losses home and away to Italy's Viadana in the Challenge Cup was followed by even heavier defeats at the hands of England's Leeds in the Shield.

As the winners of the 2011–12 División de Honor de Rugby and the championship playoff, Valladolid RAC qualified to play in the 2012–13 European Challenge Cup but turned down the opportunity due to economic factors. Gernika RT took their place and represented Spain.

As the winners of the 2013–14 División de Honor championship, VRAC qualified to play the Iberian Rugby Cup against CDUL of Lisbon, winning the game and the title.

In 2015/16 season, Valladolid RAC as the champion of the 2014/15 División de Honor championship, represented Spain at the Qualifying Competition of the European Rugby Challenge Cup. In this competition VRAC won two games, against Royal Kituro Rugby Club (Belgium) and Mogliano Rugby (Italy) but lost against Grupo Desportivo Direito (Portugal) and Timișoara Saracens (Romania).

=== Summary ===
Season	Played	Won	Drew	Lost	PF	PA	PD
2001–02 Challenge Cup	6	0	0	6	53	307	−254
2003–04 Challenge Cup	2	0	0	2	37	137	−100
2003–04 Shield	2	0	0	2	19	42	−23
2004–05 Challenge Cup	2	0	0	2	10	147	−137
2004–05 Shield	2	0	0	2	11	174	−163
2015/16 European Rugby Challenge Cup Qualifying Competition	4	2	0	2	114	68	46
Summary	18	2	0	16	234	875	−641

=== International honours ===
- (Spain) Víctor Acevedo
- (Spain) Fernando de la Calle
- (Spain) Aníbal Fernando Bonan
- (Spain) Benjamín Pardo
- (Spain) Nacho Müller
- (New Zealand) Glen Rolls
- (Spain) Nacho Molina

=== Other notable players ===
- Sgt. Adam Newton (English Armed Services XV, England U18)
- Gareth Griffiths (former player from Bath, international England U18, U19)
- Mike Davis (International New Zealand Sevens)
- Lisandro Arbizu (Player/Coach 2012-2014, Argentina international 1990-2005 Cpt 1992-1999)

== Season to season ==
Season	Tier	Division	Pos.	Notes
1987–88	2	División de Honor B	9th	
1988–89	2	División de Honor B	8th	
1989–90	2	División de Honor B	2nd	
1990–91	2	División de Honor B	1st	Promoted
1991–92	1	División de Honor	10th	
1992–93	1	División de Honor	10th	
1993–94	1	División de Honor	4th	
1994–95	1	División de Honor	3rd	
1995–96	1	División de Honor	7th	
1996–97	1	División de Honor	4th	
1997–98	1	División de Honor	4th	Cup champion
1998–99	1	División de Honor	1st	League champion
1999–00	1	División de Honor	5th	
2000–01	1	División de Honor	1st	League champion
2001–02	1	División de Honor	5th	
2002–03	1	División de Honor	3rd	
2003–04	1	División de Honor	3rd	
2004–05	1	División de Honor	4th	
2005–06	1	División de Honor	6th	
2006–07	1	División de Honor	4th	
2007–08	1	División de Honor	4th	
2008–09	1	División de Honor	4th	

Season	Tier	Division	Pos.	Notes
2009–10	1	División de Honor	4th	Cup champion
2010–11	1	División de Honor	5th	
2011–12	1	División de Honor	1st / W	League champion
2012–13	1	División de Honor	1st / W	League champion
2013–14	1	División de Honor	1st / W	League/Cup champion
2014–15	1	División de Honor	1st / W	League/Cup champion
2015–16	1	División de Honor	1st / F	
2016–17	1	División de Honor	2nd / W	League champion
2017–18	1	División de Honor	1st / W	League/Cup champion
2018–19	1	División de Honor	2nd / W	League champion
2019–20	1	División de Honor	1st	League champion
2020–21	1	División de Honor	1st / W	League champion
2021–22	1	División de Honor	9th	
2022–23	1	División de Honor	1st / W	League champion
2023–24	1	División de Honor	1st / W	League champion
2024–25	1	División de Honor	-	

- 34 seasons in División de Honor

== See also ==
- Rugby union in Spain
