= Aparejadores Rugby =

Spanish rugby union club, based in Burgos

Recoletas Burgos Caja Rural
- Full name: Club Deportivo Aparejadores Rugby Burgos
- Founded: 2006; 20 years ago
- Location: Burgos, Spain
- Ground: San Amaro
- President: Manuel Vadillo
- Coach: José Ignacio García
- League: División de Honor de Rugby
- 2023-24: 2nd
1st kit	2nd kit

Aparejadores Rugby Club is a Spanish rugby union team based in Burgos which competes in the División de Honor de Rugby.

== Titles ==
- Spanish championship
  - Runners-up: 2023, 2024
- Spanish King's cup
  - Champions: 2024
  - Runners-up: 2021, 2023
- Spanish super cup
  - Champions: 2023, 2024
- Spanish second division
  - Champions: 2017 and 2018

== History ==
The club was founded in 2006 after the merging of Burgos Rugby Club and Aparejadores Rugby Club, the team of the Technical Architecture School of the University of Burgos. "Aparejadores" is literally "building engineers" or "technical surveyors".

In January 2014, the club was promoted for the first time to División de Honor B de Rugby and just four years later won promotion to Spain's top tier.

== Season to season ==
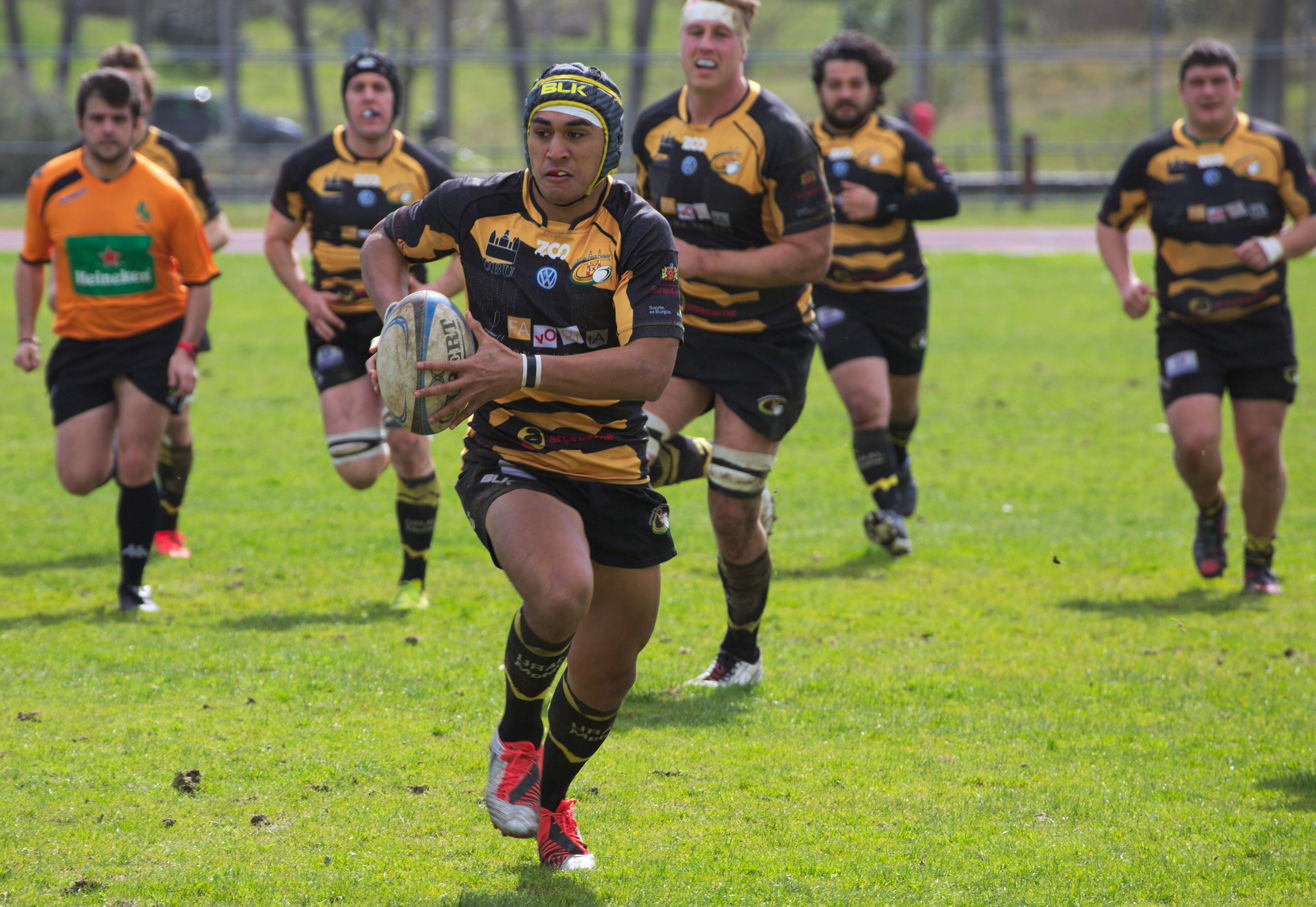
Aparejadores Rugby players during a match in March 2017.

Season	Tier	Division	Pos.	Notes
2012–13	4	Liga Regional	2nd	Promoted
2013–14	3	Primera Nacional	2nd	Promoted
2014–15	2	División de Honor B	4th	
2015–16	2	División de Honor B	2nd	
2016–17	2	División de Honor B	1st	
2017–18	2	División de Honor B	1st	Promoted
2018–19	1	División de Honor	5th	
2019–20	1	División de Honor	8th	
2020–21	1	División de Honor	6th	
2021–22	1	División de Honor	8th	
2022–23	1	División de Honor	2nd	
2023–24	1	División de Honor	2nd	
2024–25	1	División de Honor	-	
