= Javier Miranda =

Spanish businessman (1954–2019)

Javier Miranda Martínez (15 March 1954 – 26 March 2019) was a Spanish businessman who was the president of CA Osasuna from 1998 to 2002. During his one term in office, the team won promotion from Segunda División in 1999–2000 and avoided relegation from La Liga.

== Biography ==
Miranda was born in Vitoria-Gasteiz to a father from Tudela and a mother from La Rioja, and was raised in Pamplona from the age of six months. He ran several businesses in hotels and cafés, while also singing with orchestras.

On 29 January 1998, Miranda was elected president of CA Osasuna by 1,732 votes to 1,305 against his opponent, politician Pedro Pegenaute. He cried upon hearing the result, and said that he had been the son of a miner, and that the next president could be the son of a builder, plumber or lawyer.

Osasuna were then in the Segunda División, and won promotion in 1999–2000 under manager Miguel Ángel Lotina; one of Miranda's first decisions was not to renew the contract with previous manager Enrique Martin. Having avoided relegation from La Liga with a 1–0 win at Real Sociedad on the last day of the 2000–01 season, Miranda attracted attention for bathing in San Sebastián's Beach of La Concha with fans and reporters. He did not present himself for re-election in 2002.

Miranda was praised by supporters for an incident in which he confronted police who would not let two members enter the El Sadar Stadium. He maintained popularity with fans after leaving the club, and was known by them as "the fan who became president".

A practicing Catholic, Miranda was particularly devoted to his namesake saint Francis Xavier, and made pilgrimages to Santiago de Compostela and Rome. He married Gloria Goñi, with whom he had a son and a daughter. After seven months of living with pancreatic cancer, he died at hospital in Pamplona on 26 March 2019, aged 65.
