= Real Ciencias RC =

Spanish rugby union team, based in Seville

Cajasol Real Ciencias Sevilla
- Full name: Real Ciencias Rugby Club
- Founded: 1972; 54 years ago
- Location: Seville, Spain
- Ground: Instalaciones Deportivas La Cartuja (Capacity: 3,000)
- President: Rafael Montserrat
- Coach: Tomás Carrió
- League: División de Honor
- 2024-25: 6th / Quarter-finals
1st kit	2nd kit

Official website
- www.rugbyciencias.com

Cajasol Real Ciencias Sevilla is a professional Spanish rugby union team based in Seville, Spain.

== Honours ==
- Spanish championship
  - Champions: 1992 and 1994
- Spanish King's cup
  - Champions: 1994, 1995 and 1996
  - Runners-up: 1997 and 2022
- Spanish second division
  - Champions: 2004, 2016 and 2019
- Copa Ibérica
  - Champions: 1995
  - Runners-up: 1993

== Season by season ==
Season	Tier	Division	Pos.	Notes
1975–76	2	Primera Nacional	2nd	
1976–77	2	Primera Nacional	2nd	
1977–78	2	Primera Nacional	3rd	↑
1978–79	1	División de Honor	6th	
1979–80	1	División de Honor	5th	
1980–81	1	División de Honor	1st	
1981–82	1	División de Honor	1st	↓
1982–83	2	Primera Nacional	7th	↓
1983–84	3	Segunda Nacional	1st	↑
1984–85	2	Primera Nacional	2nd	
1985–86	2	Primera Nacional	6th	
1986–87	2	Primera Nacional	3rd	
1987–88	2	Primera Nacional	1st	↑
1988–89	1	División de Honor	6th	
1989–90	1	División de Honor	3rd	
1990–91	1	División de Honor	9th	
1991–92	1	División de Honor	1st	
1992–93	1	División de Honor	3rd	
1993–94	1	División de Honor	1st	Cup champion
1994–95	1	División de Honor	4th	Cup champion
1995–96	1	División de Honor	2nd	Cup champion
1996–97	1	División de Honor	5th	
1997–98	1	División de Honor	7th	
1998–99	1	División de Honor	3rd	
1999–00	1	División de Honor	6th	
2000–01	1	División de Honor	4th	
2001–02	1	División de Honor	9th	↓
2002–03	2	División de Honor B	3rd	
2003–04	2	División de Honor B	1st	↑
2004–05	1	División de Honor	6th	
2005–06	1	División de Honor	10th	↓
2006–07	2	División de Honor B	1st	↑
2007–08	1	División de Honor	2nd	
2008–09	1	División de Honor	3rd	
2009–10	1	División de Honor	3rd	

Season	Tier	Division	Pos.	Notes
2010–11	1	División de Honor	6th	
2011–12	1	División de Honor	8th	
2012–13	1	División de Honor	7th	
2013–14	1	División de Honor	12th	↓
2014–15	2	División de Honor B	2nd	
2015–16	2	División de Honor B	1st	↑
2016–17	1	División de Honor	12th	↓
2017–18	2	División de Honor B	1st	
2018–19	2	División de Honor B	1st	↑
2019–20	1	División de Honor	9th	
2020–21	1	División de Honor	8th	
2021–22	1	División de Honor	5th	
2022–23	1	División de Honor	3rd	
2023–24	1	División de Honor	3rd	
2024–25	1	División de Honor	6th	
2025–26	1	División de Honor		

- 35 seasons in División de Honor (Last season told 2025-26)
- 7 seasons in División de Honor B

=== International honours ===
- (Spain) Javier de Juan
- (Spain) Corey Smith
- (Tonga) Kurt Morath
- (Uruguay) Oscar Durán
- (Uruguay) Leonardo de Oliveira
- (Spain) Juan Francisco Galindo
- (Spain) Sebastián Hattori
- (Spain) José María Bohórquez
- (Spain) Leandro Fernández
- (Spain) Jesús Recuerda
- (Spain) Rafael Camacho
- (Spain) Alejandro Ortega
- (Spain) Carlos Arenas
- (Spain) Jeremías Palumbo
- (Spain) Manuel Mazo
- (Spain) Jorge Prieto

=== Other notable players ===
- (Italy) Andrea Bresolin Former player from Petrarca Padova in italien Super10
