= Pedro Martín (rugby union) =

Spain international rugby union player

Pedro Martín Enrique (born Valladolid, 1987) is a Spanish rugby union player. He plays as a fullback or as a wing.

He comes from a family with a large rugby following. He started his career at Valladolid Rugby Asociación Club. His current team is the French side Aviron Bayonnais in the Top 14 league.

He counts 13 caps for Spain, with 1 try scored, 5 points in aggregate, since 2006.
