= CR Cisneros =

Spanish rugby union club, based in Madrid

Complutense Cisneros
- Full name: Club de Rugby Cisneros
- Founded: 1943; 83 years ago
- Location: Madrid, Spain
- Ground: Campo Central de la Ciudad Universitaria (Capacity: 12,400)
- Chairman: Gonzalo Barbadillo
- Coach: Valentin Telleriarte
- League: Division de Honor
- 2024–25: Division de Honor, 2nd
1st kit	2nd kit

Official website
- www.rugbycisneros.com

Club de Rugby Cisneros is a Spanish rugby union club. The club currently competes in the Division de Honor, the top-flight competition of Spanish club rugby. The club is based in Madrid, Spain.

== Honours ==
- División de Honor: 2
  - Champions: 1975–76, 1984–85
- Copa del Rey: 4
  - Champions: 1967, 1969, 1979, 1982

== Season by season ==
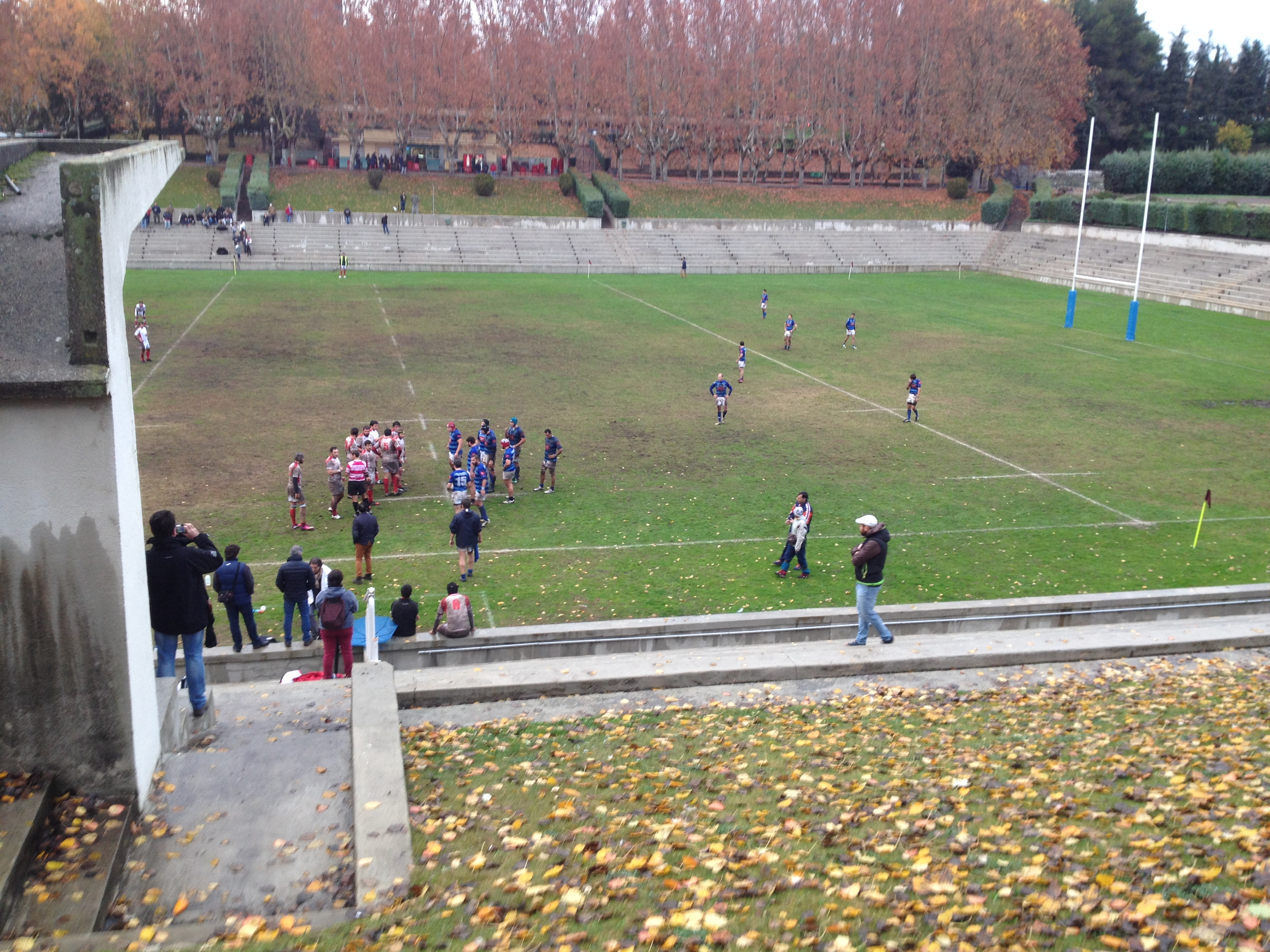
CR Cisneros (in blue) playing a match in 2014 at Central de la Ciudad Universitaria

Season	Tier	Division	Pos.	Notes
1969–70	1	División de Honor	5th	
1970–71	1	División de Honor	7th	
1971–72		DNP		
1972–73	2	Primera Nacional	1st	↑
1973–74	1	División de Honor	6th	
1974–75	1	División de Honor	2nd	
1975–76	1	División de Honor	1st	League champion
1976–77	1	División de Honor	3rd	
1977–78	1	División de Honor	5th	
1978–79	1	División de Honor	x	Cup champion
1979–80	1	División de Honor	x	
1980–81	1	División de Honor	x	
1981–82	1	División de Honor	x	Cup champion
1982–83	1	División de Honor	6th	↓
1983–84	2	Primera Nacional	1st	↑
1984–85	1	División de Honor	1st	League champion
1985–86	1	División de Honor	3rd	
1986–87	1	División de Honor	5th	
1987–88	1	División de Honor	4th	
1988–89	1	División de Honor	2nd	
1989–90	1	División de Honor	8th	
1990–91	1	División de Honor	6th	
1991–92	1	División de Honor	7th	
1992–93	1	División de Honor	4th	
1993–94	1	División de Honor	10th	
1994–95	1	División de Honor	7th	
1995–96	1	División de Honor	4th	
1996–97	1	División de Honor	7th	
1997–98	1	División de Honor	10th	↓
1998–99	2	División de Honor B	3rd	
1999–00	2	División de Honor B	3rd	
2000–01	2	División de Honor B	2nd	↑
2001–02	1	División de Honor	8th	
2002–03	1	División de Honor	10th	↓
2003–04	2	División de Honor B	8th	
2004–05	2	División de Honor B	5th	
2005–06	2	División de Honor B	1st	↑
2006–07	1	División de Honor	10th	↓
2007–08	2	División de Honor B	3rd	
2008–09	2	División de Honor B	6th	
2009–10	2	División de Honor B	4th	
2010–11	2	División de Honor B	3rd	

Season	Tier	Division	Pos.	Notes
2011–12	2	División de Honor B	2nd	↑
2012–13	1	División de Honor	9th	
2013–14	1	División de Honor	3rd / SF	
2014–15	1	División de Honor	3rd / SF	
2015–16	1	División de Honor	5th	
2016–17	1	División de Honor	5th	
2017–18	1	División de Honor	9th	
2018–19	1	División de Honor	10th	
2019–20	1	División de Honor	10th	
2020–21	1	División de Honor	7th	
2021–22	1	División de Honor	6th	
2022–23	1	División de Honor	7th	
2023–24	1	División de Honor	7th	
2024–25	1	División de Honor	2nd/F	

- 41 seasons in División de Honor (Last season told 2024-25)

== See also ==
- Rugby union in Spain
