= Steve Tuineau =

Spain international rugby union player

- Born: September 20, 1969 (age 57) Nuku'alofa, Tonga
- Height: 6 ft 5 in (1.96 m)
- Weight: 231 lb (105 kg; 16 st 7 lb)
- Occupation: Receptionist

Rugby union career
- Position: Lock
Senior career
Years	Team	Apps	(Points)
1996-2003	U.E. Santboiana		
International career
Years	Team	Apps	(Points)
1997-2003	Spain	29	(20)

Steve Tuineau Iloa (born 20 September 1969) is a Tongan-born former Spanish rugby union player. He represented Spain at the 1999 Rugby World Cup.

He made his debut for Spain against Andorra in Andorra la Vella on 8 November 1997. His last appearance was against the United States at Fort Lauderdale, Florida on 27 April 2003.
