= División de Honor de Rugby =

Spanish rugby union competition

- Current season, competition or edition: 2026–27 División de Honor de Rugby
- Sport: Rugby union
- Founded: 1953; 73 years ago
- Owner: Federación Española de Rugby
- No. of teams: 11
- Country: Spain
- Most recent champion: Valladolid (14th title)
- Most titles: Valladolid RAC (14 titles)
- Broadcaster: Movistar Plus+
- Sponsors: Generali; Volvo Cars; KPMG; Silbö Telecom
- Relegation to: División de Honor Élite
- Related competitions: Copa del Rey de Rugby Supercopa de España de Rugby
- Website: ferugby.es

The División de Honor de Rugby is Spain's top level professional men's rugby union competition. The División de Honor de Rugby Championship is organised by the Federación Española de Rugby (Spanish Rugby Federation) and currently consists of 11 teams.

The last-placed team in the competition is relegated at the end of the season to the División de Honor Élite, Spain's second level of men's rugby union. The team finishing 11th enters a relegation/promotion playoff with the runner-up from the Division de Honor B playoffs.

== Format ==
The División de Honor season takes place between September and May, with every team playing each other home and away for a total of 22 matches. Points are awarded according to the following:

- 4 points for a win
- 2 points for a draw
- 1 bonus point is awarded to a team scoring 3 or more tries in a match than the other team
- 1 bonus point is awarded to a team that loses a match by 7 points or fewer

The six teams with the highest number of points at the end of 22 rounds of matches qualify for the championship playoffs. The top two teams win a semi-final berth automatically, while the next four teams participate in semi-final play-off to take the remaining two spots.

=== Promotion and relegation ===
The bottom team in the standings is relegated to the División de Honor B, while the team finishing 11th plays in the promotion/relegation playoff against a team from the second tier of rugby union in Spain.

The top team from the División de Honor B is promoted to the División de Honor.

== Current Teams ==
División de Honor teams for 2025-26

Team	Manager	Captain	Stadium	Capacity
Alcobendas	Javier Garrido	Diego de Minteguiaga	Campo de Rugby Las Terrazas	2,000
Aparejadores Burgos	José Basso	Pablo Rascón	CD San Amaro	1,000
Real Ciencias	Tomás Carrió	Michael Hogg	Instalaciones Deportivas La Cartuja	3,000
Complutense Cisneros	Valentin Telleriarte	Ike Irusta	Estadio Nacional Complutense	12,400
El Salvador	Juan Carlos Pérez	Facundo Munilla	Estadio Pepe Rojo	5,000
FC Barcelona	Santiago Monteagudo	Rochedi Mirabet	La Teixonera	500
La Vila	Hernan Diego Quirelli	Gastón Demergasso	Estadio de Rugby "El Pantano"	1,550
Liceo Francés	Fernando Díez		Estadio Ramon Urtubi	500
Ordizia	Federico Gallo	Oier Goia	Estadio Municipal de Altamira	2,000
Santboiana	Sergio Guerrero		Estadi Baldiri Aleu	3,500
VRAC	Diego Merino	Ilaitia Gavidi	Estadio Pepe Rojo	5,000

== History ==
The Spanish Rugby Championship (now the Copa del Rey) was created in 1926, and was the only national rugby competition for decades. A national league was not considered until the 1950s, with the first season being 1952–53. Four teams competed: two from Catalonia and two from Castille.

FC Barcelona won the league that year and retained the title the following season, but the league folded. There were various attempts to relaunch it, but none bore fruit until the 1969–70 season, when the National Rugby League was created. Six clubs competed in the first division, which was increased to eight in 1970-71 and then ten in 1972–73.

For the 1978–79 season, the league was restructured into four regional groups of eight teams. The top team from each region were crowned champions.

From the 1979–1980 season, the four regional champions progressed to a final stage, named the Superliga. This format was maintained until the 1982–1983 season, when a national division of eight teams was created.

=== Performance by season ===
The following scrollable table shows the teams' final league positions in each season.

The playoff champions - not necessarily the team finishing first in the league - are highlighted in gold, except in 1979 when the championship was shared.

For the years 1979–1982, all participating teams are denoted with an X.

Team	Seasons	🏆	24-25	23-24	22-23	21-22	20-21	19-20	18-19	17-18	16-17	15-16	14-15	13-14	12-13	11-12	10-11	09-10	08-09	07-08	06-07	05-06	04-05	03-04	02-03	01-02	00-01	99-00	98-99	97-98	96-97	95-96	94-95	93-94	92-93	91-92	90-91	89-90	88-89	87-88	86-87	85-86	84-85	83-84	82-83	81-82	80-81	79-80	78-79	77-78	76-77	75-76	74-75	73-74	72-73	71-72	70-71	69-70	53-54	52-53
Santboiana	56	8	5	6	4	2	9	5	7	6	4	4	2	8	2	3	7	6	5	8	3	1	1	4	5	4	8	3	2	2	1	1	5	7	5	2	5	5	1	2	1	2	7	1	3	x	x	x	x	7	6	4	6	7	4	3	4			3
Complutense Cisneros	42	2	7	7	7	6	7	10	10	9	5	5	3	3	7						10				10	8				10	7	4	7	10	4	7	6	8	2	4	5	3	1		6	x	x	x	x	5	3	1	2	5			7	5
El Salvador	40	9	4	4	1	3	2	2	2	1	2	5	2	4	7	3	1	2	1	1	2	2	1	1	2	7	2	5	1		9	6	3	7	6	1	2	5	3	8														3	2	2
Pozuelo	39	5	11	10	11							12	8	5	6			5	1	3	2		5	2	4	3	6	1	4	3	6	5				12	10	10	4	7						x	x	x	x	8	7	5	4	3	1	1	1	3
Valladolid	37	13	1	1	1	9	2	1	1	1	2	1	1	1	1	1	5	4	4	4	4	6	4	3	3	5	1	5	1	4	4	7	3	4	10	10										x	x	x
Getxo RT	35	1					12			12	11	8	9	7	8	5			10	5	8	5	7	8		10	9	8	8	8	2	3	2	2	1	5	3	4		9	4	4		9	5	x	x		x
Ciencias	34	2	6	3	3	5	8	9			12			12	9	8	6	3	3	2		10	6			9	4	6	3	7	5	2	4	1	3	1	9	3	6							4	4	x	x
Arquitectura	29	9																					10					10		11	3	6	1	5	6	4	4	1	3	1	2	1	3	7	4	1	1	x	x	2	1	2	1	1	2	4
FC Barcelona	28	2	8	11	6	7	5	6	6	7	10	7	11							10	6																					7	4	5		3	x	x	x				10	9	6	8	3	2	1	1
Valencia	22	1																						10	7				12	9	9	8		11		11	8	6	9	5	3	8	5	6	1	x	3	3	x	6
Ordizia RE	22	-	9	9	8	4	4	4	4	5	7	9	7	6	5	2	2	7	7	6	7	7																								x		x
Alcobendas	21	1	3	5		3	1	3	3	3	3	6				10	8			9		9	8	7	2	1	5						12														x		x
At. San Sebastián	17	3																																								10	2	4	2	x	x	x	1	1	8	8	7	4	8	6	5	1
Gernika RT	16	-			12	12			12	8	8	11	6	9	3	6	4	8																	12	8	7									x
CAU Madrid	15	2																																								9	8	3		x	x	1	1	3	2	3	3	6	7		8	4
RC Cornellà	15	1																															10					12	8				9	8	7	x	x	x	1	4	5	6		10	9
Hernani CRE	15	-						12	9	11	9	10	10	10	11																										10		10	2		2	2	2	x
Liceo Francés	14	-																			9	8					3	4	7	5			9	8	2	3	2	7			9						x
CDU Valladolid	14	-																																					12	10	7	5	6			x	x	x	x	10	4	9	8	8
Bera Bera RT	12	-															9	9	6	7	5	4	3	5							10		11	9	8
CN Barcelona	11	-																																												x	x	x	x	9		10	5	2	5	7			3
La Vila	10	1	10		13	11			11	10					12	4	1	2	8
Independiente	10	-					11	7	8	4	6	3	4	4																																		x	x
BUC	10	-																				3										10	8	6	9			11	10	6							x		x
CDU Sevilla	9	-																					9	6	6	6	2		10	6	8			12
Les Abelles	9	-	12	8	10	10	10											10	9																										8		x
CAR / RACA	8	1																																												x	x	4	1		9	7	9
CN Montjuïc	7	-																											11	10					11	9										x		x	x
Aparejadores	7	-	2	2	2	8	6	8	5
Olímpico RC	6	-																																			11	9	7							x		x			10
CDU Granada	5	-																										9	6																		x	x	x
Vigo RC	4	-											12	11	10	9
Oviedo RC	4	-																									10	7	9								12
Filosofía y Letras RC	4	-																																					11	8	6	6
Irún RT	4	-																																												x	x	x	x
Zaharrean RT	4	-																																												x	x	x	x
Sevilla FC	4	-																																												x	x	x	x
CR Divina Pastora	4	-																																												x	x	x	x
CEU Barcelona	4	-																																																					10	5	6	6
CAU Valencia	3	-													10								9	7
CR At.Portuense	3	-																																												x	x	x
CDU Bilbao	3	-																																												x	x	x
GEiEG	3	-																																												x	x	x
Juv. Karmen	3	-																																												x		x	x
Bilbao RC	3	-																																													x	x	x
Belenos	2	-		12	9
L'Hospitalet	2	-																						9	8
Tatami RC	2	-																																										10				x
CN Poble Nou	2	-																																												x			x
Hípica RC	2	-																																													x	x
Atlético Madrid	2	-																																																									2	2
Bathco	1	-						11
CDU Córdoba	1	-																																														x
Sporting Gijón	1	-																																															x
CDC San José	1	-																																															x
CM Isabel la Católica	1	-																																														x
Arquitectos Granada	1	-																																															x
Arquitectura Sevilla	1	-																																															x
SEU Madrid	1	-																																																									4
AD Plus Ultra	0	-																																																										4|

== Past winners ==
Year	Champion	Runner-up	Third place
1953	(Catalonia) FC Barcelona	(Community of Madrid) Atlético Madrid	(Catalonia) Santboiana
1954	(Catalonia) FC Barcelona	(Community of Madrid) Atlético Madrid	(Catalonia) Natació Barcelona
1955–69	Not held		
1970	(Basque Country (autonomous community)) Atlético San Sebastián	(Catalonia) FC Barcelona	(Community of Madrid) Canoe
1971	(Community of Madrid) Canoe	(Castile and León) El Salvador	(Catalonia) FC Barcelona
1972	(Community of Madrid) Canoe	(Castile and León) El Salvador	(Catalonia) Santboiana
1973	(Community of Madrid) Canoe	(Community of Madrid) Arquitectura	(Castile and León) El Salvador
1974	(Community of Madrid) Arquitectura	(Catalonia) Natació Barcelona	(Community of Madrid) Canoe
1975	(Community of Madrid) Arquitectura	(Community of Madrid) Cisneros	(Community of Madrid) CAU Madrid
1976	(Community of Madrid) Cisneros	(Community of Madrid) Arquitectura	(Community of Madrid) CAU Madrid
1977	(Community of Madrid) Arquitectura	(Community of Madrid) CAU Madrid	(Community of Madrid) Cisneros
1978	(Basque Country (autonomous community)) Atlético San Sebastián	(Community of Madrid) Arquitectura	(Community of Madrid) CAU Madrid
1979	(Basque Country (autonomous community)) Atlético San Sebastián	(Basque Country (autonomous community)) Hernani	(Basque Country (autonomous community)) Irún
1979	(Community of Madrid) CAU Madrid	(Community of Madrid) Cisneros	(Community of Madrid) Arquitectura
1979	(Catalonia) Cornellà	(Catalonia) Santboiana	(Valencian Community) Valencia
1979	(Andalusia) Amigos del Rugby	(Andalusia) Sevilla FC	(Andalusia) Universidad de Granada
1980	(Community of Madrid) CAU Madrid	(Basque Country (autonomous community)) Hernani	(Valencian Community) Valencia
1981	(Community of Madrid) Arquitectura	(Basque Country (autonomous community)) Hernani	(Valencian Community) Valencia
1982	(Community of Madrid) Arquitectura	(Basque Country (autonomous community)) Hernani	(Catalonia) FC Barcelona
1983	(Valencian Community) Valencia	(Basque Country (autonomous community)) Atlético San Sebastián	(Catalonia) Santboiana
1984	(Catalonia) Santboiana	(Community of Madrid) CAU Madrid	(Basque Country (autonomous community)) Hernani
1985	(Community of Madrid) Cisneros	(Basque Country (autonomous community)) Atlético San Sebastián	(Community of Madrid) Arquitectura
1986	(Community of Madrid) Arquitectura	(Catalonia) Santboiana	(Community of Madrid) Cisneros
1987	(Catalonia) Santboiana	(Community of Madrid) Arquitectura	(Valencian Community) Valencia
1988	(Community of Madrid) Arquitectura	(Catalonia) Santboiana	(Castile and León) El Salvador
1989	(Catalonia) Santboiana	(Community of Madrid) CR Complutense Cisneros	(Community of Madrid) Arquitectura
1990	(Community of Madrid) Arquitectura	(Castile and León) El Salvador	(Andalusia) Ciencias Sevilla
1991	(Castile and León) El Salvador	(Community of Madrid) Liceo Francés	(Basque Country (autonomous community)) Getxo
1992	(Andalusia) Ciencias Sevilla	(Catalonia) Santboiana	(Community of Madrid) Liceo Francés
1993	(Basque Country (autonomous community)) Getxo	(Community of Madrid) Liceo Francés	(Andalusia) Ciencias Sevilla
1994	(Andalusia) Ciencias Sevilla	(Basque Country (autonomous community)) Getxo	(Castile and León) El Salvador
1995	(Community of Madrid) Arquitectura	(Basque Country (autonomous community)) Getxo	(Castile and León) Valladolid
1996	(Catalonia) Santboiana	(Andalusia) Ciencias Sevilla	(Basque Country (autonomous community)) Getxo
1997	(Catalonia) Santboiana	(Basque Country (autonomous community)) Getxo	(Community of Madrid) Arquitectura
1998	(Castile and León) El Salvador	(Catalonia) Santboiana	(Community of Madrid) Real Canoe
1999	(Castile and León) Valladolid	(Catalonia) Santboiana	(Andalusia) Ciencias Sevilla
2000	(Community of Madrid) Real Canoe	(Castile and León) El Salvador	(Catalonia) Santboiana
2001	(Castile and León) Valladolid	(Andalusia) Universidad de Sevilla	(Community of Madrid) Liceo Francés
2002	(Community of Madrid) Moraleja Alcobendas	(Castile and León) El Salvador	(Community of Madrid) Madrid 2012
2003	(Castile and León) El Salvador	(Community of Madrid) Moraleja Alcobendas	(Castile and León) Valladolid
2004	(Castile and León) El Salvador	(Community of Madrid) UCM 2M12	(Castile and León) Valladolid RAC
2005	(Catalonia) Santboiana	(Castile and León) El Salvador	(Basque Country (autonomous community)) Bera Bera
2006	(Catalonia) Santboiana	(Castile and León) El Salvador	(Catalonia) USAP BCN
2007	(Castile and León) El Salvador	(Community of Madrid) Madrid Noroeste	(Catalonia) Santboiana
2008	(Castile and León) El Salvador	(Andalusia) Ciencias Sevilla	(Community of Madrid) Pozuelo Boadilla
2009	(Community of Madrid) CRC Madrid	(Castile and León) El Salvador	(Andalusia) Ciencias Sevilla
2010	(Castile and León) El Salvador	(Valencian Community) La Vila	(Andalusia) Ciencias Sevilla
2011	(Valencian Community) La Vila	(Basque Country (autonomous community)) Ordizia	(Castile and León) El Salvador
2012	(Castile and León) Valladolid	(Basque Country (autonomous community)) Ordizia	(Catalonia) Santboiana
2013	(Castile and León) Valladolid	(Catalonia) Santboiana	(Basque Country (autonomous community)) Gernika
2014	(Castile and León) Valladolid	(Castile and León) El Salvador	(Community of Madrid) CR Complutense Cisneros
2015	(Castile and León) Valladolid	(Catalonia) Santboiana	(Community of Madrid) Complutense Cisneros
2016	(Castile and León) El Salvador	(Castile and León) Valladolid	(Cantabria) Bathco Independiente
2017	(Castile and León) Valladolid	(Castile and León) El Salvador	(Community of Madrid) Alcobendas
2018	(Castile and León) Valladolid	(Castile and León) El Salvador	(Community of Madrid) Alcobendas
2019	(Castile and León) Valladolid	(Castile and León) El Salvador	(Community of Madrid) Alcobendas
2020	(Castile and León) Valladolid	(Castile and León) El Salvador	(Community of Madrid) Alcobendas
2021	(Castile and León) Valladolid	(Community of Madrid) Alcobendas	(Castile and León) El Salvador
2022	(Catalonia) Santboiana	(Basque Country (autonomous community)) AMPO Ordizia	(Castile and León) El Salvador
2023	(Castile and León) Valladolid	(Castile and León) Recoletas Burgos–UBU	(Andalusia) Real Ciencias Enerside
2024	(Castile and León) Valladolid	(Castile and León) Recoletas Burgos–Caja Rural	(Andalusia) Labiana Real Ciencias
2025	(Castile and León) El Salvador	(Community of Madrid) Complutense Cisneros	(Castile and León) Valladolid
2026	(Castile and León) Valladolid	(Castile and León) Recoletas Burgos–Caja Rural	(Community of Madrid) Alcobendas

=== Titles by team ===
Team	Titles	Year	Region
Valladolid	14	1999, 2001, 2012, 2013, 2014, 2015, 2017, 2018, 2019, 2020, 2021, 2023, 2024, 2026	(Castile and León)
El Salvador	9	1991, 1998, 2003, 2004, 2007, 2008, 2010, 2016, 2025	(Castile and León)
Arquitectura	9	1974, 1975, 1977, 1981, 1982, 1986, 1988, 1990, 1995	(Community of Madrid)
Santboiana	8	1984, 1987, 1989, 1996, 1997, 2005, 2006, 2022	(Catalonia)
Canoe/CRC Pozuelo	5	1971, 1972, 1973, 2000, 2009	(Community of Madrid)
Atlético San Sebastián	3	1970, 1978, 1979^{*}	(Basque Country (autonomous community))
Ciencias Sevilla	2	1992, 1994	(Andalusia)
Cisneros	2	1976, 1985	(Community of Madrid)
CAU Madrid	2	1979^{*}, 1980	(Community of Madrid)
FC Barcelona	2	1953, 1954	(Catalonia)
La Vila	1	2011	(Valencian Community)
Moraleja Alcobendas	1	2002	(Community of Madrid)
Getxo	1	1993	(Basque Country (autonomous community))
Valencia	1	1983	(Valencian Community)
Amigos del Rugby	1	1979^{*}	(Andalusia)
Cornellà	1	1979^{*}	(Catalonia)
^{*}1978–79 season; 4 groups competition format, thus 4 champions.

== See also ==
- División de Honor B de Rugby
- Copa del Rey de Rugby
- Supercopa de España de Rugby
- Copa Ibérica de Rugby/Taça Iberica de Rugby
- División de Honor Femenina de Rugby
- Rugby union in Spain
