= CR Les Abelles =

Spanish rugby union club, based in Valencia

Les Abelles
- Full name: Club de Rugby Les Abelles
- Nickname: Abejorros
- Founded: 1971; 55 years ago
- Ground(s): Polideportivo Quatre Carreres, Valencia (Capacity: 500)
- President: Antonio Márquez (Oso)
- Coach: Guillermo Ahuir
- League: División de Honor
1st kit	2nd kit

Official website
- lesabelles.net/web/

Club de Rugby Les Abelles is a Professional Spanish rugby union team based in Valencia, Spain. They play in Spain's top tier of rugby, the División de Honor

The club was founded in 1971 by Halangode Noel, a teacher at the Jesuit School of Valencia. Having been inspired by the London Wasps, he tried to transfer the name and spirit to a group of young students.

The club's name is the Valencian, not Spanish, translation of Bees, something which would have been rather a controversial thing during the dictatorship of Francisco Franco.

Noel also intended for the club to wear Wasps' distinctive colours, but in the 1970s another Valencian club, Tatami, already wore a similar kit, and so for many years Abelles played in orange. Today, the team's colours do resemble those of the English club.

Since its foundation, the club has played at both regional and national levels. In the last twenty years the club has spent more than half its seasons in División de Honor B, with occasional relegations and promotions.

In 2020, after Bathco Independiente Rugby Club announced they were unable to compete in Spain's top-flight División de Honor, Abelles gained promotion. This marked the club's third season in the division, after 2008-09 and 2009-10. Les Abelles has played in that division ever since.

== International honours ==
- (Spain) Fernando Dominguez
- (Spain) Marcos Poggi
- (Spain) Lucas Martín Poggi
