= UE Santboiana =

Spanish rugby union club, based in Sant Boi de Llobregat, Catalonia

Santboiana
- Full name: Unió Esportiva Santboiana
- Founded: 1921; 105 years ago
- Location: Sant Boi de Llobregat, Spain
- Ground: Estadi Baldiri Aleu (Capacity: 3,500)
- Chairman: Aurora Bravo
- Coach: Sergi Guerrero
- League: División de Honor
- 2023–24: División de Honor, 6th
1st kit	2nd kit

Official website
- www.uesantboiana.com

Unió Esportiva Santboiana is a professional Spanish rugby union club. The club was established in 1921 and currently competes in the División de Honor de Rugby competition, the highest level of Spanish club rugby. The club are based in Sant Boi de Llobregat in Catalonia, considered to be one of the capitals of Spanish rugby. Santboiana play in blue and white colours. The team have in the past won both the Spanish League and the Copa del Rey de Rugby as well as the Copa de Catalunya and Copa Ibèrica. They were champions of Spain in the 2005–06 season.

Santboiana are the former club of Sant Boi de Llobregat native Oriol Ripol, who is among Spain's most successful rugby players. He played professionally for Sale Sharks, in England's Guinness Premiership.

== Honours ==
- División de Honor: 8
  - Champions: 1983–84, 1986–87, 1988–89, 1995–96, 1996–97, 2004–05, 2005–06, 2021-22
- Copa del Rey: 12
  - Champions: 1931, 1933, 1943, 1948, 1958, 1959, 1960, 1961, 1962, 1989, 2000, 2017
- Copa Ibérica: 4
  - Champions: 1987, 1989, 2005, 2006
- Copa Pirineos: 2
  - Champions: 1960, 1961
- Copa de Catalunya: 17
  - Champions: 1923, 1931, 1933, 1934, 1935, 1943, 1944, 1945, 1956, 1959, 1995, 1996, 1997, 1998, 1999, 2000, 2005

== Season by season ==
Season	Tier	Division	Pos.	Notes
1952–53	1	División de Honor	3rd	
1953–54		DNP		
1954–70		DNH		
1970–71	1	División de Honor	4th	
1971–72	1	División de Honor	3rd	
1972–73	1	División de Honor	5th	
1973–74	1	División de Honor	7th	
1974–75	1	División de Honor	6th	
1975–76	1	División de Honor	5th	
1976–77	1	División de Honor	6th	
1977–78	1	División de Honor	7th	
1978–79	1	División de Honor	2nd	
1979–80	1	División de Honor	2nd	
1980–81	1	División de Honor	3rd	
1981–82	1	División de Honor	2nd	
1982–83	1	División de Honor	3rd	
1983–84	1	División de Honor	1st	League champion
1984–85	1	División de Honor	7th	
1985–86	1	División de Honor	2nd	
1986–87	1	División de Honor	1st	League champion
1987–88	1	División de Honor	2nd	
1988–89	1	División de Honor	1st	League/Cup champion
1989–90	1	División de Honor	5th	
1990–91	1	División de Honor	5th	
1991–92	1	División de Honor	2nd	
1992–93	1	División de Honor	5th	
1993–94	1	División de Honor	6th	
1994–95	1	División de Honor	5th	
1995–96	1	División de Honor	1st	League champion
1996–97	1	División de Honor	1st	League champion
1997–98	1	División de Honor	2nd	
1998–99	1	División de Honor	2nd	
1999–00	1	División de Honor	3rd	Cup champion

Season	Tier	Division	Pos.	Notes
2000–01	1	División de Honor	8th	
2001–02	1	División de Honor	4th	
2002–03	1	División de Honor	5th	
2003–04	1	División de Honor	4th	
2004–05	1	División de Honor	1st	League champion
2005–06	1	División de Honor	1st	League champion
2006–07	1	División de Honor	3rd	
2007–08	1	División de Honor	8th	
2008–09	1	División de Honor	5th	
2009–10	1	División de Honor	6th	
2010–11	1	División de Honor	7th	
2011–12	1	División de Honor	3rd / SF	League champion
2012–13	1	División de Honor	2nd / F	
2013–14	1	División de Honor	8th	
2014–15	1	División de Honor	2nd / F	
2015–16	1	División de Honor	4th / QF	
2016–17	1	División de Honor	4th	Cup champion
2017–18	1	División de Honor	6th	
2018–19	1	División de Honor	7th	
2019–20	1	División de Honor	5th	
2020–21	1	División de Honor	9th	
2021–22	1	División de Honor	2nd / F	League champion
2022–23	1	División de Honor	4th	
2023–24	1	División de Honor	6th	
2024–25	1	División de Honor	-	

- 55 seasons in División de Honor

=== International honours ===
- (Spain) Víctor Acevedo
- (Spain) Sergi Guerrero
- (Spain) Marc Puigbert
- (Spain) Víctor Marlet
- (Portugal) Juan Severino
- (Uruguay) Mario Sagario
- (Chile) Pablo Llorens
- (Venezuela) Víctor Gallego
- (Spain) Vicenç Lazaro
- (Spain) Leonardo Pereira
- (Spain) Jonathan Phipps

=== Other notable players ===
- Grant Polson (former player from Otago and Manawatu in Air New Zealand NPC)
- Isaac Thompson (signs from Manawatu in Air New Zealand NPC)
- Juan Pablo Socino (international Argentina U20)
- (New Zealand) Isaac Richmond (international with English Counties)
- Pablo Llorens (international with Chile)
- (New Zealand) Doug Tietjens (Former player from Otago and Manawatu in ITM CUP)
- (France) Arnaud Astruc (Former player from USAP ESPOIR)

== Ground ==
UE Santboiana plays its home matches at Estadi Baldiri Aleu, which has a capacity of 4,000 spectators.

== See also ==
- Rugby union in Spain
