= Estadi Baldiri Aleu =

UE Sanboiana rugby team stadium

Baldiri Aleu
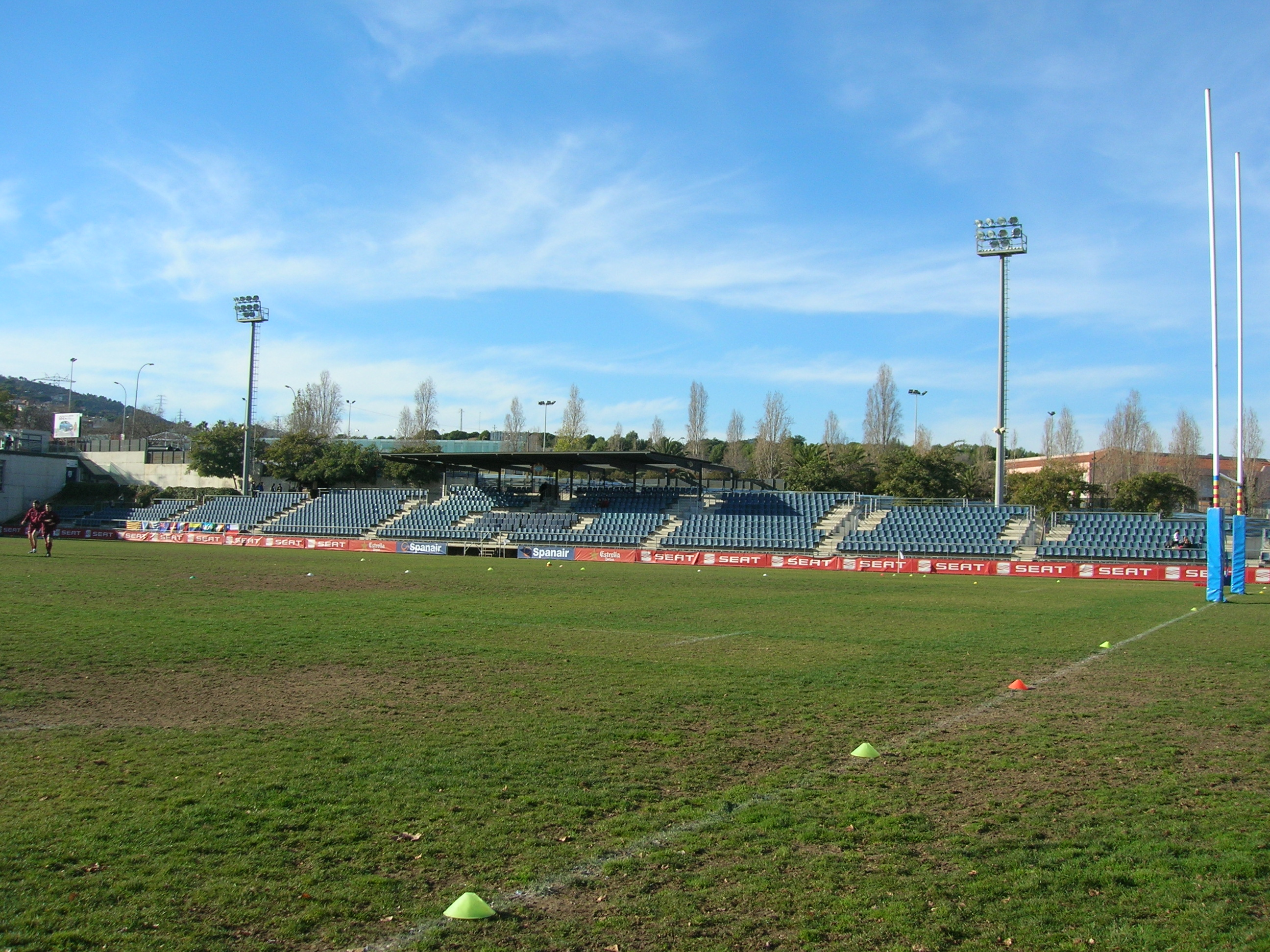
- Interactive map of Baldiri Aleu
- Location: Sant Boi de Llobregat, Catalonia, Spain
- Coordinates: 41°20′25″N 2°02′17.54″E
- Owner: Sant Boi city hall
- Capacity: 4,000
- Surface: natural grass

Construction
- Opened: February 19, 1950.

Tenant
- UE Santboiana

Estadi Baldiri Aleu is a rugby union stadium in Sant Boi de Llobregat, Barcelona Province, Catalonia, Spain. Its location lies between the Baldi Aleu and Cerdaña streets in Sant Boi de Llobregat. UE Santboiana plays there its home matches in División de Honor. The field is named after Baldiri Aleu Torres, UE Santboiana's first chairman, between 1921 and 1936 The field has capacity for 4000 spectators after its refurbishment in the 2000s.
