= Estadio Pepe Rojo =

Sports stadium in Valladolid, Spain

Coordinates: 41°39′35″N 4°40′23″W

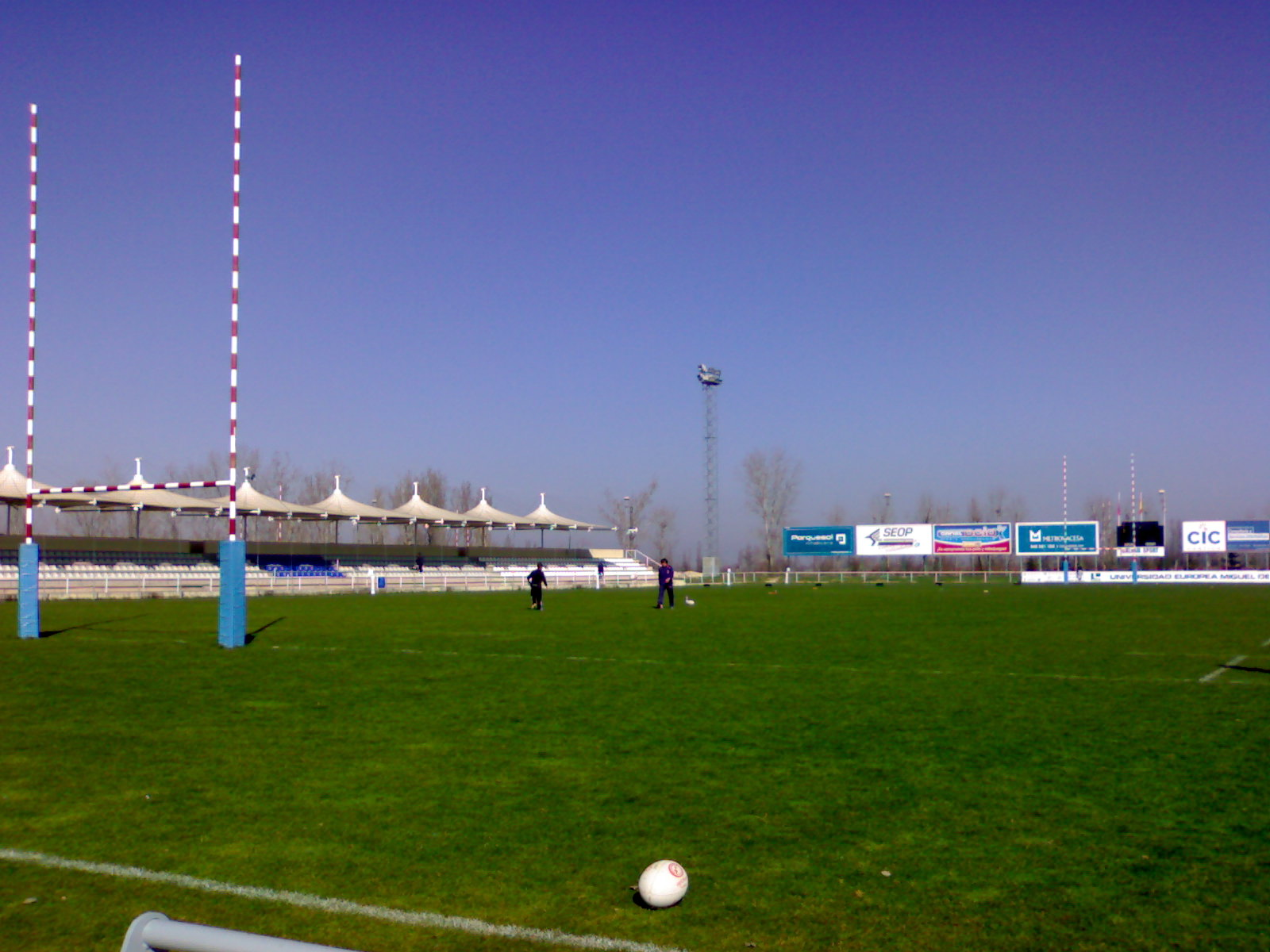
- Interactive map of Estadio Pepe Rojo
- Location: Valladolid, Spain
- Owner: Ayuntamiento de Valladolid
- Capacity: 5,000
- Surface: natural grass
- Field size: 128x69 and 120x70m

Construction
- Opened: 1981

Tenants
- CR El Salvador; Valladolid RAC

Estadio Pepe Rojo is a sports stadium located in the city of Valladolid, Spain. It is the home ground of CR El Salvador and Valladolid RAC leading clubs of the División de Honor, the top-level of Spanish rugby. The stadium is named after José Rojo Giralda, the president of the Valladolid Rugby Federation in the 1960s.

== Facilities ==
The sports complex consists of five rugby fields (Field no.1 - main field; Field no.2; field no.3 - 'track and field'; field no.4 and field no. 5, - 'artificial grass' ), of which the no. 1 y no. 2 are used regularly for first-grade official competitions (División de Honor, División de Honor B, Copa del Rey...). Two of the most important rugby clubs of Valladolid play at the field: CR El Salvador and Valladolid RAC.

The No. 1 field, which is the main field of the complex, has a roofed grandstand with seats at the west end, as well as a unroofed stand at the east end, with also a small stand at the north end, with the west stand being refurbished and expanded and the south end was built in 2016 (the stadium records big attendances when both teams play the local derby or a championship final). With this refurbishment it was possible to expand the capacity of Pepe Rojo to 1.150 seats, thus, reaching the amount of 6.000 seats in the No.1 field.

At the main field are played the División de Honor de Rugby, Copa del Rey de Rugby, Copa Ibérica de Rugby and European Challenge Cup matches. In 2009, it was the home stadium of the matches where the local franchise, the Vacceos Cavaliers played in Liga Superibérica.

The Spanish national team have also played matches at the stadium. The last match, played on 5 June 2010, against Japan.
