= Ion Insausti =

- Born: Ion Insausti Jiménez; 27 April 1984 (age 42) Hernani, Gipuzkoa, Spain
- Height: 180 cm (5 ft 11 in)
- Weight: 110 kg (243 lb; 17 st 5 lb)

Rugby union career
- Position: Prop
Senior career
Years	Team	Apps	(Points)
2005-2008	CR El Salvador		
2008-2010	CRC Pozuelo		
2009	Gatos de Madrid		
2010-2013	Saint-Jean-de-Luz Olympique		
2012-2018	Hernani CRE		
International career
Years	Team	Apps	(Points)
2005-2016	Spain	35	(5)

Ion Insausti Jiménez (born in Hernani, 27 Abril 1984) is a Spanish former rugby union player and coach. He played as prop and was an international for Spain, for which he earned 33 caps.

== Career ==
=== Club ===
He started his career at grassroots level for Hernani CRE, the team of his hometown. In 2005 he went to Valladolid for his studies and started to play for Club de Rugby El Salvador, where he won three Liga de División de Honor titles and two Copa del Rey titles. Later, he signed fo CRC Madrid, with which won the league and the cup in 2009. He also won Liga Superibérica's only season for Gatos de Madrid.

In 2010 he moved to San-Jean-de-Luz, to play for Saint-Jean-de-Luz Olympique in Fédérale 1 in France for three sesaons. In 2013, he returned to his first club to strengthen Hernani CRE's first row and coach the forwards of the Gipuzkoa side, until he retired as player in 2018 to focus on his coaching duties.

=== International ===
He earned his first international cap for Spain on 5 November 2005, during a test match against Japan where Spain lost 44–29. After this match, he became one of the starting props of the Spain national team.

During his career, he played 33 matches for Spain, being also a starter in the match between the Barbarians and Spain, held on 23 May 2007 at the Estadio Manuel Martínez Valero in Elche.

== Honours ==
=== Club ===
- División de Honor: 2007 and 2008 (Club de Rugby El Salvador), 2009 (CRC Madrid)
- Liga Superibérica: 2009 (Gatos de Madrid)
- Copa del Rey: 2006 and 2007 (Club de Rugby El Salvador), 2009 (CRC Madrid)
- Supercopa de España: 2007 and 2008 (Club de Rugby El Salvador), 2009 (CRC Madrid)
