= David Mota =

Spain international rugby union & league player

Personal information
- Born: David Mota Sierra; October 13, 1985 (age 41) Madrid
- Height: 1.81 m (5 ft 11 in)
- Weight: 88 kg (13 st 12 lb)

Playing information
Club
Years	Team	Pld	T	G	FG	P
2006	Crusaders

Rugby union career
- Position: Centre
- Current team: Complutense Cisneros
Senior career
Years	Team	Apps	(Points)
2009	Gatos de Madrid	3	(5)
2008-09	CRC Madrid		
- CR Liceo Francés
International career
Years	Team	Apps	(Points)
2004	Spain	25	(40)
National sevens team
Years	Team		Comps
- Spain 7s

David Mota (born 13 October 1985) is a Spanish rugby union player for Complutense Cisneros. Formerly he was a player of rugby league for the Crusaders for the CRC Madrid and for the CR Liceo Francés. His position of choice is at centre/wing.

He also played for Gatos de Madrid, one of the franchises of the competition called Superibérica de Rugby.

He has played for the Spain national rugby union team since 20 November 2004 when he has made his début against Hungary. Since then, he has played 25 games and has scored 40 points (8 tries). He also has played with Spain the European Nations Cup.

== Honours ==
CRC Madrid

- División de Honor de Rugby: 2008-09
- Copa del Rey de Rugby: 2008-09

Gatos de Madrid

- Superibérica de Rugby: 2009
