= Antonio Machuca =

- Full name: Antonio Machuca Charro
- Born: May 13, 1959 Madrid, Spain
- Died: 18 September 2025 (aged 68)
- Height: 1.80 m (5 ft 11 in)
- Weight: 95 kg (209 lb)

Rugby union career
- Position: Prop
Senior career
Years	Team	Apps	(Points)
1980-1988	CD Arquitectura		
International career
Years	Team	Apps	(Points)
1980-1984	Spain	25	(0)

Antonio Machuca Charro (13 May 1959 – 18 September 2025), better known as Antonio Machuca or by his nickname "Tete" Machuca, was a Spanish rugby union player who played as a prop. He was widely regarded as one of the most prominent forwards in the history of CD Arquitectura, with whom he won multiple national titles, and was a key member of the Spain national rugby union team during the 1980s.

== Club career ==
Machuca developed his entire top-level career playing for CD Arquitectura in Madrid, one of the most successful clubs in Spanish rugby history. As a solid and fierce prop, he became team captain and anchored the team's scrum during their golden era in the 1980s. During his tenure, he helped the club win four División de Honor de Rugby league titles (1981, 1982, 1986, and 1988) and four Copa del Rey de Rugby titles (1980, 1981, 1984, and 1988). After his retirement as player, he became coach of his former club, Arquitectura, leading the club to its last División de Honor de Rugby title in the 1995.

== International career ==
Machuca was a cornerstone for the Spain national team throughout the 1980s. He earned over 25 official caps for his country, meaning his name is recorded in the federation's historic honours list.

He regularly featured as a starting prop in the FIRA Trophy (European Championship) tournaments against international powerhouses like Italy and France, as well as high-profile exhibition test matches. His international debut for Spain was during a test match against Poland in Madrid, on 16 November 1980. On 20 November 1982, he started as the number 1 prop in the historic match against the Māori All Blacks at the Estadio Nacional Complutense in Madrid.

== Death ==
On 18 September 2025, Machuca died at the age of. 66
