= Atlético Madrid (disambiguation) =

Atlético Madrid or full name Club Atlético de Madrid, S.A.D. (meaning "Athletic Club of Madrid"), commonly referred to as Atlético de Madrid in English or simply as Atlético, Atléti, is a Spanish professional football club based in Madrid, that play in La Liga.

Atletico Madrid may also refer to:

- Atlético Madrid B, Spanish football team based in Madrid, in the community of Madrid, founded 1963, the reserve team of Atlético Madrid and currently plays in Segunda División B – Group 1with home games at Cerro del Espino Stadium
- Atlético Madrid C, earlier Spanish football club that played in the Tercera División and played their home games at the Nuevo Cerro del Espino
- Atletico Madrid Balonmano, or BM Neptuno, or merger of Club Balonmano Neptuno/Atlético Madrid, earlier Spanish handball team based in Madrid, Spain (2011 to 2013)
- Atlético Madrid BM, earlier Spanish handball team that was part of the Atlético sports organization (1951 to 1994)
- Atlético Madrid Femenino, Spanish women's football team based in Madrid
- Atlético Madrid Rugby, Spanish rugby union section of the Spanish club Atlético Madrid. Established in 1914
- Atlético Madrid (youth), or Atlético de Madrid Juvenil, the under-19 team of Spanish professional football club Atlético Madrid
