= Atlético Madrid Rugby =

Spanish rugby union club, based in Madrid

Atlético Madrid
- Full name: Club Atlético Madrid
- Union: Spanish Rugby Federation
- Nickname(s): Colchoneros, Rojiblancos
- Founded: 1914 (disestablished 2014; 12 years ago)
- Ground(s): Gabriel Parellada, Tres Cantos (Capacity: 1,500)
- League: Copa del Rey
- 2014: Quarterfinals
Team kit

Atlético Madrid Rugby was the rugby union section of Spanish club Atlético Madrid. Established in 1914, the squad achieved several regional and national titles before the section was closed in 2014.

== History ==
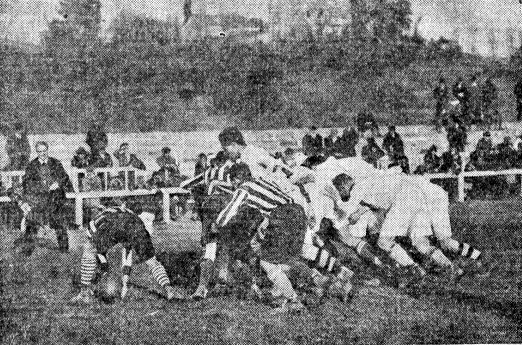
Atlético playing Real Madrid, the first time both teams played each other, January 1925

Atlético Madrid was the rival of Real Madrid in the debut of Merengues in rugby union, on 10 January 1925 in the Stadium Metropolitano, Atlético lost to Real Madrid by 27–0.

The squad won the "Copa de Navidad" (Christmas Cup) in 1948, defeating Facultad de Medicina and Arquitectura among others. In 1949 Atlético defeated Arquitectura by 9–6, qualifying for the Spain national championship. In May 1949, the squad beat Facultad de Derecho de Madrid by 6–0, reaching the national championship final. On 15 May 1949, Atlético defeated UE Santboiana by 83, crowning national champion for the first time. The line-up for that match was R. Duralte, L. Bravo, Alarcón, Peña, Arce, Feliciano, Jose Luis San Juan, Moret, Artola, Puche, F. Duralde, Roberto, De Miguel, Cubillo, E. Bravo.

In October 1957, Atlético Madrid merged to CD Arquitectura. Player Javier Barroso was the Arquitectura captain and also president of Atlético. The team competed as "Arquitectura" in the University championships and as "Atlético" in the Castilla championships. In Summer 1959, the Atlético Madrid executives decided to close the section.

In 2012 Atlético Madrid made a deal with CRC Pozuelo to have a rugby team in the División de Honor, the main club competition of Spanish rugby. The CRC squad agreed to use the name, shield and colors of Atlético Madrid during the time the agreement was in force.

In its debut season, the squad reached the playoffs after finishing 6th. Atlético was finally eliminated by UE Santboiana by 28–17.

In August 2014 the Grupo Santa Mónica withdrew the sponsorship although the agreement ended in 2015. Therefore, the rugby section of Atlético Madrid was discontinued.

== Titles ==
- Copa del Rey (1): 1949
- Campeonato de Castilla (5): 1923, 1927, 1928, 1952, 1954

== See also ==
- CRC Madrid
- Rugby union in Spain
