= Campo de Rugby Valle de las Cañas =

Rugby union stadium in Pozuelo de Alarcón, Madrid, Spain

Valle de las Cañas
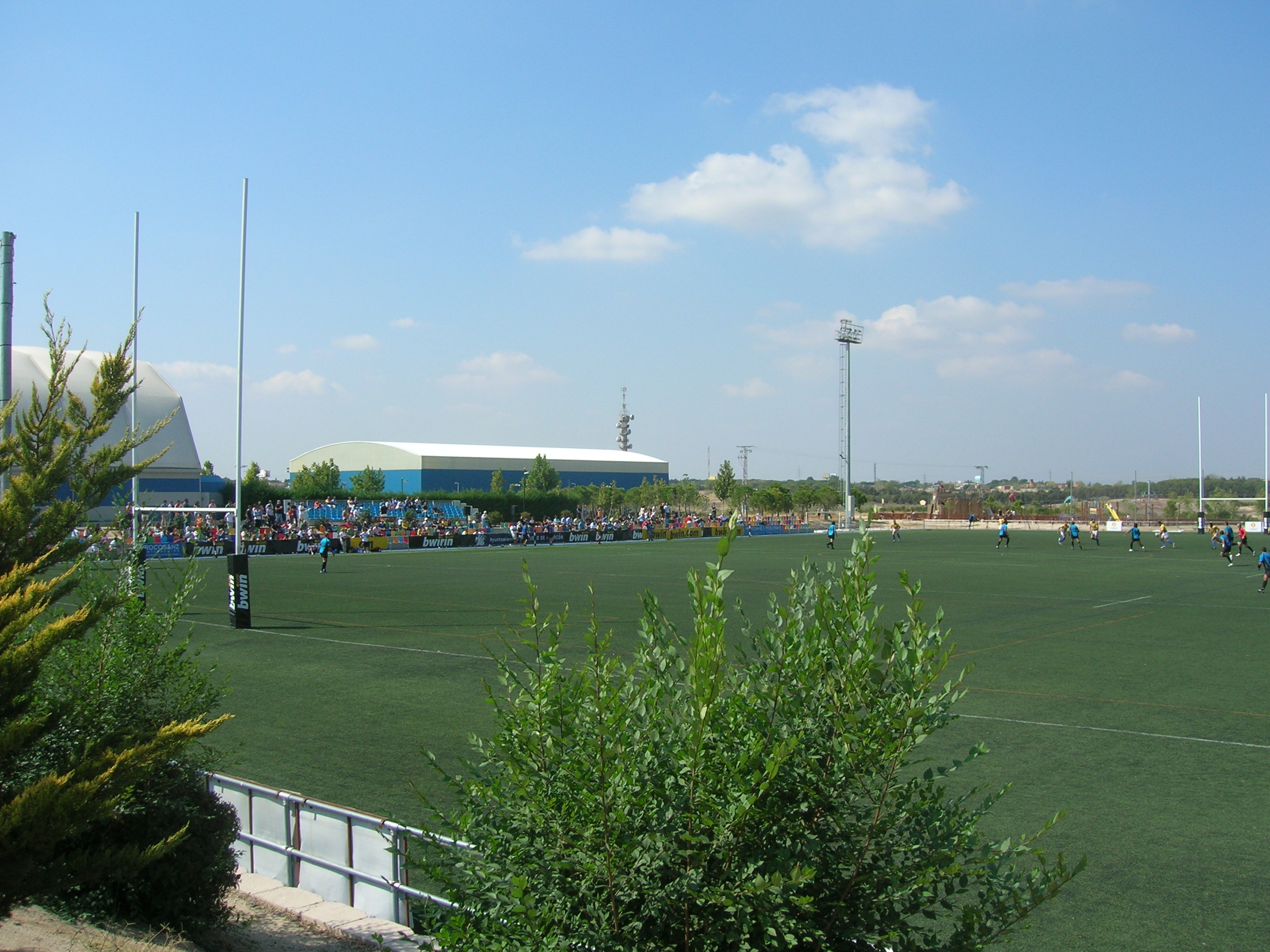
- Interactive map of Valle de las Cañas
- Location: Pozuelo de Alarcón, Community of Madrid, Spain
- Coordinates: 43°28′11″N 3°51′6″W
- Owner: Ayuntamiento de Pozuelo de Alarcón
- Operator: Ayuntamiento de Pozuelo de Alarcón
- Capacity: 500
- Surface: Artificial grass

Construction
- Opened: 2000

Tenants
- CRC Pozuelo; Olímpico RC

Campo de Rugby Valle de las Cañas, known also as Valle de las Cañas is a rugby stadium located in the town of Pozuelo de Alarcón, Spain. It is a natural grass field opened in 2000 and holds about 500 people.

The facilities are used by CRC Pozuelo plays for playing rugby in División de Honor, as well by Olímpico RC. The field was also the home stadium of Gatos de Madrid during the Liga Superibérica first edition in 2009.

== The sports complex ==
Valle de las Cañas, is a sports complex inaugurated in 2010 by the Pozuelo de Alarcón city hall. Currently, the facilities are owned by the private capital company Grand Slam 5 S.L. of which the former tennis player José López-Maeso is part. During its inaugural year, it hosted the sports trainings of Real Madrid Baloncesto. As of currently, the multi-purpose building is dedicated to offer sports services to the Community of Madrid.

== Location ==
Located in the II district of Pozuelo de Alarcón, the Valle de las Cañas sports complex is situated between the Europe's biggest multi-purpose facilities with more than 200.000 square meters of extension and 17.000 square meters dedicated to the main building, where the Fitness Sports Valle de las Cañas sports pavilion.

== See also ==
- CRC Pozuelo
- División de Honor de Rugby
- Liga Superibérica
