= Jayden Keelan =

New Zealand rugby union player

- Full name: Jayden William Keelan
- Born: Perth Rockingham, Western Australia
- Height: 178 cm (5 ft 10 in)
- Weight: 85 kg (187 lb)
- School: Palmerston North Boys' High School

Rugby union career
- Position(s): Fullback, First five-eighth
Senior career
Years	Team	Apps	(Points)
2023	Fénix CR Zaragoza		
2023–	College Old Boys		
National sevens team
Years	Team		Comps
2024–	New Zealand		

Jayden Keelan is a New Zealand rugby union player. He is a New Zealand sevens international.

== Early life ==
Keelan was born in Tolaga Bay, New Zealand. His father, William, was a Lieutenant Colonel in the New Zealand army, and they lived in Malaysia and Fiji and Keelan attended numerous different schools” before boarding at Palmerston North Boys' High School. In 2019, he was a member of the Palmerston first-XV rugby union team that was ranked in the top eight in New Zealand, with his teammates including Ruben Love.

== Club career ==
Keelan played club rugby for Fénix CR Zaragoza in Spain in 2022-2023 before later playing in 2023 in Manawatu, New Zealand, for College Old Boys. At College Old Boys he became a teammate of New Zealand Sevens coach Tomasi Cama.

== International career ==
Tomasi Cama called him up for his debut in the New Zealand national rugby sevens team in February 2024. He made his debut in Los Angeles at the USA Sevens in 2024. He played in the 2024-25 SVNS series but a hamstring injury ruled him out of action for part of the season. He continued with New Zealand Sevens for the 2025-26 season. His performances including two tries against hosts Spain at the 2026 Spain Sevens in Valladolid in May 2026. The following month, he also scored a brace in the semi-final and was a try scorer again in the final against home team France at the 2026 France Sevens in Bordeaux.
