= Campo de Rugby Las Terrazas =

Rugby union stadium in Madrid, Spain

Las Terrazas
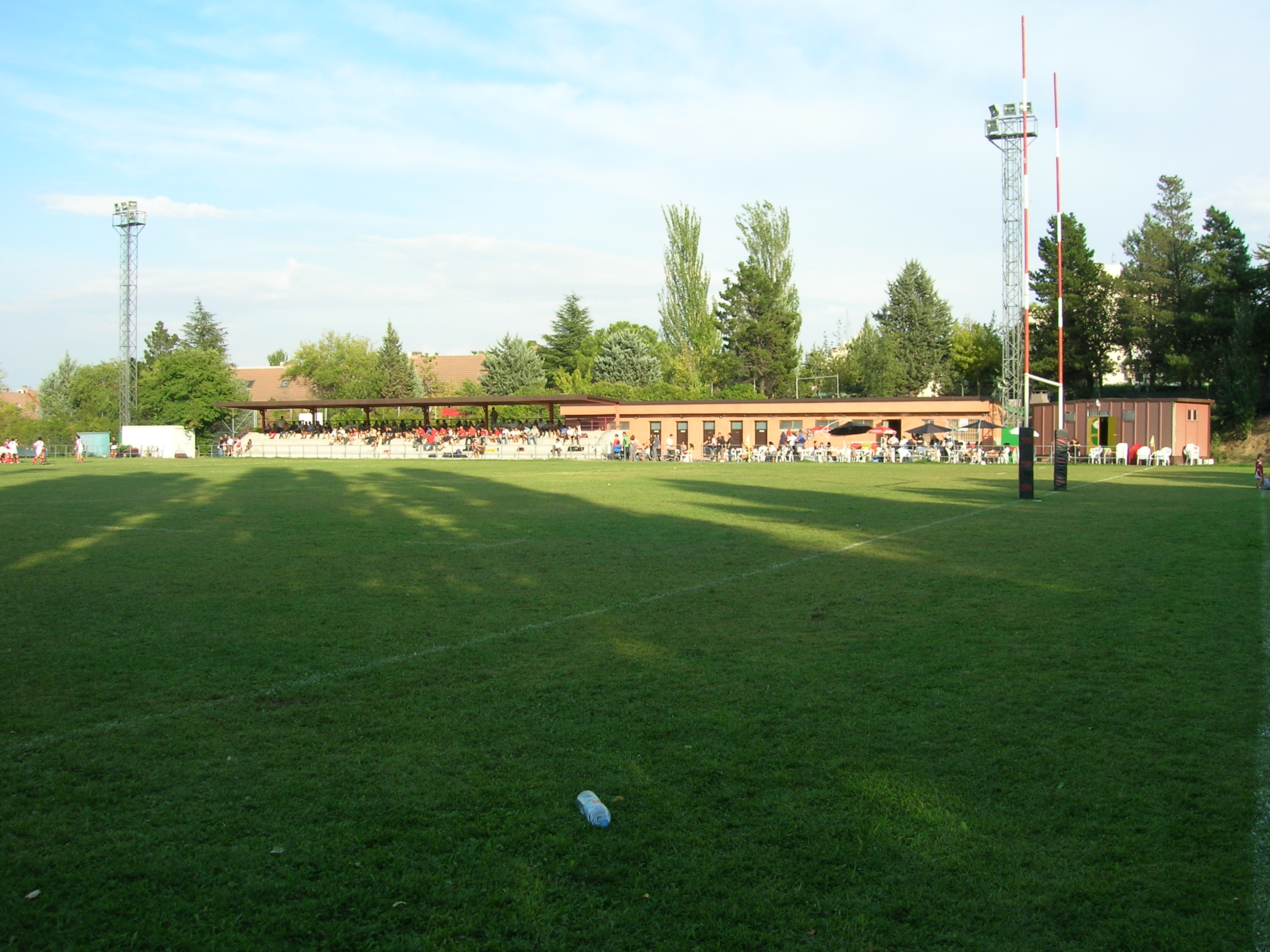
- Interactive map of Las Terrazas
- Location: Alcobendas, Community of Madrid, Spain
- Coordinates: 40°31′46″N 3°38′15″W
- Owner: Alcobendas city hall
- Capacity: 2000
- Surface: artificial turf

Construction
- Opened: 1998
- Renovated: 2018

Tenants
- Alcobendas Rugby; Gatos de Madrid

Website
- www.alcobendasrugby.com

Campo de Rugby Las Terrazas is a Spanish rugby union stadium in southwest Alcobendas, Madrid. It is the home ground of the local team, Alcobendas Rugby, which plays in the División de Honor league, and was home to the now defunct club Moraleja Alcobendas Rugby Union. In 2009, during the Liga Superibérica season, it was one of the home fields of the Madrid-based rugby franchise Gatos de Madrid. The stadium also hosted the 2021–22 División de Honor de Rugby final between Alcobendas Rugby and VRAC Quesos Entrepinares, as well as the 2022 Rugby Europe Women's Championship match between Spain and Russia.

== Facilities ==
The facilities consist of a rugby field with natural grass, a covered grandstand, changing rooms for home and away teams and referees, and two small sports equipment storage areas. Additionally, the club's bar is open on match days, and is also responsible for preparing the popular after-match parties.

There has been speculation about the possibility of the facilities being demolished to build an underground parking lot that would decongest the area, which lacks parking zones. However, this plan seems to have been rejected temporarily by the Alcobendas city hall.

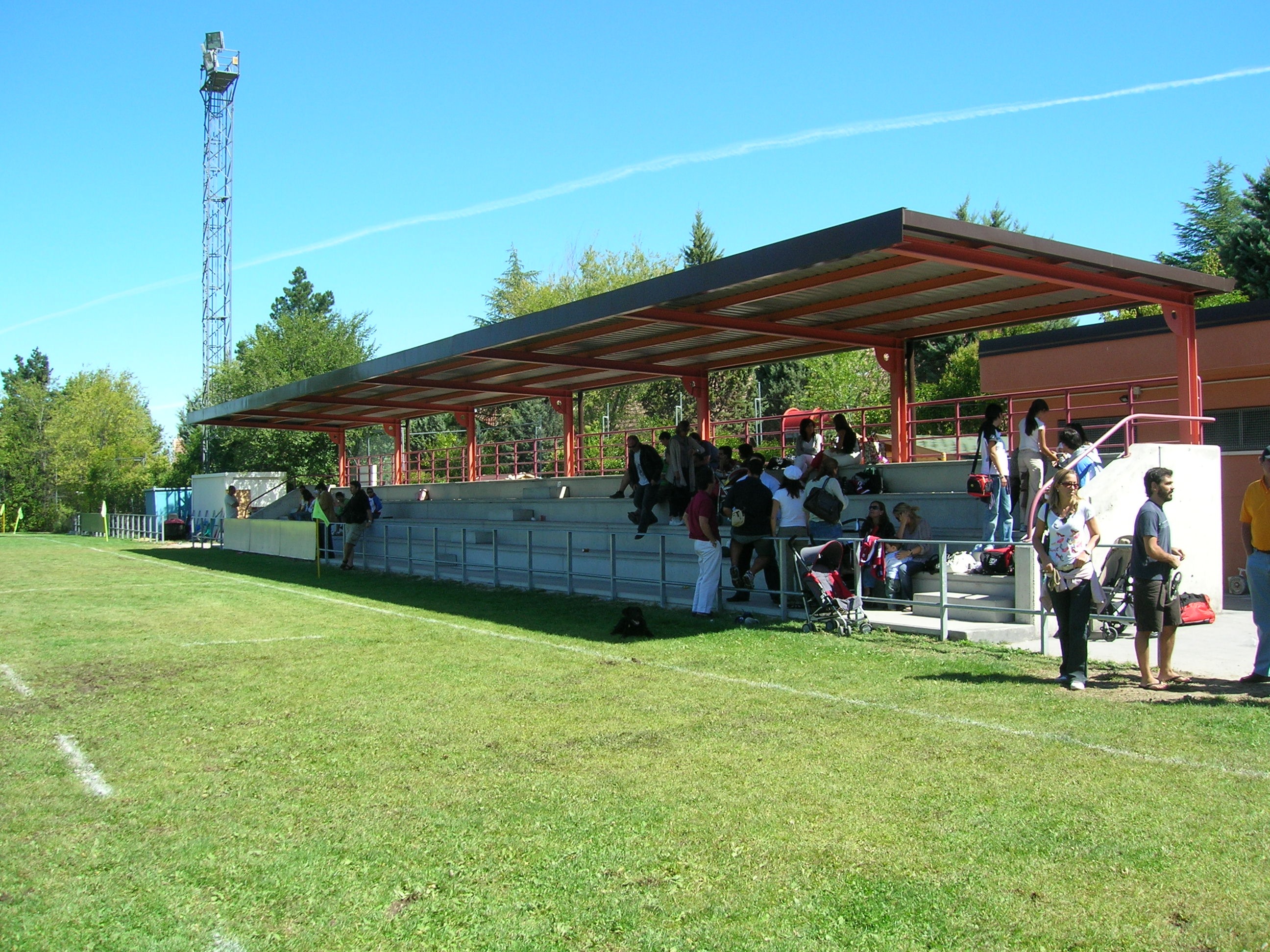
The main stand

== Renovations ==
In 2018 the stadium had several important renovations including the installation of artificial grass, an increase in the width and length of the field to bring it into compliance with official international measurements, as well the construction of a new perimeter zone, new seats, and new floodlight towers. The stadium's roof was completely replaced in 2021 due to sustaining damage during the storm Filomena.

== See also ==
- Club Alcobendas Rugby
- División de Honor
- División de Honor B
- Liga Superibérica
