= Rugby union in Spain =

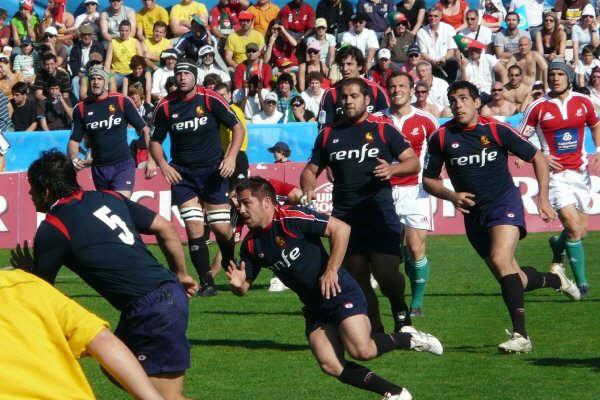
- Spain (in blue kit) playing Portugal in March 2009
- Governing body: Spanish Rugby Federation
- First played: 1901; 125 years ago
- Registered players: 37,241
- Clubs: 332

National competitions
- International competitions: Rugby World Cup; European Nations Cup; Rugby World Cup Sevens; IRB Sevens World Series

Club competitions
- Domestic and European club competitions: División de Honor; División de Honor B; División de Honor Élite; Copa Ibérica de Rugby; Copa del Rey de Rugby; Supercopa de España de Rugby; European Challenge Cup; European Shield

Rugby union in Spain is a team sport growing in popularity. As of 2019, there were 37,241 registered rugby union players in Spain, playing for 332 clubs in various divisions. The sport's governing body in Spain, the Spanish Rugby Federation (Spanish: Federación Española de Rugby), was founded in 1923. It joined the International Rugby Board in 1988, and is also a member of Rugby Europe.

There are traditionally four main rugby playing regions in Spain: the capital Madrid, the city of Valladolid in the Old Castile region, the entire regions of Basque Country, and Catalonia, particularly in the north and also around Barcelona. Rugby has been emerging recently in Valencia and Andalucia as well, with clubs like Marbella or CAU Valencia providing several players to the national team.

The Spanish national team plays in the Rugby Europe Championship, a competition for second tier European rugby nations such as Georgia, Romania and Russia. As of July 2025, Spain is ranked 15th in the world, and played at the 1999 Rugby World Cup. The national sevens team is now one of the 15 "core teams" that participate in each event of the annual World Rugby Sevens Series, having earned that status at the 2017 Hong Kong Sevens. Both men and women rugby sevens national teams qualified for the 2016 Olympic Games.

== History ==
Rugby was first introduced into Spain before World War I. However, subsequent events such as the Spanish Civil War hindered its development.

=== Early history ===
The earliest recorded game in Spain was in 1901, when an Englishman, Stuart Nicholson, resident in Bilbao,

"turned to Racing Club, when he wanted eye catching opposition for a three team tournament, also involving British and French exiles in Barcelona."

However, rugby lay largely dormant in the country until after the end of World War I, when rugby was reintroduced into Spain from the south of France, particularly Provence and the French Basque Country. In 1921, Baudilio Aleu Torres, a Catalan, who had been studying veterinary medicine in Toulouse, returned to his native Barcelona, and founded the Santboiana Club there. Santboiana's pitch was cleared by the players themselves, and according to Huw Richards, "a tree was tolerated and used as a coat hanger, until it was uprooted after a few games."

The Spanish Rugby Federation, the governing body for rugby union in Spain, was founded in 1923.

The first game in Madrid was in the 1920s as well, when Biarritz and Tarbes played an exhibition match in front of 12,000 spectators. The score upset some of the fans, who protested by throwing cushions onto the pitch.

A Spanish XV played France, including Yves du Manoir, in 1927, but it was organised by a rebel governing body, and so is not usually recognised as a proper international game.

Spain's first recognised international was in 1929, against Italy, in Barcelona, at Montjuïc Stadium, as part of the 1929 Expo. The Spanish royal family attended and all of the players were Catalan. Spain won 9–0.

=== Post-war period ===
In 1960, a French priest, Father George Bernés, introduced the game in Valladolid, Castile and León, leading to the creation of two of that region's clubs: Cetransa El Salvador and Valladolid RAC.

Spain's international record includes wins over Italy in 1977 and Romania in 1992 and 1994.

With the thawing of relations between the UK and Spain over the Gibraltar question, rugby union in Gibraltar has become more closely linked with its Spanish neighbours. When the border between Spain and Gibraltar reopened, after having been closed between 1968 and 1985, a number of games were played against sides from Seville and Madrid. Campo Gibraltar RFC now play in the Andalucian second division.

In 1989, the Spanish women's team played their first match, against France, losing 0-28. In 2000, they joined the Women's Six Nations, but in 2007, the tournament was altered so that Italy replaced Spain, in order to mirror the men's tournament.

=== Modern Day ===
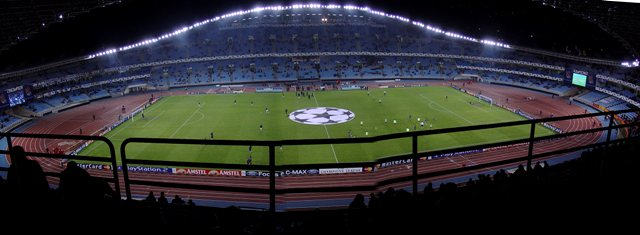
Estadio Anoeta before redevelopment in May 2017.

In more recent times, thanks to the influx of expatriates, a fifth "region" has opened up along the beach resorts on the Mediterranean coast, the Canary Islands and Balearics. In these areas, however, local people rarely participate, the exception being the Marbella Rugby club on the Costa Del Sol, whose members are an equal mix of expatriates from the UK, South America and locals. The success of this policy is displayed by the progress of their junior teams, recently reaching the final of the national club championships in 2010, thus giving them the title of second best side in the country in 2010 and then going on to win the club championship in May 2011, to become the best U16 club side in Spain. The Marbella players also make up the majority of the regional Andalucian team which participate at national level. A number of juniors from this region have been selected for regional as well as national teams. The Torrevieja rugby club on the Costa Blanca also has a similar composition of players. Beach rugby has become popular in many areas, as has rugby sevens. There are several rugby sevens tournaments in the country, including the Benidorm Sevens.

In recent years, Estadio Anoeta in the Basque Country has also been used for occasional Heineken Cup rugby union fixtures by nearby French-Basque club Biarritz Olympique (BO). In the 2009–10 Top 14 season, both Biarritz and fellow Basque club Bayonne will take one home match to the Anoeta. On 21 August, Bayonne will host Stade Français at the Anoeta, followed on 12 September by the Northern Basque derby between Biarritz and Bayonne, with BO as the home team. The stadium, which holds 32,076, was inaugurated in 1993.

Spain continues to be popular with touring sides from Britain, Ireland and France, due to its climate and good transport links.

In playing standard, Spain occupies the second tier in Europe, along with Romania and Georgia.

=== 2035 Rugby World Cup Bid ===
In October 2026, the Spanish Rugby Federation put forward a proposal to host the 2035 Rugby World Cup. Under the proposal, the final would be held at the Camp Nou in Barcelona and, if successful, it would be the first time the final is held in front of a crowd of more than 100,000 fans. The Santiago Bernabéu in Madrid and Mestalla Stadium in Valencia would also be in line host major fixtures.

The proposal also aims to triple the number of people playing the sport in the country by 2035 and, ultimately, establish Spain as a Tier One nation.

In the lead up to the 2035 tournament bidding process, the Federation announced they had also expressed interest in hosting the 2029 Champions Cup and Challenge Cup finals in Madrid and the 2030 Top14 in Barcelona. The European club tournaments had previously been hosted in San Mamés, Bilbao for both 2018 and 2016 campaigns, with the 2016 Top14 final having also been previously hosted at the Camp Nou. Juan Carlos Martin Sanchez, the President of the Federation, also revealed they had been in discussions with the United Rugby Championship to introduce a Spanish franchise, in addition to holding talks with EPCR about permitting a Spanish side in the Challenge Cup as soon as 2027.

In November 2026, with Qatar withdrawing from hosting rights to the 2028 Nations Championship final, the Spanish federation made an informal expression of interest to be named as the replacement hosts.

== Popularity ==
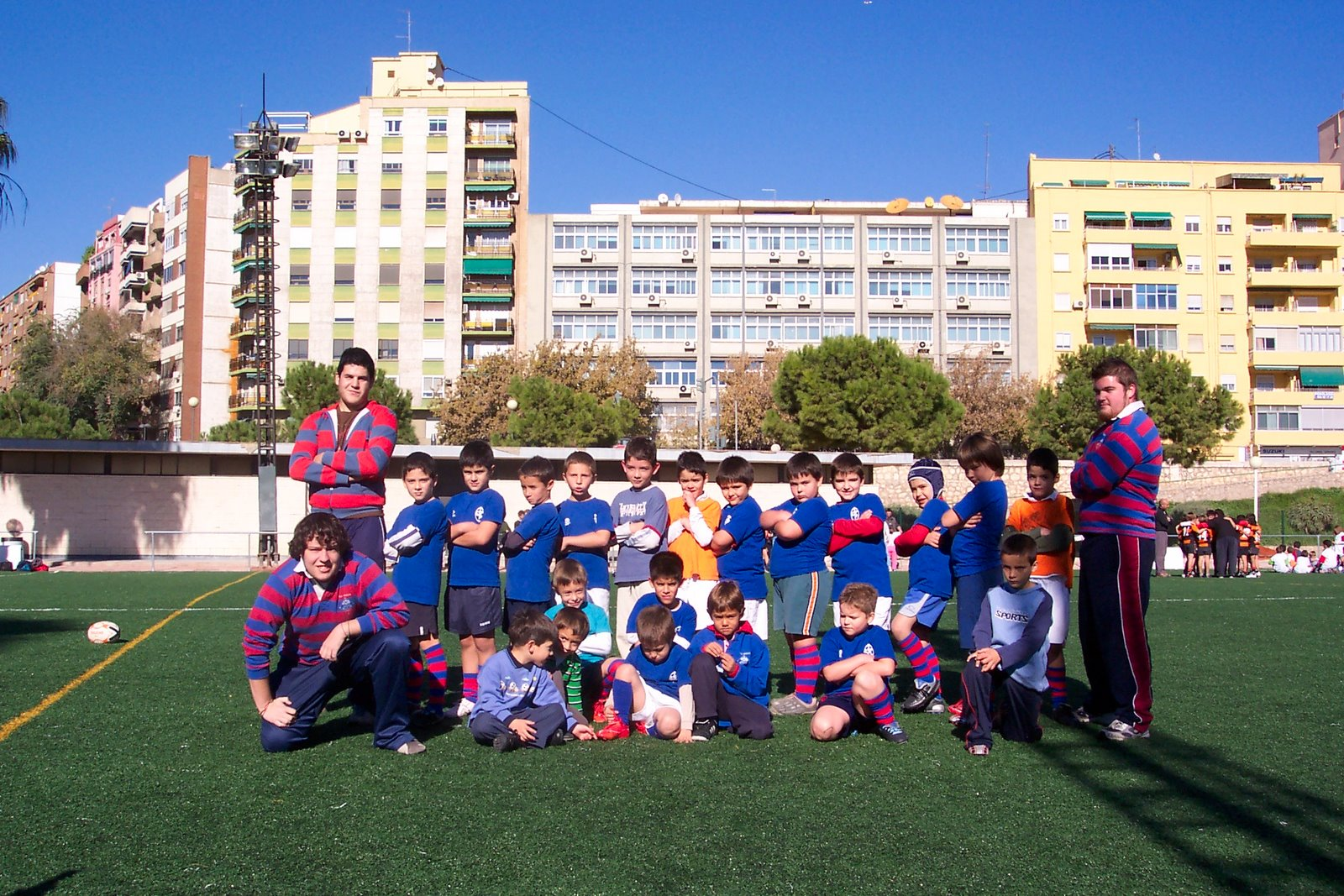
Under-8 players at Club de Rugby San Roque, November 2007

There are over 51,123 registered rugby union players in Spain, with more than 221 clubs across the country. Participation rates for rugby union jumped by 20% in the Madrid area during the two years following the national team's participation in their first ever Rugby World Cup in 1999. In addition, funding from the Spanish sports council has also been on the rise. Rugby union gets low media coverage, however, compared to more popular team sports such as association football and basketball.

There are pockets where rugby is particularly popular, such as the city of Valladolid in the Castile and León region, Sant Boi de Llobregat in Catalonia and Ordizia in the Basque country. The rugby club Biarritz Olympique, who come from the French Basque Country have played Heineken Cup matches at the 32,000-seat Estadio Anoeta in San Sebastián, Spain and attracted sell-out crowds.

On 4 November 2014, France's professional rugby union league announced that the 2015–16 Top 14 final would be held at the Camp Nou in Barcelona on 24 June 2016. The Top 14 final is traditionally held at the Stade de France in the Paris suburb of Saint-Denis. However, the scheduling of the 2015 Rugby World Cup will cause the 2015–16 French season to be shifted by several weeks, in turn causing the Stade de France to be unavailable because it will be a major venue for UEFA Euro 2016. Holding the event in Barcelona may potentially boost the sport's popularity in that area.

On 17 April 2016, in what is considered by many a milestone in the increasing popularity of rugby in Spain, a crowd of 26,500 attended to the Copa del Rey de Rugby final at Estadio Nuevo José Zorrilla in Valladolid. This was the 6th time that this stadium was sold out since its inauguration in 1982, including football matches. Tickets were sold out days before the match and prices rose in the Internet touting. King Felipe VI of Spain and prominent politicians like Spanish Socialist Workers' Party leader Pedro Sánchez and vice president Soraya Sáenz de Santamaría attended the match.

== National team ==
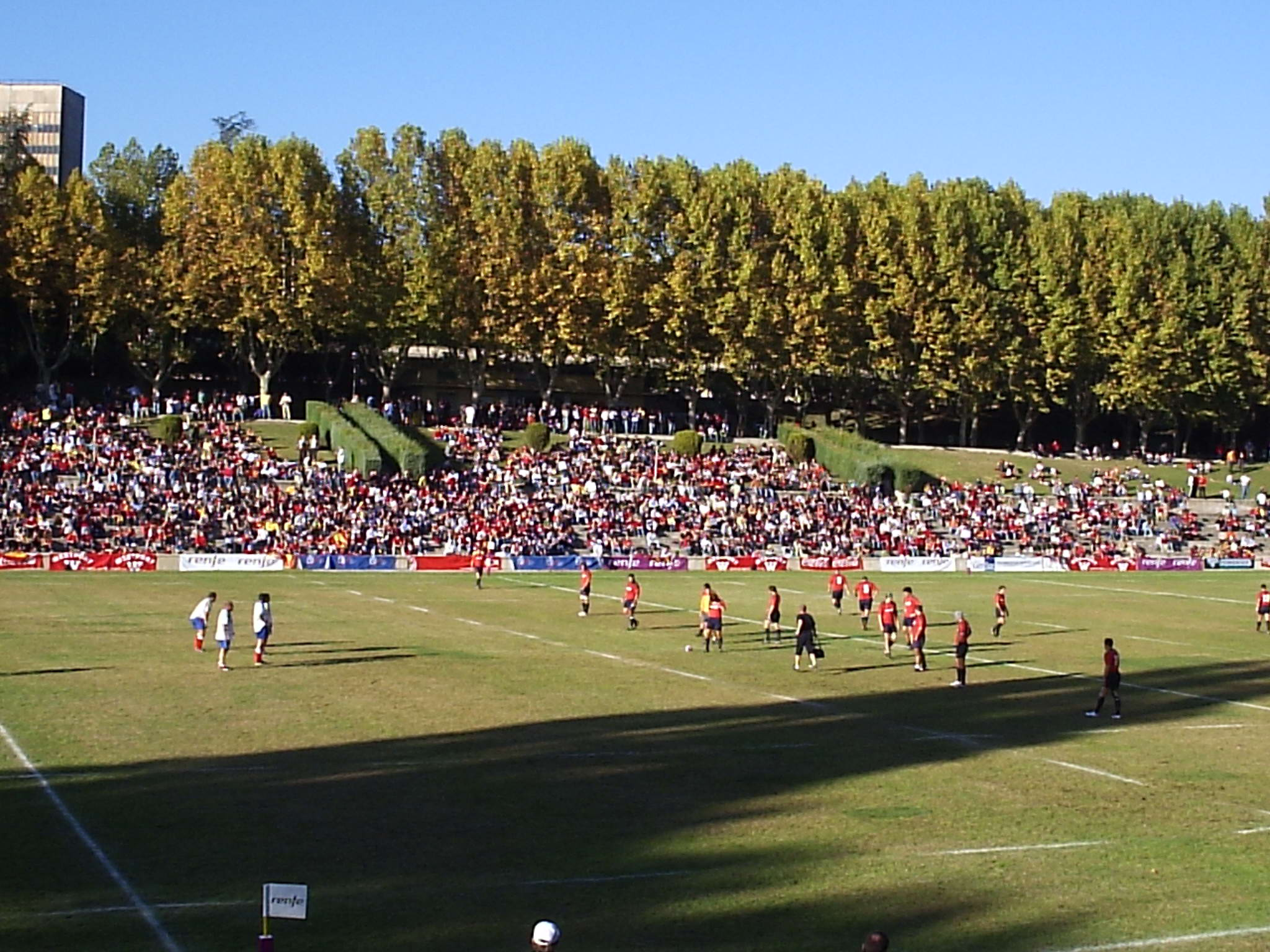
Spain playing the Czech Republic (2007)

The Spain national rugby union team represents the whole country and have been playing international rugby since the late 1920s. Their first match was in 1929 against Italy, which Spain won 9–0.

Spain has thus far made one Rugby World Cup appearance, in 1999. They were grouped in Pool A, alongside South Africa, Scotland and Uruguay. South Africa and Scotland defeated Spain by 40 points, and they also lost to Uruguay, though it was a closer contest.

== Competitions ==
The Spanish rugby union league is divided into divisions. The top teams play in the División de Honor. In each division, a team plays all other teams twice, once at home and once away. The Spanish league teams compete in a domestic cup competition each year, called the Copa del Rey. The winners of the División de Honor de Rugby (Honor Division) play the winners of the Copa del Rey in the Supercopa de España de Rugby (Super Cup). The champion of the División de Honor earns a spot in the Challenge Cup Qualifying Competition.

=== Divisions ===
- División de Honor (11 teams)
- División de Honor Élite (10 teams)
- División de Honor B (3 groups of 10 teams each)
- 12 Regional Leagues:
  - Andalusian Rugby League
  - Liga Norte de Rugby
  - Basque Country Rugby League

=== Other competitions ===
- Copa del Rey de Rugby
- Supercopa de España de Rugby

== Vocabulary ==
French rugby vocabulary has been a strong influence on that of Spain. There are, however, substantial differences between South American Spanish terms and those of Spain. In South America, a combination of Spanish and English position names is used, because rugby was introduced there directly from England after these countries became independent from Spain.

English	French	Italian	Spanish (Spain)	Spanish (South America)
Prop	Pilier	Pilone	Pilar, Pilier	Pilar
Hooker	Talonneur	Tallonatore	Talonador	Hooker
Lock (Second Row)	Deuxième Ligne	Seconda Linea	Segunda Línea	Segunda Línea
Flanker (Wing Forward)	Troisième Ligne Aile	Terza (linea) ala Flanker	Tercera Línea, Flanker	Tercera Línea, Ala
Number eight	Troisième Ligne Centre	Terza linea media Terza (linea) centro Numero 8	Tercera Línea Centro u "Ocho"	Octavo, Ocho, Tercera Línea
Scrum half	Demi de mêlée	Mediano di mischia	Medio melé	Medio Scrum
Fly-half (Stand-off)	Demi d'ouverture, Ouvreur	Apertura; Mediano d'apertura	Apertura, Medio de Apertura	Apertura, Medio Apertura
Centre	Centre	Centro (Primo e Secondo); Tre quarti centro	Centro (Primero y Segundo)	In-side (Primero y Segundo), Centro
Wing (Left and Right)	Ailier	Ala; Tre quarti ala	Ala (Izquierda y Derecha)	Wing (Izquierdo y Derecho)
Full-back	Arrière	Estremo	Zaguero	Fullback

== Notable players ==
The Oscar-winning actor Javier Bardem played for the under-16 and under-18 squads and briefly for the senior national team. Bardem was originally a flanker, but became a prop, and has been quoted as saying, "being a rugby player in Spain is akin to being a bullfighter in Japan."

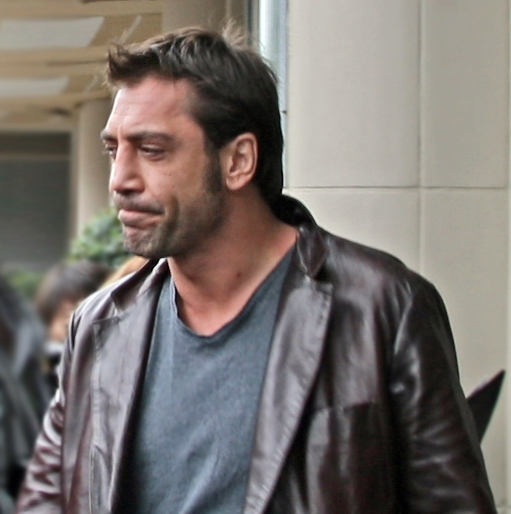
Oscar-winning actor Javier Bardem is one of the best-known Spanish rugby players

Other notable Spanish players include -

- Alberto Malo, played for Freyberg RC (Taranaki RFU) in New Zealand and one of the first Spanish players to make it big on the world stage.
- Joel Merkler, currently plays for Toulouse and is the first Spanish player ever to the European Rugby Champions Cup
- Gabriel Rivero
- Jon Azkargorta
- Jaime Gutiérrez
- Jon Etxeberria
- Javier Morote
- Raphaël Bastide, played professionally for Perpignan, Colomiers and, since 2004 for Auch.
- Alfonso Feijoo, had 22 caps for Spain during his career.
- David Mota, CRC Madrid, formerly a player of rugby league for the Crusaders
- Francisco Puertas Soto, capped 93 times by Spain from 1994 to 2001.
- Oriol Ripol, a wing for Sale Sharks in the Guinness Premiership, formerly with Northampton; first Spanish player in the Barbarians.
- Diego Zarzosa, CR El Salvador and Harlequins, second Spanish player in the Barbarians

== Bibliography ==
- Bath, Richard (ed.) The Complete Book of Rugby (Seven Oaks Ltd, 1997 ISBN 1-86200-013-1)
- Richards, Huw A Game for Hooligans: The History of Rugby Union (Mainstream Publishing, Edinburgh, 2007, ISBN 978-1-84596-255-5)
