= CAR Cáceres =

Spanish rugby union club, based in Cáceres

- Full name: Club Amigos del Rugby Cáceres
- Founded: 1981; 45 years ago
- Location: Cáceres, Spain
- Ground: El Cuartillo
- President: Juan Rosado
- Coach: Martín Rojo
- League: 1⁰ Regional
Team kit

Official website
- www.carcaceres.es

The C.A.R. Cáceres, is a Spanish rugby union club sited in Cáceres. The club currently competes in the 1º Regional of the Extremadura League, the third division of Spanish rugby. The senior squad plays its matches at El Cuartillo.

== History ==
The Club Amigos del Rugby Cáceres (C.A.R. Cáceres) was founded in 1981 from a split of the now defunct Cacereño Atlético de rugby. The name of the club was chosen by Manolo Molina (Moli) and by its first President Mr. Fernando Sánchez Pascua, who played as a fly half for Ciencias de Sevilla during his student days, and even participated in some of the Spanish National Team squads. Mr. Fernando was president from 1981 until his death in 2012. His passion for the youth team and the game are two of the most important characteristics that characterise the club.

Rugby has always been linked to the university and student world, and the CAR was no different, and thanks to the fact that Mr. Fernando was a Mathematics teacher at the I.B. El Brocense, this institute was not only the place where the idea of founding a new rugby club was conceived, but it also became its social headquarters and for years its multi-sports court was the training place for Tuesdays and Thursdays. The Cáceres press called them "The cement Maoris". In gratitude, the youth team is known as CARIBE, joining the initials of CAR to those of I.B. (Brocense Institute).

Only four years later, in the 85/86 season, the C.A.R. Cáceres managed to be champion of Extremadura for the first time, becoming from this date the undisputed dominator of Extremadura rugby, obtaining, year after year, all the regional championships, except for the 88/89 season. Despite its continuous victories in the Extremadura competition, the C.A.R. Cáceres competed unsuccessfully on several occasions in the leagues for promotion to Primera Nacional (the second national rugby category after the División de Honor), until in 1994 and due to the remodelling of this in four groups, it achieved the longed-for promotion, losing the category the following year pushed by the relegation of the CR Liceo Francés from División de Honor de Rugby to Primera Nacional. During the 95/96 season it again won the right to represent Extremadura in the league for promotion to Primera Nacional, achieving it automatically when the number of participants in each of the 4 groups of said category was increased to ten, including C.A.R. Cáceres in Group D formed by teams from Madrid, Andalusia, the Canary Islands and Extremadura, this time yes, to consolidate itself definitively and until today in the same. From this moment on, the team experienced an improvement in its sporting level year after year, which led it to obtain a creditable seventh place in the 96/97 season, especially if one takes into account that this was the worst position it occupied throughout the season. In the 97/98 season, C.A.R. was classified at the end of the competition in fifth place, which allowed it to compete in the Copa Ibérica de Rugby (which pitted teams from Spain and Portugal against each other) against G.D. Direito de Lisboa, but was eliminated due to improper line-up in the Portuguese team. The Portuguese and Spanish federations granted C.A.R. Cáceres passage to the next round, but it finally refused to continue in the competition. The following year, the 98/99 season, they obtained the classification in fourth place tied on points with the team that achieved third place, but with a worse rugby average. The Spanish Rugby Federation (F.E.R.) awarded C.A.R. Cáceres the organisation of the final of the F.E.R. Cup, held in the Final 4 format and which was contested between the teams Puig Castelar, CRAT Xestur Coruña, Ferroplas Burgos and CAR Cáceres, which finally obtained third place. The constant evolution of the club led to it obtaining the title of Champion of Group D of the First National Division in the 99/00 season, which was an important success not only for Cáceres rugby, but for Extremadura sport in general. This success also allowed it to participate in the Promotion Phase to the División de Honor B de Rugby, eliminating the Biscayan team C.R. Mungia in the preliminary phase, thus qualifying for the final Promotion League. In this league, C.A.R. The team faced the teams of Independiente Cantabria, ADU Salamanca and Metre Les Abelles, and maintained its chances of promotion until the last day, finally finishing fourth, losing four matches and winning only two. The following season, 2000/2001, the C.A.R. qualified as second in the group of the First National Division, which gave it, again, the right to participate in the promotion phase to the Division of Honor “B”, being eliminated in the preliminary phase by Independiente Cantabria. In addition, the twentieth anniversary of the foundation of the C.A.R. Cáceres was commemorated with the dispute, as a culmination, of various matches against Olímpico de Pozuelo in the Youth, Senior and Veteran categories. The 2001/2002 season was disappointing in terms of sport as far as its first team is concerned, since the team did not qualify to play the promotion phase. The following season, 2002/2003, the coach was changed and they managed to play the preliminary phase to the Division of Honor “B” again, being eliminated again, this time by CRAT Xestur Coruña, despite the fact that it was a very close tie. With the firm objective of obtaining the longed-for, and already almost reached, promotion to the next category of national rugby, the 2003/2004 season began, in which the team occupied promotion places until this path was cut short by the sudden death of its coach, José Ángel Hermosilla and the subsequent collapse of the team. The following season, 2004/2005 was marked first by the change in the internal structure of the club and especially by the restructuring carried out by the F.E.R. in the First National, going from 4 to 8 groups and including the C.A.R. Cáceres in a group made up of teams from Castilla y León and Extremadura. They again qualify to play in the Promotion Phase, where they reach the final, after eliminating Industriales R.C. from Madrid and CR Majadahonda, to finally lose against Universidad de Málaga in a double-match final that ended up being decided in the last 10 minutes of the 2nd match. In the subsequent play-off, C.A.R. Cáceres succumbs again, this time against C.A.R. Inés Rosales from Sevilla from the División de Honor B de Rugby.

In addition, in that season, the important and constant commitment made by the club to the youth team bears its first fruits (at a national level, since at a regional level it had already been reaping for years), with the C.A.R. Cáceres Children's team obtaining 2nd place in the Open Spanish Children's Championship organized by the F.E.R. and held in Valladolid.

== Season to season ==
Season	Tier	Division	Pos.	Notes
1981–82	2	Primera Nacional	3rd	Relegated
1982–83	3	Segunda Nacional	2nd	
1983–84	3	Segunda Nacional	2nd	
1984–94	3	Segunda Nacional		
1994–95	2	Primera Nacional	7th	Relegated
1995–96	3	Segunda Nacional		Promoted
1996–97	2	Primera Nacional	7th	
1997–98	2	Primera Nacional	6th	
1998–99	2	Primera Nacional	4th	
1999–00	2	Primera Nacional	1st	
2000–01	2	Primera Nacional	2nd	
2001–02	2	Primera Nacional	6th	
2002–03	2	Primera Nacional	6th	
2003–04	2	Primera Nacional	3rd	
2004–05	2	Primera Nacional	3rd	
2005–06	2	Primera Nacional	1st	
2006–07	2	Primera Nacional	4th	
2007–08	2	Primera Nacional	6th	
2008–09	2	Primera Nacional	4th	
2009–10	2	Primera Nacional	4th	
2010–11	2	Primera Nacional	8th	
2011–12	2	Primera Nacional	8th	

Season	Tier	Division	Pos.	Notes
2012–13	2	Primera Nacional	5th	
2013–14	2	Primera Nacional	4th	Promoted
2014–15	2	División de Honor B	10th	
2015–16	2	División de Honor B	6th	
2016–17	2	División de Honor B	3rd	
2017–18	2	División de Honor B	5th	
2018–19	2	División de Honor B		
2019–20	2	División de Honor B	7th	
2020–21	2	División de Honor B	11th	Relegated
2021–22	3	1º Regional		Promoted
2023–24	2	División de Honor B	12th	Relegated
2024-25	3	1º Regional		

- 8 season in División de Honor B
