= Fernando Díez =

Spain international rugby union player

- Born: 23 September 1974 (age 52) Madrid, Spain
- Height: 5 ft 9 in (1.75 m)
- Weight: 176 lb (80 kg)
- Occupation: Coach

Rugby union career
- Position: Centre
Senior career
Years	Team	Apps	(Points)
1990s-2003	CR Liceo Francés		
International career
Years	Team	Apps	(Points)
1997-2003	Spain	26	(12)
Coaching career
- Years: Team
- 2012-2013: Spain 7s (Assistant coach)
- 2013-2016: CR Liceo Francés
- 2016–2022: Alcobendas Rugby (Assistant coach)
- 2024-: CR Liceo Francés

Fernando Díez Molina (born 23 September 1974, in Madrid) is a Spanish former rugby union player. He played as a centre. Currently, as from 2024, he coaches the CR Liceo Francés.

== Career ==
His first international cap was during a match against Czech Republic, at Santander, on 30 November 1997. He was part of the 1999 Rugby World Cup roster, where he was the only player of Liceo Francés. In the tournament he played just one match. His last international cap was during a match against Portugal, at Coimbra, on 23 March 2003.

== Coaching career ==
In 2012 he was appointed as coach of the Spain national rugby sevens team.

In 2013 he signed as coach of CR Liceo Francés until 2016. Afterwards he arrived at Alcobendas Rugby until 2022, when Spain was disqualified from the 2023 Rugby World Cup in France due to the improper alienation of a player. Fernando and "Tiki" were accused as accomplices since they knew that the player was not eligible to play for Spain. Fernando was suspended for five years from coaching any team.

In 2024 he confirms his return as coach of the CR Liceo Francés first team.
