= División de Honor Élite de Rugby =

Spanish rugby union competition

- Current season, competition or edition: 2025–26 División de Honor Élite de Rugby
- Sport: Rugby union
- Founded: 2025; 1 year ago
- Owner: Federación Española de Rugby
- No. of teams: 10
- Country: Spain
- Broadcaster: YouTube
- Promotion to: División de Honor
- Relegation to: División de Honor B
- Related competitions: Copa del Rey de Rugby
- Website: ferugby.es

División de Honor Élite is the second level of men's rugby union competition in Spain, created in 2025 as part of a major restructuring of the national league system. It is organized by the Federación Española de Rugby (RFER).

== History ==
Before 2025, the second tier of Spanish rugby was the División de Honor B de Rugby, organized in three geographical groups. The top clubs from each group advanced to an “Elite Group” stage and subsequent playoffs for promotion to the top division.

In 2025, the RFER approved a restructuring of the league pyramid to reduce the gap between the top and second levels, creating a single, unified national competition called the División de Honor Élite. The new division was introduced to strengthen competitiveness and ensure financial sustainability among clubs.

The inaugural 2025–26 season featured ten teams, including those from the 2024–25 “Elite Group” of División de Honor B (excluding the promoted club Liceo Francés) and the two teams relegated from División de Honor, CRC Pozuelo and Les Abelles.

With its creation, División de Honor B became the third tier of Spanish rugby.

== Competition Format ==
=== Regular season ===
The División de Honor Élite consists of 10 teams competing in a double round-robin format (home and away), for a total of 18 matchdays.

At the end of the regular season:

- The top four clubs qualify for the playoffs (semifinals and final).
- The semifinal pairings are 1st vs 4th and 2nd vs 3rd, played in a single match at the home ground of the higher-ranked team.
- The final is played as a single match hosted by the higher-ranked finalist.

=== Promotion and Relegation ===
- The champion of the division is promoted to División de Honor.
- The lowest-ranked team is relegated to División de Honor B.
- The reserve team Complutense Cisneros “Zeta” is automatically ineligible for promotion and subject to automatic relegation.
- From the 2026–27 season onward, “B” teams belonging to clubs in the top two divisions will not be allowed to compete in División de Honor Élite.

=== Points System ===
- Win: 4 points
- Draw: 2 points
- Bonus points:
  - 1 for scoring four or more tries in a match
  - 1 for losing by seven points or fewer

== Teams (2025–26 season) ==
Club	City	Head coach	Home ground	Capacity
CRC Pozuelo	Pozuelo de Alarcón	Miguel Ángel Puerta	Valle de las Cañas	500
A.D. Industriales Las Rozas	Las Rozas (Madrid)	Roberto Pintado	El Cantizal	800
Complutense Cisneros “Zeta” (B)	Madrid	Álvaro Rojo Pérez	Estadio Nacional Complutense	12,400
Fibra Valencia Les Abelles	Valencia	Maximiliano Machado	Polideportivo Quatre Carreres	500
RC Valencia	Valencia	Fernando Reche	Jorge Diego Pantera (Quatre Carreres)	1,296
Hernani CRE	Hernani	Jean Marc Higos	Landare Toki	1,600
Gernika RT	Guernica	Gorka Argul / Aitor Etxebarria	Urbieta Rugby Complex	1,500
Pasek Belenos RC	Avilés	Jesús Simón Beber	Estadio Yago Lamela (Santa Bárbara)	1,163
CR Sant Cugat	Sant Cugat del Vallès	Martín Ignacio García	ZEM La Guinardera	500
Recoletas Salud Fénix	Zaragoza	Federico Gallo	C.D.M. David Cañada	1,000

- Note:* RC L'Hospitalet initially qualified but declined participation; its place was taken by Fénix Club de Rugby Zaragoza.

== Integration with Copa del Rey ==
Starting from 2025 to 2026, clubs from División de Honor Élite (except Complutense Cisneros “Zeta” B) also compete in the Copa del Rey de Rugby, joining the 11 División de Honor teams to form a 20-team competition divided into four groups of five.

== 2025–26 Season ==
- The inaugural season began on 21 September 2025 and is scheduled to end on 26 May 2026.
- No champion has yet been crowned.
- The competition aims to stabilize Spain's second-tier rugby structure, reducing financial strain and improving sporting quality.

== See also ==
- División de Honor de Rugby
- División de Honor B de Rugby
- Copa del Rey de Rugby
- Federación Española de Rugby
