= José Ignacio Inchausti =

Spain international rugby union player

- Born: José Ignacio Inchausti Bravo; 1 January 1973 (age 53) Madrid, Spain
- Height: 6 ft 0 in (1.83 m)
- Weight: 166 lb (75 kg)
- Occupation: Clothes salesman

Rugby union career
- Position: Centre
Senior career
Years	Team	Apps	(Points)
????-2005	Alcobendas Rugby		
International career
Years	Team	Apps	(Points)
1999-2005	Spain	14	(5)
National sevens team
Years	Team		Comps
2001/2006	Spain		
Coaching career
- Years: Team
- 2008: Spain 7s
- 2008-2009: Gatos de Madrid
- 2014-2015: Alcobendas Rugby
- 2015-2016: Spain 7s
- 2016-2022: Alcobendas Rugby
- 2023-: CR Soto del Real

José Ignacio Inchausti Bravo (born 1 January 1973 in Madrid) is a Spanish former rugby union player and coach, nicknamed "Tiki", who played as a centre.

== Playing career ==
He debuted for the Spain national rugby union team in a test match against Japan in Tokyo, on 20 August 1999. He played in the 1999 Rugby World Cup and also in the 2001 Rugby World Cup Sevens in Mar del Plata. His last international match was against Slovenia at Ljubljana, on 27 March 2005. At the time of his World Cup cap, despite being the only squad member to play for a Spanish second division club, Moraleja Alcobendas, where he played for his entire career. Alfonso Feijoo had included him primarily because of his speed and potential despite having yet to score for Spain.

== Coaching career ==
From 2008, Inchausti was named as coach of the Spain national rugby sevens team. He was named again as coach of the Spain national rugby sevens team in 2015, replacing Alberto Socías. He also coached Spain during the 2016 Summer Olympics.

In 2022, Spain was disqualified from the 2023 Rugby World Cup in France due to the improper alienation of a player. "Tiki" and Fernando Díez were accused as accomplices since they knew that the player was not eligible to play for Spain. "Tiki" was suspended for five years from coaching any team. In 2023 he signed for CR Soto del Real on an interim basis.
