= Supercopa de España de Rugby =

Rugby tournament

Supercopa de Rugby
- Sport: Rugby union
- Inaugural season: 2003
- Region: Spain (FER)
- Holders: VRAC Quesos Entrepinares (2026)
- Most titles: VRAC Quesos Entrepinares (10 titles)
- Website: ferugby.com

Supercopa de España is the third most relevant Spanish rugby's tournament.

It's played to a single match between the League's champion and the Copa del Rey's winner. If a same team wins League & Cup, the Supercopa will be played between the League's champion and the Copa's runners-up.

Supercopa was established in 2003, being played the match usually at the end of the year.

== Winners by year ==
Year	Venue	Winner	Runners-up	Score
2003	Valladolid	(Castile and León) Cetransa El Salvador	(Community of Madrid) Complutense	23–19
2004	Valladolid	(Castile and León) Cetransa El Salvador	(Basque Country (autonomous community)) Bera Bera	36–13
2005	Valladolid/Sant Boi de Llobregat	(Castile and León) Cetransa El Salvador	(Catalonia) Santboiana	56–10	30–15
2006	Valladolid/Sant Boi de Llobregat	(Castile and León) Cetransa El Salvador	(Catalonia) Santboiana	36–5	20–35
2007	Valladolid/Sant Boi de Llobregat	(Castile and León) Cetransa El Salvador	(Catalonia) Santboiana	13–23	35–19
2008	Madrid/Valladolid	(Community of Madrid) CRC Madrid	(Castile and León) Cetransa El Salvador	22–15	14–20
2009	Madrid/Seville	(Community of Madrid) CRC Madrid	(Andalusia) Cajasol Ciencias	20–15	23–24
2010	Valladolid	(Castile and León) VRAC Quesos Entrepinares	(Castile and León) Cetransa El Salvador	13–8
2011	Madrid	(Valencian Community) La Vila	(Castile and León) Cetransa El Salvador	24–10
2012	Palencia	(Castile and León) VRAC Quesos Entrepinares	(Basque Country (autonomous community)) AMPO Ordizia	26–13
2013	Ordizia	(Castile and León) VRAC Quesos Entrepinares	(Basque Country (autonomous community)) AMPO Ordizia	14–3
2014	Valladolid	(Castile and León) VRAC Quesos Entrepinares	(Cantabria) Bathco Rugby	18–16
2015	Madrid	(Castile and León) VRAC Quesos Entrepinares	(Community of Madrid) Complutense Cisneros	24–21
2016	Valladolid	(Castile and León) VRAC Quesos Entrepinares	(Castile and León) SilverStorm El Salvador	17–14
2017	Valladolid	(Castile and León) VRAC Quesos Entrepinares	(Catalonia) Santboiana	46–23
2018	Valladolid	(Castile and León) SilverStorm El Salvador	(Castile and León) VRAC Quesos Entrepinares	24–22
2019	Valladolid	(Castile and León) VRAC Quesos Entrepinares	(Community of Madrid) Lexus Alcobendas	33–18
2020	Not Played (covid)			Cancelled
2021	Valladolid	(Community of Madrid) Lexus Alcobendas	(Castile and León) VRAC Quesos Entrepinares	18-13
2022	Sant Boi de Llobregat/Valladolid	(Catalonia) Santboiana	(Castile and León) SilverStorm El Salvador	20–20	21–26
2023	Valladolid	(Castile and León) Recoletas Burgos Caja Rural	(Castile and León) VRAC Quesos Entrepinares	30-27
2024	Palencia	(Castile and León) Recoletas Burgos Caja Rural	(Castile and León) VRAC Quesos Entrepinares	38-28
2025	Valladolid	(Castile and León) VRAC Quesos Entrepinares	(Castile and León) SilverStorm El Salvador	20–15
2026	Valladolid	(Castile and León) VRAC Quesos Entrepinares	(Community of Madrid) Silicius Alcobendas	32–25

== Titles by team ==
Team	Titles	Years won
(Castile and León) VRAC Quesos Entrepinares	10	2010, 2012, 2013, 2014, 2015, 2016, 2017, 2019, 2025, 2026
(Castile and León) El Salvador	6	2003, 2004, 2005, 2006, 2007, 2018
(Community of Madrid) CRC Madrid	2	2008, 2009
(Castile and León) Recoletas Burgos Caja Rural	2	2023, 2024
(Valencian Community) La Vila	1	2011
(Community of Madrid) Alcobendas Rugby	1	2021
(Catalonia) Santboiana	1	2022

== See also ==
- División de Honor de Rugby
- Copa del Rey de Rugby
- Rugby union in Spain
