= Gatos de Madrid =

Spanish rugby union club, based in Madrid

- Union: FER
- Nickname: Gatos (Cats)
- Founded: 2009; 17 years ago
- Disbanded: 2009; 17 years ago
- Ground(s): Campo de Rugby Las Terrazas, Alcobendas; Stade Ramón Urtubi, Madrid; Valle de las Cañas, Pozuelo de Alarcón
- President: Pedro Monzón
- Coach(es): Régis Sonnes; José Ignacio Inchausti
- 2009: 1º
Team kit

Gatos de Madrid were a rugby union franchise from Community of Madrid (Spain), which took part representing this community at Liga Superibérica.

The team was established in 2009, and was born incorporating, at the beginning, the four top-grade Madrid clubs: Club Alcobendas Rugby which took part at the División de Honor and the División de Honor B participants: CRC Madrid, Complutense Cisneros and C.R Liceo Francés, although its intention would have been to involve all the Madrid clubs in the project, in a future.

The team's home stadia, are the different stadiums of the constituent clubs of the franchise: Estadio de Las Terrazas in Alcobendas, Stade Ramón Urtubi and Campo Central de Ciudad Universitaria in Madrid; which are all located in the Community of Madrid.

Canterbury of New Zealand supplied the kits for the franchise, likewise for the other five participants.

== Name and emblem ==
The name and emblem of the franchise were elected after a popular contest, where the moniker Gatos (Cats) was chosen due to being an appellative of everyone born in Madrid, with four Madrilenian grandparents. The name dated back to the Reconquista where the inhabitants of the Land of Madrid distinguished themselves for their skill to climb walls, which was needed in those warring times against the peninsular Moors. Moreover, another account recounts that said moniker harkened back to the War of Independence in 1808, against the French, where following the 2 May uprising, the inhabitants of Madrid fought in the roofs like cats.

Eventually, the franchise's badge was a yellow cat eye with a black oval, representing a rugby ball.

== History ==
Gatos de Madrid debuted in official competition on 26 April 2009 against the Andalucian franchise Sevilla F.C Andalucía, at Campo de las Terrazas in Alcobendas with a 31–14 win. On 5 July 2009, Gatos won the first edition of Liga Superibérica after a 28 draw against Mariners and winning by try difference.

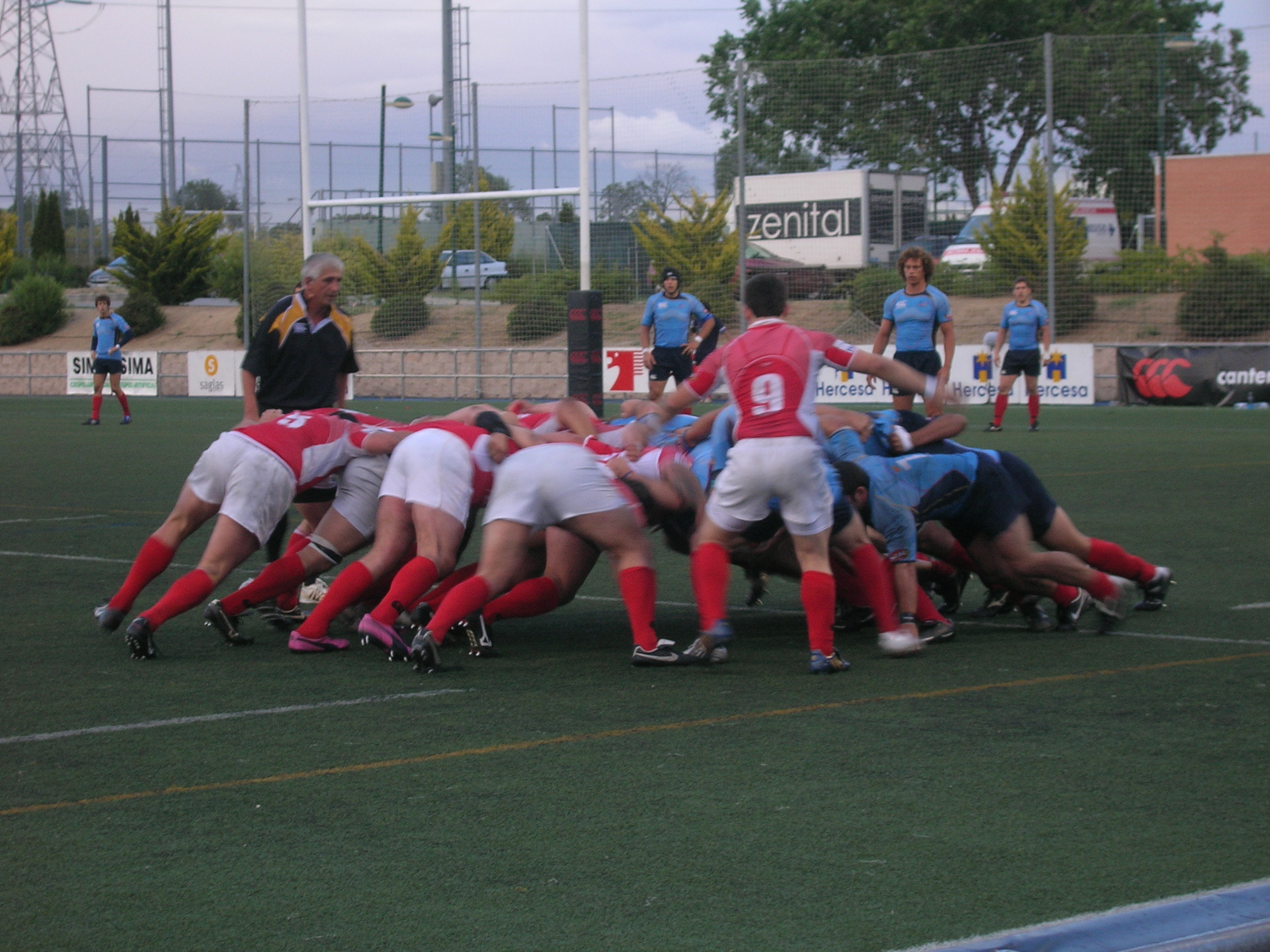
Scrum during the match Gatos vs. Almogavers (2009)

== Honours ==
- 1 Liga Superibérica: 2009

== See also ==
- Liga Superibérica
