= Real Madrid Rugby =

Spanish rugby union club, based in Madrid

Real Madrid
- Full name: Real Madrid Rugby
- Union: Spanish Rugby Federation
- Nickname: Merengues
- Founded: 1924 (disestablished 1948; 78 years ago)
Team kit

Real Madrid Rugby was the rugby union section of Spanish Real Madrid C.F. Established in 1924, the team achieved 4 unofficial regional titles and 1 Copa del Rey title in 1934, before being closed in 1948.

Although the section is currently extinct, there were some attempts to re-introduce the practise of rugby, but they were not finally carried out, including an unsuccessful agreement with rugby club CRC Madrid to have a team representing them at División de Honor, the first division of Spanish rugby.

== History ==
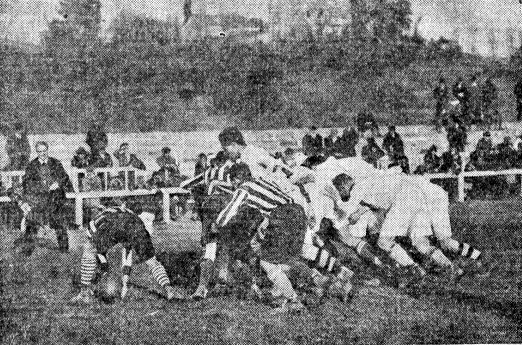
The first game, Real Madrid v. Atlético Madrid, 1925

The rugby section of Real Madrid was established by some young members of the club, with former footballer Eulogio Aranguren among them. On 10 January 1925, the squad played its first match v. Atlético Madrid in the Stadium Metropolitano, which was won by Real Madrid 27–0. During its first years of existence, Real Madrid Rugby played at different venues, such as Chamartín, El Estadio, El Campo de Los Suizos and Canillejas.

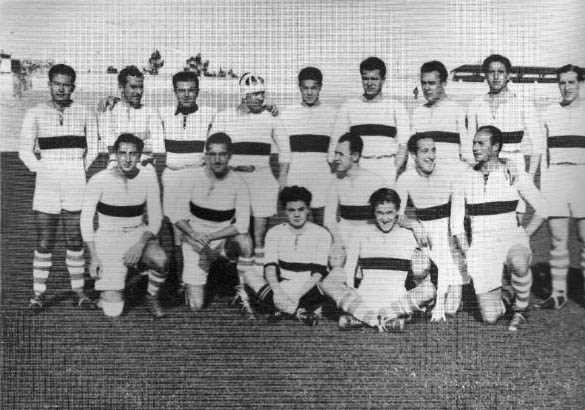
The team that won the Copa del Rey in 1934

On 25 January 1925, Real Madrid played Infantry Academy of Toledo at Estadio Chamartín, with a new win for Real Madrid by 23–9. After the match, the team was also awarded its first trophy.

At regional level, Real Madrid Rugby won four consecutive Campeonato Regional Centro, during the first years of the 1930s.

In 1934, Real Madrid won its first national title, the Copa del Rey de Rugby, after defeating Universitario de Valencia by 14–6. It would be its only title in that competition. Some of the most notable players of that final were fly-half Carlos García San Miguel and Ramón Resines.

After a hiatus due to the Civil War (1936–39), the rugby section of Real Madrid fell in popularity and was discontinued in 1948. In an attempt to bring the sport back to the club, in 2008 Real Madrid made arrangements with rugby club CRC Madrid (also known as CRC Pozuelo) to be represented in the Spanish premier league, División de Honor. When the agreement was about to be signed, president of Real Madrid Ramón Calderón, who had been the main architect of the return of rugby to the club, resigned from his role following allegations of vote-rigging for the confirmation for the financial budget. Real Madrid exploded into a crisis that suspended many projects and operations in the club, including the rugby section.

With the coming of Florentino Pérez to the club for a second term, past negotiations were not resumed. Therefore, rugby section has remained inactive since then.

After that, Atlético de Madrid made a deal with CRC Madrid to have a rugby team in the División de Honor. The CRC squad agreed to use the name, shield and colors of Atlético Madrid during the time the agreement was in force.

== Honours ==
- Copa del Rey (1): 1934
