= Diego Zarzosa =

Spain international rugby union player

- Born: Diego Zarzosa Peña; December 25, 1975 (age 50) Valladolid, Spain
- Height: 1.78 m (5 ft 10 in)
- Weight: 105 kg (231 lb)

Rugby union career
- Position: Hooker
Senior career
Years	Team	Apps	(Points)
1996-2006	CR El Salvador		
2006-2007	CRC Madrid		
2007	Harlequins		
2007-2009	CR El Salvador		
2009	Vacceos Cavaliers		
- Correct as of 2007-11-28
International career
Years	Team	Apps	(Points)
1998–2009	Spain	46	(15)
2007	Barbarians	1	(5)
- Correct as of 7 February 2022

Diego Zarzosa Peña (born 25 December 1975 in Valladolid) is a Spanish rugby union hooker who plays for CR El Salvador in the División de Honor.

Zarzosa represented Spain during the 1999 Rugby World Cup. In 2007, Zarzosa signed a six-months contract with English giants Harlequins after Samoan Tani Fuga was called to the World Cup squad and Chris Brooker suffered a shoulder injury. He was not able to debut in the Premiership. Later that year, he became the second Spanish-born rugby player to play for the Barbarians.

Zarzosa holds currently 45 caps for Spain, with 3 tries scored, 15 points in aggregate.
