= Club de Rugby San Roque =

Spanish rugby union club, based in Valencia

San Roque RC
- Full name: Club de Rugby San Roque
- Founded: 1971; 55 years ago
- Location: Valencia, Spain
- Ground: Campo del Río Turia
- President: Francisca Serrano
- Coach: Oscar Muñoz
- League: División de Honor B de Rugby

Official website
- www.sanroquerugby.com

The Club de Rugby San Roque is a rugby union club that was founded in 1971 in Valencia, when a teacher of the San Roque public school in the Benicalap district (Valencia) gathered a group of pupils and created an academy for this sport. Nowadays, the team is in the División de Honor B and has a squad in every other division, including a women's team.

Among its most recent successes, is its promotion to División de Honor B in 2021.

== Academy ==
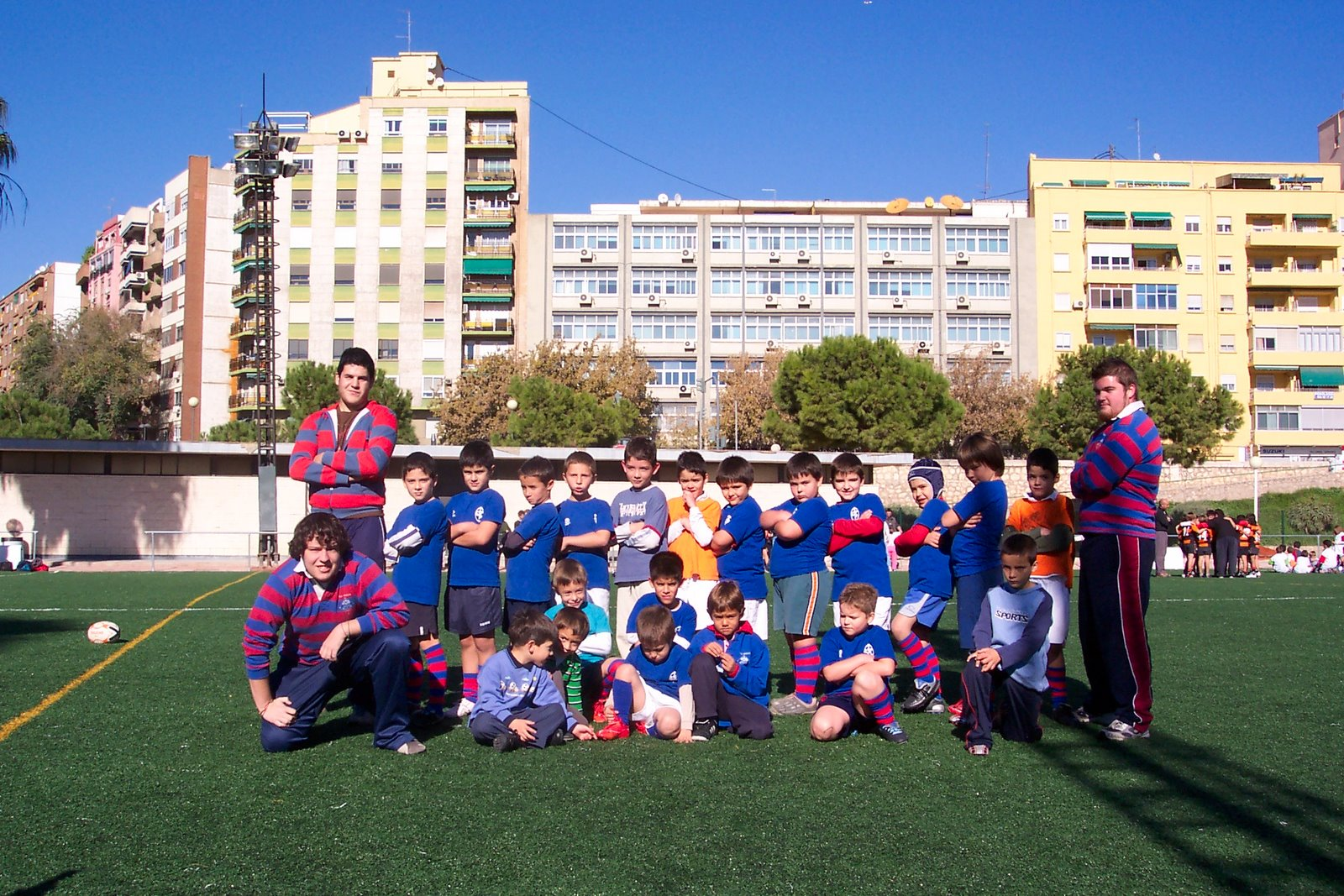
Under-8 players, November 2007

For more than a decade, the club has focused numerous efforts on its junior players. The organization has consolidated junior intake from the Santa María School, Valencia, the base which maintains all its inferior squads, from Under 6 to Under 18's. Combined with this, in the months leading up to the start of each school year, its instructors begin the recruiting process conducting rugby workshops and training initiation days in many city schools.

The time that is spent training young players comes to fruition with the many call-ups of San Roque players to the junior representative teams of the Valencian Rugby Federation and in the Spain national rugby union team, playing international tournaments.

- Rugby union in Spain
