= Fénix CR Zaragoza =

Spanish rugby union club, based in Zaragoza

Fénix Club de Rugby
- Founded: 1982; 44 years ago
- Location: Zaragoza, Spain
- Ground: CDM David Cañada
- Chairman: Juan Arias
- Coach: Federico Gallo
- League: División de Honor Élite
Team kit

Fénix Club de Rugby Zaragoza, known for sponsorship reasons as Recoletas Salud Fénix Rugby Zaragoza is an Aragonese rugby union club, based in the city of Zaragoza. It currently plays in the División de Honor Élite, the B team and the women's team play in the Aragonese league.

== History ==
In the 2018-19 season they played the promotion phase to the División de Honor for the first time in their history. Since then they have played the seasons 2019-20, 2020-21, 2021-22, 2022-23, 2023-24 and 2024-25 in División de Honor B de Rugby.
