= Catalunya Blaus Almogàvers =

Spanish rugby union club, based in Sant Boi de Llobregat

- Union: FER
- Nickname(s): Blaus (Blues); Almogàvers (Almogavars)
- Founded: 2009; 17 years ago
- Disbanded: 2009; 17 years ago
- Ground(s): Estadi Baldiri Aleu, Sant Boi de Llobregat
- President: Victoriano Marlet
- Coach: Pablo Tomás García
- 2009: 1º
Team kit

Catalunya Blaus Almogàvers were a rugby union franchise from Catalonia (Spain) and Oriental Pyrenees, which took part representing these regions at Liga Superibérica.

The team was established in 2009, and was born incorporating, at the beginning, several Catalan clubs: UE Santboiana, which took part at the División de Honor and the Primera División Nacional participants: RC Sitges, CR Sant Cugat, RC L'Hospitalet; as well as players of the Catalan First Division clubs Casteldefells RUC, CE INEF Lleida, Gòtics RC, Reus Deportiu and RC Cornellà, although its intention would also have some French Top14 team cede its players, in case a future season would be played.

The team's home stadium was UE Santboiana's Estadi Baldiri Aleu, in Sant Boi de Llobregat (Barcelona).

Canterbury of New Zealand supplied the kits for the franchise, likewise for the other five participants.

== Name and emblem ==
The name of the franchise, Almogàvers (Almogavars), is inspired on the history of Catalonia and of the Kingdom of Aragon. During the Middle Ages, the Crown of Aragon based their military power in the Mediterranean in these infantry troops. The adjective Blaus, which means "blues", was given due to their jersey's colour, such as other franchise from different competitions who used this moniker such as the Cardiff Blues from the URC or the Auckland Blues (Super Rugby).

The franchise's emblem is the word Almogàvers surrounded by some blue lines shaped after a rugby ball and the Catalan flag under the name.

== History ==
This franchise's first match was on 24 April 2009, in a match played at Miniestadio de Anoeta against Basque Korsarioak, they did not manage to win, but obtained the defensive bonus which was necessary at the end of the league's final phase. This regular phase was characterised by some small form ups and downs which before the last round they did not manage to qualify for the Final Four held in Madrid, thanks to their fourth place in the league. At the semifinals they faced La Vila Mariners which they did not manage to defeat, therefore, not making to the Final. They however played the third place final against the Korsarioak, who they could not defeat, remaining thus with the fourth place in this first edition of the league.

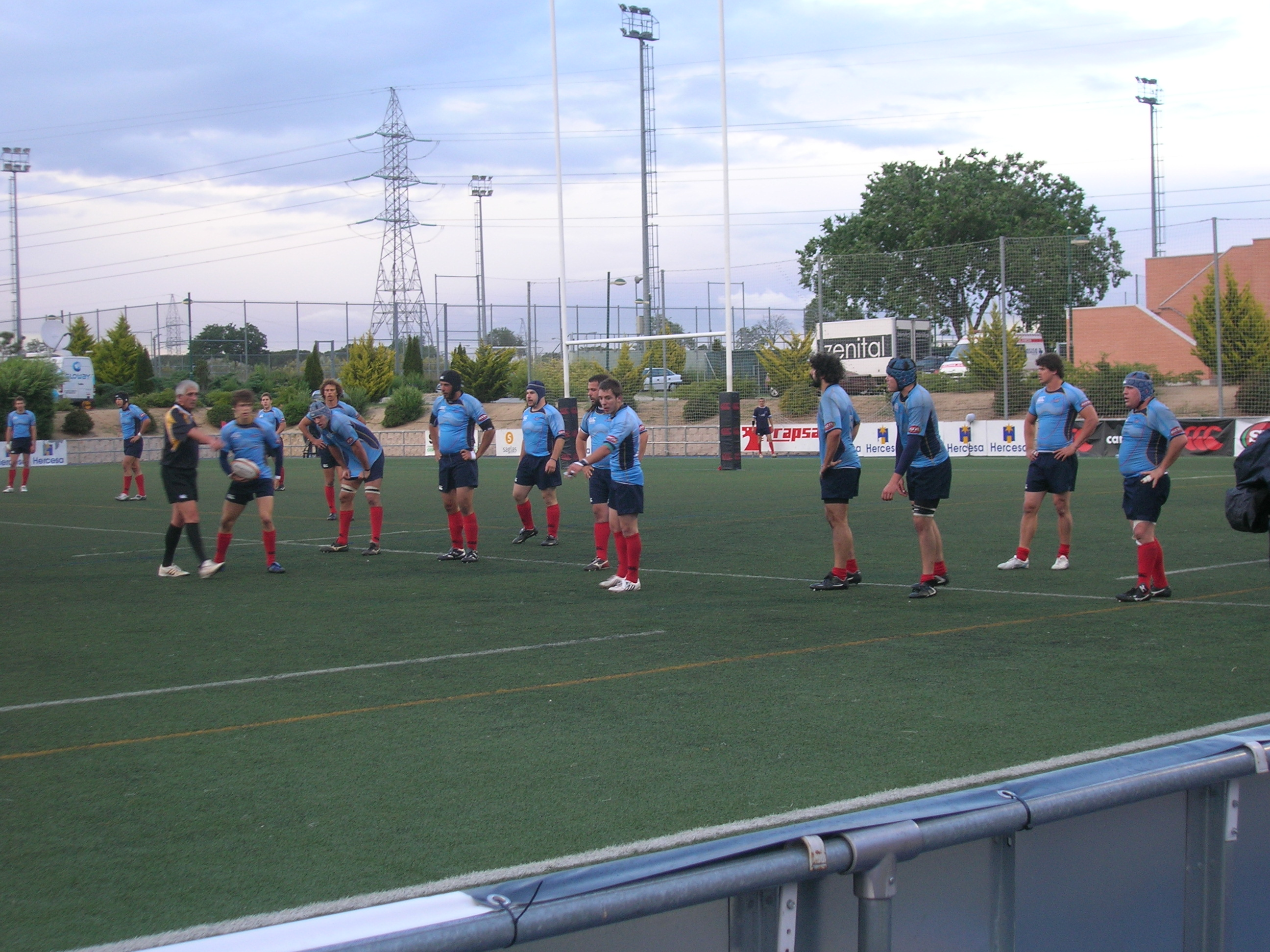
Catalunya Blaus Almogavers, 2009.

== See also ==
- Liga Superibérica
- Almogavar
