= Club Deportivo Arquitectura =

Spanish rugby union club, based in Madrid

Arquitectura
- Full name: Club Deportivo Arquitectura
- Union: Spanish Rugby Federation
- Nickname: La Escuela
- Founded: 1931; 95 years ago
- Region: Madrid, Spain
- Ground: Campo de rugby Las Leonas
- President: Javier Olaciregui
- Coach(es): Juan Pablo Tomás; Manuel Olivares
- League: División de Honor B
- 2023–24: 5th (Gr-C)
1st kit	2nd kit

Official website
- www.arquitectura-rugby.org

Club Deportivo Arquitectura is a Spanish rugby union club. Established in 1931, the team currently competes at División de Honor B, the second division of Spanish rugby. Arquitectura is also the most successful club with a total of 17 titles won to date.

== History ==
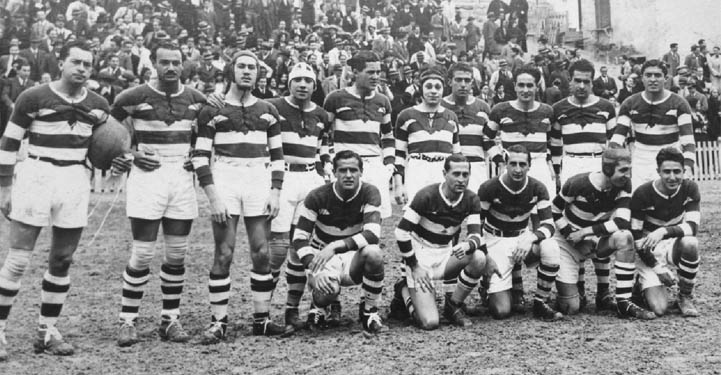
The 1932 team that won the first title for Arquitectura

In 1931, fifteen students of the Superior Technical School of Architecture of Madrid decided to form the first rugby union team of the School. Captained by Santiago Soler (who had experience having played for Atlético Madrid) the club won its first University championship that same season.

The squad would also win the title in 1935 and 1936. After a hiatus due to the Civil War, Arquitectura won a series of titles in the University championship, winning 13 titles (12 consecutive between 1948–1959; 1963). The club also crowned Spanish champion in 1957, 1958 and 1959 when the National University Games were established.

In the 1960s, new sections were added to the University program, such as basketball and volleyball. At a request of the Spanish Rugby Federation, the club was legally constituted under the name "Club Deportivo Arquitectura de Madrid" (CDA). Arquitectura won its first División de Honor championship (the top division of Spanish rugby) in 1974.

Arquitectura promoted to the first division, División de Honor, in 1971.

In 1974 the squad toured on France and the United Kingdom, playing a series of friendly games against Stade Français, London Welsh and London Scottish. Two years later, Arquitectura made another tour, achieving wins v. Camberley (7–0), London Scottish (10-3) and London Welsh (15-4). During successive years in the decade, Arquitectura also played French Aviron Bayonnais and Argentine CUBA, Newman and Buenos Aires CRC, among other teams.

The 1970s and 1980s were successful decades for the club, during those years Arquitectura won 6 Copa del Rey and 7 División de Honor championships, all of them between 1974 and 1988. In 1984 the club was also awarded the "Trofeo Villa de Madrid" as the most notable sports club of the city.

In the 1990s Arquitectura won two Copa Ibérica trophies and two División de Honor titles, becoming the most winning rugby team of Spain with 17 championships to date.

== Honours ==
- División de Honor (9): 1974, 1975, 1977, 1981, 1982, 1986, 1988, 1990, 1995
- Copa del Rey (6): 1976, 1980, 1981, 1984, 1986, 1988
- Copa Ibérica (2): 1991, 1996

== See also ==
- Rugby union in Spain
- Superior Technical School of Architecture of Madrid
