= Super Ibérica de Rugby =

Rugby championship

Superibérica de Rugby
- Current season, competition or edition: 2009 Superliga season
- Sport: Rugby union
- Founded: 2009
- No. of teams: 6
- Country: Spain
- Most recent champion: Gatos de Madrid

The Superibérica de Rugby was a national rugby union competition in Spain which was held in 2009 with six Spanish teams, with the hope of expanding to include Portuguese teams and a team from Gibraltar in the future.

Gatos de Madrid won the only season in 2009.

In January 2010 it was announced that the second Superliga season would take place in August, September and early October 2010. Eight teams (no mention of Portuguese or Gibraltarian teams) were expected to participate, however the competition was discontinued.

== Teams ==

Club	Country	City
Gatos de Madrid	Spain	Madrid
Vacceos Cavaliers	Spain	Valladolid
Basque Korsarioak	Spain	San Sebastián
Catalunya Blaus Almogàvers	Spain	Barcelona
Sevilla FC Andalucía	Spain	Seville
La Vila Mariners	Spain	Villajoyosa

== 2009 season ==
Season	Champion	Runner-up	Score	Stadium	Attendance
2009	Gatos de Madrid*	La Vila Mariners	28:28	Estadio Teresa Rivero, Madrid	5.300

*Winner for Tries (Gatos 2, Mariners 1)
