= Copa del Rey de Rugby =

- Founded: 1926
- Region: (Spain)
- Teams: 20
- Current champions: Alcobendas (2026)
- Most championships: FC Barcelona (16 titles)
- Broadcaster: Teledeporte

The Copa del Rey de Rugby (previously known as Campeonato de España de Rugby) is the national rugby cup of Spain. The competition was founded in 1926 and, currently is the second most important competition after the División de Honor de Rugby.

== All champions ==
Year	Champion	Score	Runner-up	Location	Stadium
Campeonato de España
1926	FC Barcelona	19–0	CDA Infantería de Toledo	San Baudillo de Llobregat	Camp del Riu
Not played
1930	FC Barcelona	39–3	Real Madrid	Barcelona	Campo de Les Corts
1931	Santboiana	12–6	Real Madrid	Chamartín de la Rosa	Estadio Chamartín
1932	FC Barcelona	20–3	Real Madrid	Madrid	
1933	Santboiana	24–6	Real Madrid	San Baudillo de Llobregat	Camp del Riu
1934	Real Madrid	14–6	FUE de Valencia	Chamartín de la Rosa	Estadio Chamartín
1935	Gimnástica Española	11–3	FUE de Valencia	Valencia	
Not played
Copa del Generalísimo
1941	SEU de Madrid	14–10	RCD Español de Barcelona	Vallecas	Campo de Vallecas
1942	FC Barcelona	17–8	SEU de Madrid	Madrid	
1943	Santboiana	16–0	Tavernes RC	Valencia	Estadio de Vallejo
1944	CF Real Madrid	9–0	SEU de Madrid	Barcelona	Campo de Les Corts
1945	FC Barcelona	3–0	SEU de Madrid	Madrid	Ciudad Universitaria
1946	FC Barcelona	23–13	SEU de Madrid	Barcelona	
1947	SEU de Madrid	16–3	FC Barcelona	Madrid	
1948	Santboiana	13–9	SEU de León	León	
1949	Atlético Madrid	8–3	Santboiana	Barcelona	Estadio de Montjuich
1950	FC Barcelona	10–3	Atlético Madrid	Madrid	Ciudad Universitaria
1951	FC Barcelona	14–0	Atlético Madrid	Zaragoza	Estadio de Torrero
1952	FC Barcelona	10–3	Atlético Madrid	Zaragoza	Campo del Arenas
1953	FC Barcelona	6–3	Atlético Madrid	Barcelona	Estadio de Montjuic
1954	SEU de Madrid	16–3	CN Barcelona	Madrid	
1955	FC Barcelona	10–0	Atlético Madrid	San Baudillo de Llobregat	
1956	FC Barcelona	6–3	Santboiana	Barcelona	La Foixarda
1957	CN Barcelona	8–0	FC Barcelona	Barcelona	La Foixarda
1958	Santboiana	11–9	FC Barcelona	Barcelona	La Foixarda
1959	Santboiana	20–14	Picadero Juventud	Barcelona	La Foixarda
1960	Santboiana	8–3	CN Barcelona	Barcelona	La Foixarda
1961	Santboiana	3–0	CN Barcelona	Barcelona	La Foixarda
1962	Santboiana	6–3	Atlético Madrid	Zaragoza	
1963	CN Barcelona	3–0	Santboiana	San Sebastián	
1964	Canoe NC	3–0	Santboiana	Pamplona	Estadio Ruiz de Alda
1965	FC Barcelona	3–0	C.R. Universidad Barcelona	Barcelona	La Foixarda
1966	Canoe NC	12–0	C.R. Universidad Barcelona	Barcelona	La Foixarda
1967	Cisneros	14–3	Santboiana	Madrid	
1968	Atlético San Sebastián	8–6	FC Barcelona	Madrid	
1969	Cisneros	11–8	FC Barcelona	Madrid	
1970	Real Canoe	17–13	Atlético San Sebastián	Madrid	
1971	Real Canoe	6–3	El Salvador	Madrid	
1972	Atlético San Sebastián	31–10	CN Barcelona	Madrid	
1973	Atlético San Sebastián	21–13	C.D. Arquitectura	Madrid	
1974	Real Canoe	13–9	Atlético San Sebastián	Madrid	
1975	Atlético San Sebastián	14–0	University of Valladolid	Madrid	
1976	C.D. Arquitectura	24–12	CAU Madrid	Madrid	
Copa del Rey
1977	CAU Madrid	26–6	Cisneros	Madrid	
1978	CAU Madrid	22–9	C.D. Arquitectura	Madrid	
1979	Cisneros	26–14	RC Valencia	Tarazona	Colegio Seminario Menor
1980	C.D. Arquitectura	19–0	CAU Madrid	Madrid	Campo de Rugby de Orcasitas
1981	C.D. Arquitectura	25–7	Real Canoe	Madrid	
1982	Cisneros	7–6	C.D. Arquitectura	Madrid	Campo de Rugby de Orcasitas
1983	FC Barcelona	27–12	CAU Madrid	Madrid	Campo de Rugby de Orcasitas
1984	C.D. Arquitectura	12–10	FC Barcelona	Burgos	
1985	FC Barcelona	36–7	University of Valladolid	Barcelona	La Foixarda
1986	C.D. Arquitectura	27–12	RC Valencia	Valencia	
1987	Olímpico de Pozuelo	26–10	Cisneros	Madrid	
1988	C.D. Arquitectura	21–12	Real Canoe	Badajoz	
1989	Santboiana	25–9	Liceo Francés	Pamplona	
1990	Getxo	28–7	Santboiana	Getafe	Polideportivo San Isidro
1991	Getxo	32–15	Gernika	El Puerto de Santa María	Estadio José del Cuvillo
1992	Getxo	20–9	BUC	Guecho	Velódromo de Fadura
1993	El Salvador	13–6	Getxo	Cuenca	Estadio La Fuensanta
1994	Ciencias	32–12	C.D. Arquitectura	Sevilla	
1995	Ciencias	37–25	Getxo	Oviedo	
1996	Ciencias	28–13	Valladolid RAC	Madrid	
1997	Getxo	37–19	Ciencias	Alcobendas	Polideportivo José Caballero
1998	Valladolid RAC	36–16	Real Canoe	Valladolid	Campos de Pepe Rojo
1999	El Salvador	27–19	Real Canoe	Valladolid	Campos de Pepe Rojo
2000	Santboiana	36–15	El Salvador	Valladolid	Campos de Pepe Rojo
2001	Real Canoe	37–20	Liceo Francés	Madrid	
2002	CRC Madrid	23–15	Valladolid RAC	Madrid	
2003	CRC Madrid	11–10	Alcobendas	Valladolid	Campos de Pepe Rojo
2004	Atlético Bera Bera	47–38	Santboiana	Zaragoza	
2005	El Salvador	29–8	Getxo	Zaragoza	
2006	El Salvador	34–9	Valladolid RAC	Valladolid	Campos de Pepe Rojo
2007	El Salvador	29–16	Santboiana	Gijón	Las Mestas
2008	CRC Madrid	36–31	El Salvador	Madrid	Estadio Nacional Complutense
2009	CRC Madrid	34–26	Ciencias	Sevilla	Estadio San Pablo
2010	Valladolid RAC	33–17	La Vila	Segovia	Estadio La Albuera
2011	El Salvador	13–0	Valladolid RAC	Villajoyosa	Campo de El Pantano
2012	Ordizia	30–27	El Salvador	Palencia	Estadio Nueva Balastera
2013	Ordizia	27–17	Valladolid RAC	Santander	Campos de Sport de El Sardinero
2014	Valladolid RAC	40–18	Independiente	Palencia	Estadio Nueva Balastera
2015	Valladolid RAC	33–15	Cisneros	Valladolid	Campos de Pepe Rojo
2016	El Salvador	13–9	Valladolid RAC	Valladolid	Estadio José Zorrilla
2017	Santboiana	16–6	El Salvador	Valladolid	Estadio José Zorrilla
2018	Valladolid RAC	20–16	El Salvador	Valencia	Estadio Ciudad de Valencia
2019	Alcobendas	24–23	FC Barcelona	Madrid	Estadio Nacional Complutense
2020	Alcobendas	24–18	El Salvador	Burgos	Campo de San Amaro
2021	Alcobendas	37–13	Aparejadores Rugby	Albacete	Estadio Carlos Belmonte
2022	El Salvador	27–26	Real Ciencias	Sevilla	Estadio de La Cartuja
2023	Valladolid RAC	29–25	Aparejadores Rugby	Sevilla	Estadio de La Cartuja
2024	Aparejadores Rugby	20-19	Valladolid RAC	Valencia	Estadi Ciutat de València
2025	Valladolid RAC	27–3	El Salvador	Valladolid	Estadio José Zorrilla
2026	Alcobendas	40–39	Cisneros	Madrid	Estadio Butarque

== Palmarés ==
=== Wins by team ===
Team	Titles	Year	Region
FC Barcelona	16	1926, 1930, 1932, 1942, 1944, 1945, 1946, 1950, 1951, 1952, 1953, 1955, 1956, 1965, 1983, 1985	(Catalonia)
Santboiana	12	1931, 1933, 1943, 1948, 1958, 1959, 1960, 1961, 1962, 1989, 2000, 2017	(Catalonia)
Canoe/CRC Pozuelo	10	1964, 1966, 1970, 1971, 1974, 2001, 2002, 2003, 2008, 2009	(Community of Madrid)
El Salvador	8	1993, 1999, 2005, 2006, 2007, 2011, 2016, 2022	(Castile and León)
VRAC	7	1998, 2010, 2014, 2015, 2018, 2023, 2025	(Castile and León)
Arquitectura	6	1976, 1980, 1981, 1984, 1986, 1988	(Community of Madrid)
Atl. San Sebastián	4	1968, 1972, 1973, 1975	(Basque Country (autonomous community))
Cisneros	4	1967, 1969, 1979, 1982	(Community of Madrid)
Getxo R.T.	4	1990, 1991, 1992, 1997	(Basque Country (autonomous community))
Alcobendas	4	2019, 2020, 2021, 2026	(Community of Madrid)
SEU Madrid	3	1941, 1947, 1954	(Community of Madrid)
Ciencias Sevilla	3	1994, 1995, 1996	(Andalusia)
Natació Barcelona	2	1957, 1963	(Catalonia)
CAU Madrid	2	1977, 1978	(Community of Madrid)
AMPO Ordizia	2	2012, 2013	(Basque Country (autonomous community))
Real Madrid	1	1934	(Community of Madrid)
RS Gimnástica Española	1	1935	(Community of Madrid)
Atlético Madrid	1	1949	(Community of Madrid)
Olímpico	1	1987	(Community of Madrid)
Atlético Bera Bera	1	2004	(Basque Country (autonomous community))
Aparejadores Rugby	1	2024	(Castile and León)

== See also ==
- División de Honor de Rugby
- Supercopa de España de Rugby
- Rugby union in Spain
