= CRC Pozuelo =

Spanish rugby union club, based in Pozuelo

- Full name: Club de Rugby CRC Pozuelo
- Founded: 1963; 63 years ago
- Ground(s): Campo de Rugby Valle de las Cañas; Pozuelo de Alarcón (Madrid) España
- Chairman: Javier Balmaseda
- Coach: Miguel Ángel Puerta
- League: División de Honor
- 2024–25: División de Honor, 11th ↓
1st kit	2nd kit

Official website
- crcpozuelorugby.com

The Club de Rugby Pozuelo, also known as CRC Pozuelo, is a Spanish rugby union club sited in Pozuelo de Alarcón. The club currently competes in the División de Honor Élite, the second division of Spanish rugby. The senior squad plays its matches at Campo de Rugby Valle de las Cañas.

== History ==
The club was born as the rugby department of Real Canoe Natación Club (one of the oldest swimming clubs of Spain) in 1963. One year after being established, the club won its first title, the Copa del Rey (then named "Copa del Generalísimo") after defeating Unión Deportiva Samboyana by 3-0 at Ruiz de Alda stadium.

After that achievement, Real Canoe played its first international competition, the Copa Ibérica de Rugby in 1965, becoming successor of defunct Real Madrid Rugby and Atlético Madrid. In 1967 Canoe won its second Copa Ibérica title.

In 2008, the Real Madrid C.F. made arrangements with Canoe to be represented in the División de Honor, reviving the rugby section of the club. When the agreement was about to be signed, president of Real Madrid Ramón Calderón, who had been the main architect of the return of rugby to the club, resigned from his role following allegations of vote-rigging for the confirmation for the financial budget. Real Madrid exploded into a crisis that suspended many projects and operations in the club, including the rugby section.

Canoe made a great campaign in the 2008–09 season, where the club won the División de Honor, Copa and Supercopa of Spain. Some of its most notable players were César Sempere, Javier Canosa, Juan Cano, Javier Salazar and Pablo Feijoo. In July 2010, CRC Pozuelo Madrid announced that the club would sell his place at División de Honor to meet the debts incurred by the business. As a result, the team played in the second division, "División de Honor B" in the 2010–11 and 2011–12 seasons. In March 2012 CRC Pozuelo promoted to the first division after winning the playoffs.

In 2012, Atlético de Madrid made a deal with CRC to have a rugby team in the División de Honor. The CRC squad agreed to use the name, shield and colors of Atlético Madrid during the time the agreement was in force.

In 2014 the team returned to competition under its name "CRC Pozuelo", after finishing the agreement with Atlético Madrid.

=== Club names ===
- Real Canoe Natación Club (1963–2000)
- UCM Canoe (2000–2001) – (Merger of Real Canoe & CD Universidad Complutense)
- Club de Rugby UCM (2001–2005) – (Merger of UCM Canoe & CR Liceo Francés, in 2003 Liceo Francés left the club)
- Club de Rugby CRC Madrid (2005–2007) – (CD Universidad Complutense left the club)
- Club de Rugby CRC Pozuelo (2007-Present)

=== Team names ===
- Real Canoe Natación Club (1963–1999)
- Complutense Canoe (1999–2000)
- UCM Canoe (2000–2001)
- UCM Madrid 2012 (2001–2002)
- UCM2M12 (2002–2004)
- Pozuelo UCM 2M12 (2004–2005)
- Madrid Noroeste (2005–2007)
- Bwin Pozuelo (2007–2008)
- CRC Madrid (2008–2011)
- Polideportivos & Fitness CRC (2011–2012)
- Rugby Atlético Madrid (2012–2014)
- CRC Pozuelo (2014–Present)
- CRC Pozuelo - Universidad Francisco de Vitoria (2018-2020)
- Pozuelo Rugby Unión (2020-2025)

== Season by season ==
Season	Tier	Division	Pos.	Notes
1969–70	1	División de Honor	3rd	Cup champion
1970–71	1	División de Honor	1st	League/Cup champion
1971–72	1	División de Honor	1st	League/Cup champion
1972–73	1	División de Honor	1st	League champion
1973–74	1	División de Honor	3rd	Cup champion
1974–75	1	División de Honor	4th	
1975–76	1	División de Honor	4th	
1976–77	1	División de Honor	7th	
1977–78	1	División de Honor	8th	
1978–79	1	División de Honor	5th	
1979–80	1	División de Honor	5th	
1980–81	1	División de Honor	2nd	
1981–82	1	División de Honor	2nd	↓
1982–83	2	Primera Nacional	2nd	
1983–84	2	Primera Nacional	4th	
1984–85	2	Primera Nacional	5th	
1985–86	2	Primera Nacional	3rd	
1986–87	2	Primera Nacional	1st	↑
1987–88	1	División de Honor	8th	
1988–89	1	División de Honor	4th	
1989–90	1	División de Honor	9th	
1990–91	1	División de Honor	10th	
1991–92	1	División de Honor	12th	↓
1992–93	2	Primera Nacional	7th	
1993–94	2	Primera Nacional	7th	
1994–95	2	Primera Nacional	1st	↑
1995–96	1	División de Honor	5th	
1996–97	1	División de Honor	6th	
1997–98	1	División de Honor	3rd	
1998–99	1	División de Honor	4th	
1999–00	1	División de Honor	1st	League champion
2000–01	1	División de Honor	6th	Cup champion

Season	Tier	Division	Pos.	Notes
2001–02	1	División de Honor	3rd	Cup champion
2002–03	1	División de Honor	4th	Cup champion
2003–04	1	División de Honor	2nd	
2004–05	1	División de Honor	5th	↓
2005–06	2	División de Honor B	1st	↑
2006–07	1	División de Honor	2nd	
2007–08	1	División de Honor	3rd	Cup champion
2008–09	1	División de Honor	1st	League/Cup champion
2009–10	1	División de Honor	5th	↓
2010–11	2	División de Honor B	1st	
2011–12	2	División de Honor B	1st	↑
2012–13	1	División de Honor	6th / SF	
2013–14	1	División de Honor	5th / QF	
2014–15	1	División de Honor	8th	
2015–16	1	División de Honor	12th	↓
2016–17	2	División de Honor B	1st	
2017–18	2	División de Honor B	2nd	
2018–19	2	División de Honor B	2nd	
2019–20	2	División de Honor B	2nd	
2020–21	2	División de Honor B	2nd	
2021–22	2	División de Honor B	1st	↑
2022-23	1	División de Honor	9th	
2023-24	1	División de Honor	10th	
2024-25	1	División de Honor	11th	↓
2025–26	2	División de Honor Élite	-	

- 39 seasons in División de Honor
- Starting with the 2025-26 season, the División de Honor Élite became the second division of Spanish rugby.

== Titles ==
- División de Honor (5): 1971, 1972, 1973, 2000, 2009
- Copa del Rey (10): 1964, 1966, 1970, 1971, 1974, 2001, 2002, 2003, 2008, 2009
- Supercopa de España (2): 2008, 2009
- Copa Ibérica (3): 1965, 1967, 2001

== See also ==
- Real Madrid Rugby
- Atlético Madrid Rugby
- Real Canoe NC
- Rugby union in Spain
